= Kawaji-Yumoto Station =

Railway station in Nikkō, Tochigi Prefecture, Japan

Kawaji-Yumoto Station 川治湯元駅
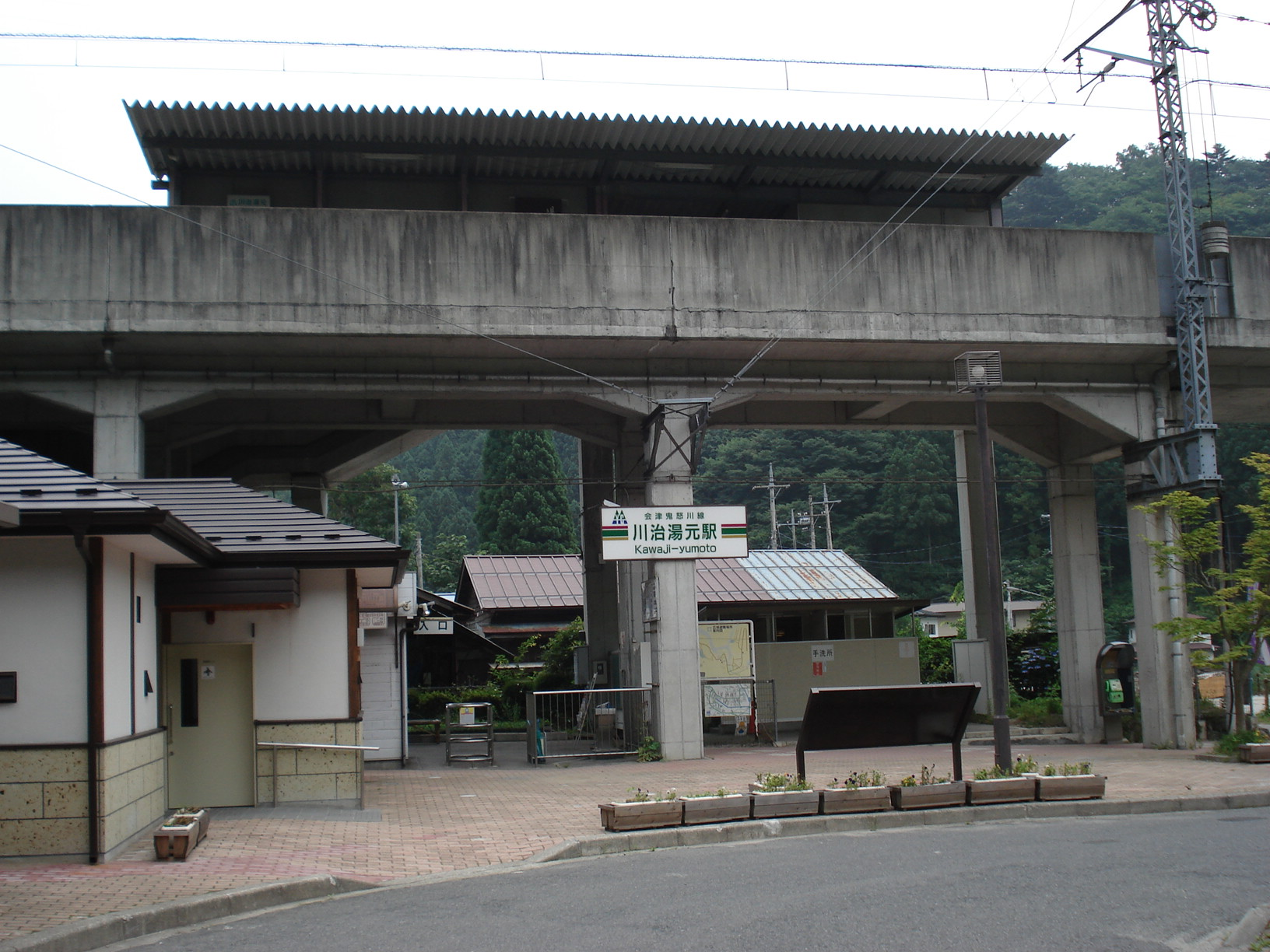
- Kawaji-Yumoto Station in July 2008

General information
- Location: 129-1 Kawaji, Nikkō^shi, Tochigi-ken 321-2611; Japan
- Coordinates: 36.8952°N 139.7030°E
- Operator: Yagan Railway
- Line: ■ Aizu Kinugawa Line
- Distance: 6.0 km from Shin-Fujiwara
- Platforms: 1 side platform

Other information
- Website: Official website

History
- Opened: October 9, 1986

Passengers
- FY2016: 73 daily

Services
Preceding station	Yagan Railway	Following station
Kawaji-Onsen towards Shin-Fujiwara	Aizu	Yunishigawa-Onsen towards Aizukōgen-Ozeguchi
Kawaji-Onsen towards Shin-Fujiwara	Aizu Kinugawa Line	Yunishigawa-Onsen towards Aizukōgen-Ozeguchi
Location
- Location within Tochigi Prefecture Location within Japan

Kawaji-Yumoto Station (川治湯元駅, Kawaji-Yumoto-eki) is a railway station in the city of Nikkō, Tochigi, Japan, operated by the Yagan Railway.

== Lines ==
Kawaji-Yumoto Station is served by the Yagan Railway Aizu Kinugawa Line and is located 6.0 rail kilometers from the end of the line at Shin-Fujiwara Station.

== Station layout ==
The station has a single elevated side platform serving traffic in both directions, with the station building located underneath.

== History ==
Kawaji-Yumoto Station opened on October 9, 1986.

== Surrounding area ==
- National Route 121
- Kawaji Onsen
- Kawaji Post Office
- Kawaji Dam
