= Yunishigawa-Onsen Station =

Railway station in Nikkō, Tochigi Prefecture, Japan

Yunishigawa-Onsen Station 湯西川温泉駅
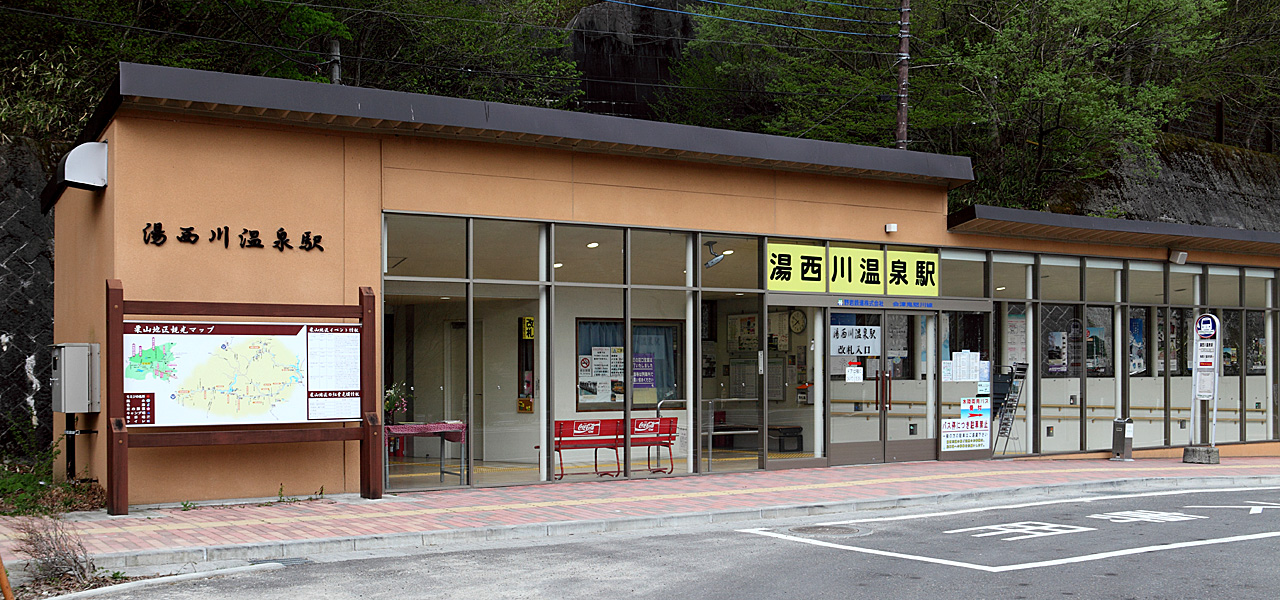
- Yunishigawa-Onsen Station in May 2010

General information
- Location: 481-1 Nishikawa, Nikkō-shi, Tochigi-ken 321-2603; Japan
- Coordinates: 36°55′46″N 139°41′18″E
- Operator: Yagan Railway
- Distance: 10.3 km from Shin-Fujiwara
- Platforms: 1 side platform

Other information
- Website: Official website (in Japanese)

History
- Opened: October 9, 1986

Passengers
- FY2016: 94 daily

Services
Preceding station	Yagan Railway	Following station
Kawaji-Yumoto towards Shin-Fujiwara	Aizu	Nakamiyori-Onsen towards Aizukōgen-Ozeguchi
Kawaji-Yumoto towards Shin-Fujiwara	Aizu Kinugawa Line	Nakamiyori-Onsen towards Aizukōgen-Ozeguchi
Location
- Location within Tochigi Prefecture Location within Japan

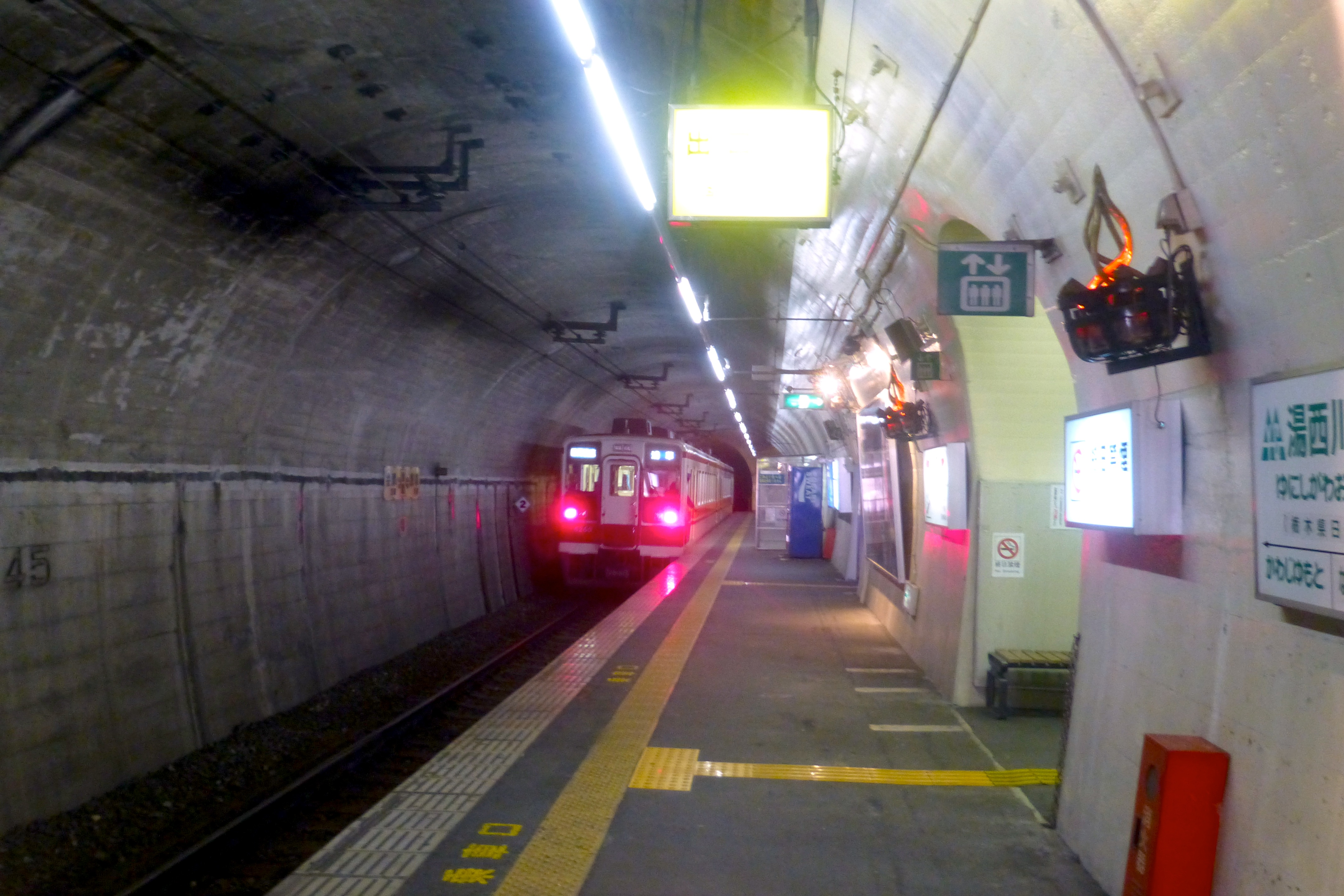
Station platform.

Yunishigawa-Onsen Station (湯西川温泉駅, Yunishigawa-Onsen-eki) is a railway station in the city of Nikkō, Tochigi, Japan, operated by the Yagan Railway.

== Lines ==
Yunishikawa-Onsen Station is served by the Yagan Railway Aizu Kinugawa Line and is located 10.3 rail kilometers from the end of the line at Shin-Fujiwara Station.

== Station layout ==
The station consists of a single side platform serving traffic in both directions, which is located in a tunnel

== History ==
Yunishikawa-Onsen Station opened on October 9, 1986.

== Surrounding area ==
- National Route 121
- Yunishikawa Onsen
