= Nakamiyori-Onsen Station =

Railway station in Nikkō, Tochigi Prefecture, Japan

Nakamiyori-Onsen Station 中三依温泉駅
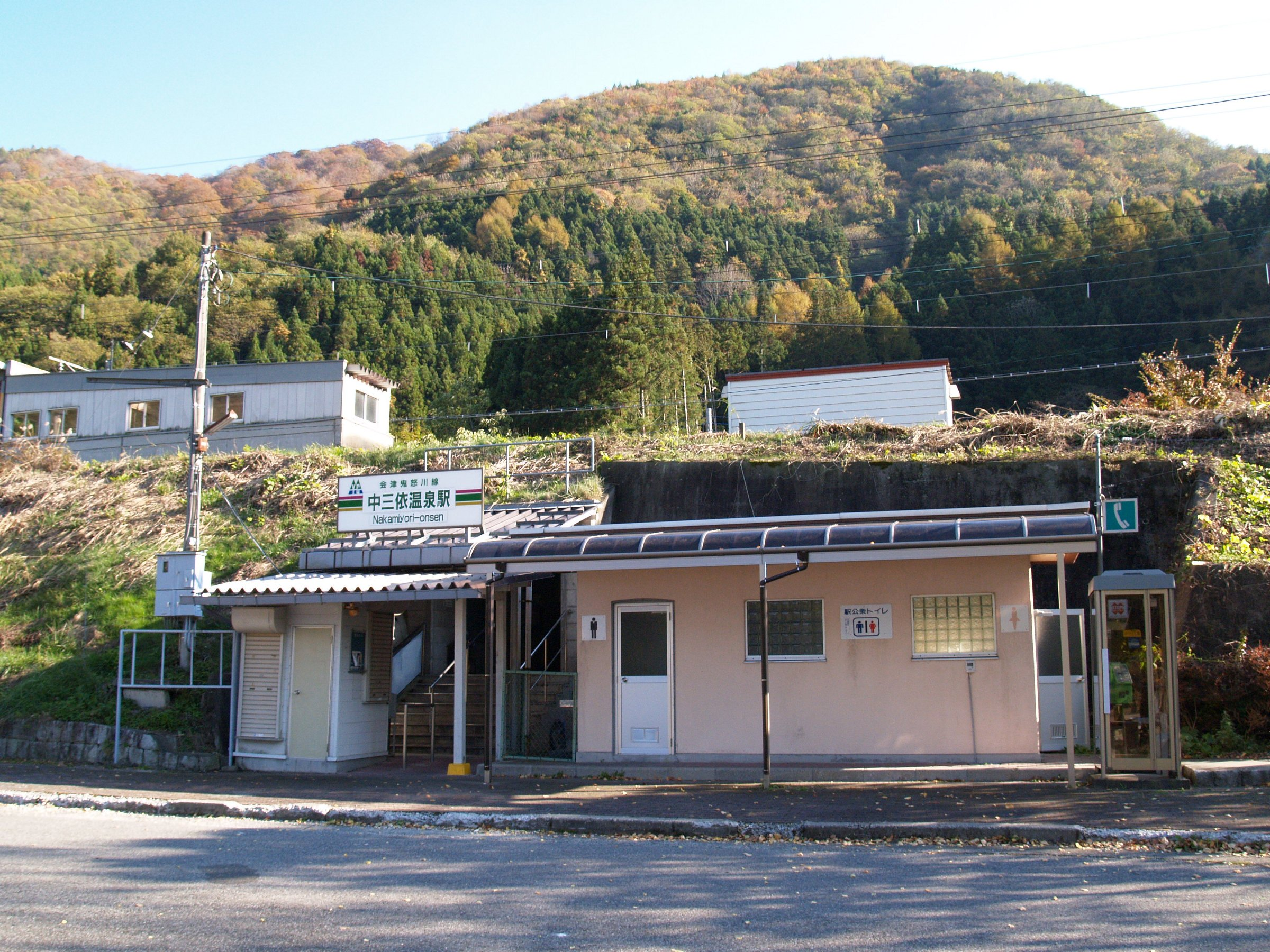
- Nakamiyori-Onsen Station in October 2011

General information
- Location: 378-2 Nakamiyori, Nikkō-shi, Tochigi-ken 321-2803; Japan
- Coordinates: 36.985306°N 139.698972°E
- Operator: Yagan Railway
- Line: ■ Aizu Kinugawa Line
- Distance: 16.8 km from Shin-Fujiwara
- Platforms: 1 island platform

Other information
- Website: Official website

History
- Opened: October 9, 1986
- Former names: Nakamiyori (to 2006)

Passengers
- FY2016: 12 daily

Services
Preceding station	Yagan Railway	Following station
Yunishigawa-Onsen towards Shin-Fujiwara	Aizu	Kamimiyori-Shiobara-Onsenguchi towards Aizukōgen-Ozeguchi
Yunishigawa-Onsen towards Shin-Fujiwara	Aizu Kinugawa Line	Kamimiyori-Shiobara-Onsenguchi towards Aizukōgen-Ozeguchi
Location
- Location within Tochigi Prefecture Location within Japan

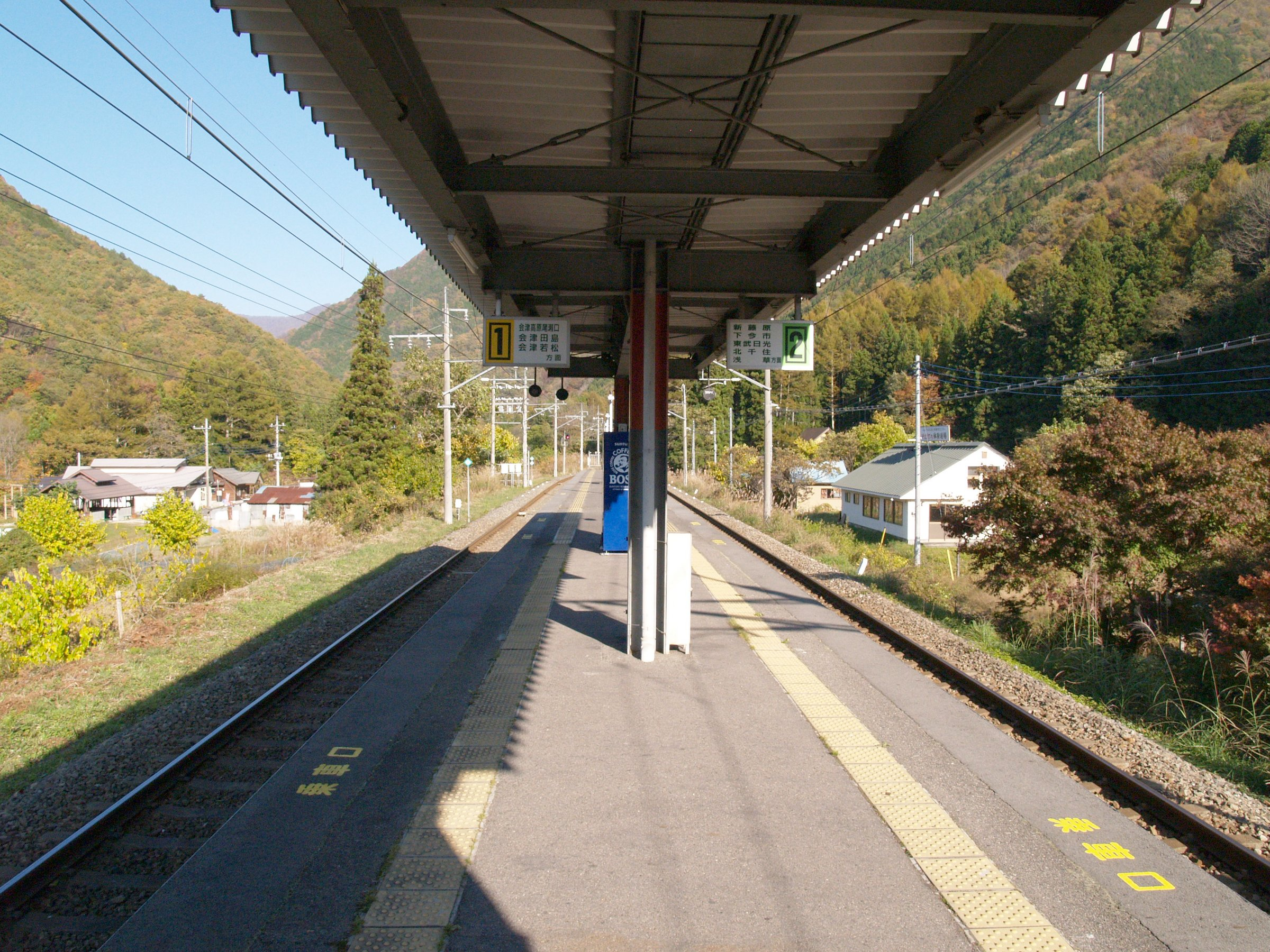
Station platform.

Nakamiyori-Onsen Station (中三依温泉駅, Nakamiyori-Onsen-eki) is a railway station in the city of Nikkō, Tochigi, Japan, operated by the Yagan Railway.

== Lines ==
Nakamiyori-Onsen Station is served by the Yagan Railway Aizu Kinugawa Line and is located 16.8 rail kilometers from the opposing terminal at Shin-Fujiwara Station.

== Station layout ==
The station has a single island platform on an embankment, connected to the station building by an underground passage. The station is unattended.

== History ==
Nakamiyori-Onsen Station opened on October 9, 1986. At the time of opening, it was known as Nakamiyori Station (中三依駅). It was renamed to its present name in March 2006.

== Surrounding area ==
- National Route 121
- Miyori Post Office
- Nakamiyori Onsen Center
