= Kōrō Sasaki =

Japanese politician (1895–1978)

- 佐々木 耕郎

Mayor of Nikkō
- In office 28 August 1953 – 27 August 1969
- Preceded by: Toshijirō Itō
- Succeeded by: Nijūrō Hoshino

Member of the Tochigi Prefectural Assembly
- In office April 1951 – July 1953

Personal details
- Born: 21 August 1895 Morioka, Iwate, Japan
- Died: 1 October 1978 (aged 83) Mibu, Tochigi, Japan
- Education: Takachiho University

Kōrō Sasaki (佐々木 耕郎 Sasaki Kōrō, 21 August 1895 – 1 October 1978) was a Japanese politician. He served as the mayor of Nikkō in Tochigi Prefecture from 1953 to 1969, overseeing its transition to an independent municipality in 1954. During his time as mayor, he promoted the city's development as an international cultural tourist destination. He was active in social education and served as president of the Tochigi Scout Council and the Tochigi Prefecture Skating Association.

== Life and career ==
Kōrō Sasaki was born on 21 August 1895 in the city of Morioka in Iwate Prefecture. In 1917 he graduated from Takachiho University and found employment with Furukawa Electric. He was held liable for having a number of employees dismissed at the end of World War II. He retired from the company in 1945 and thereafter took up residence in Nikkō in Tochigi Prefecture. That November he served as president of Betsukura Seisakusho Co. Ltd. and hired employees who had been laid off from Furukawa.

Sasaki served on the Tochigi Prefectural Assembly from April 1951 to July 1953. Following the death of the mayor of Nikkō, Toshijirō Itō, (Note: 伊藤敏次郎 Itō Toshijirō) Sasaki ran for and won the position in July 1953. He remained mayor until 27 August 1969. He oversaw the transition of Nikkō into an independent municipality, a process begun under Itō, which involved a merger with Okorogawa. He then became the first mayor of the new municipality on 11 February 1954. During his time as mayor Sasaki focused on such health and social welfare issues as human waste treatment facilities, garbage incinerators, and the development of Nikkō as an international cultural tourist destination. He was made an honorary citizen of Nikkō on 11 February 1971.

Sasaki was dedicated to social education and served as president of the Tochigi Boy Scout Association (Note: ボーイスカウト栃木連盟 Bōi Sukauto Tochigi Renmei) and the Tochigi Prefecture Skating Association. (Note: 栃木県スケート連盟 Toshigi-ken Skēto Renmei) Sasaki died at 05:15 on 1 October 1978 at age 83 at Dokkyo Medical University Hospital. He was appointed to the Senior Sixth Rank of the Imperial Court.
