= Kawaji-Onsen Station =

Railway station in Nikkō, Tochigi Prefecture, Japan

Kawaji-Onsen Station 川治温泉駅
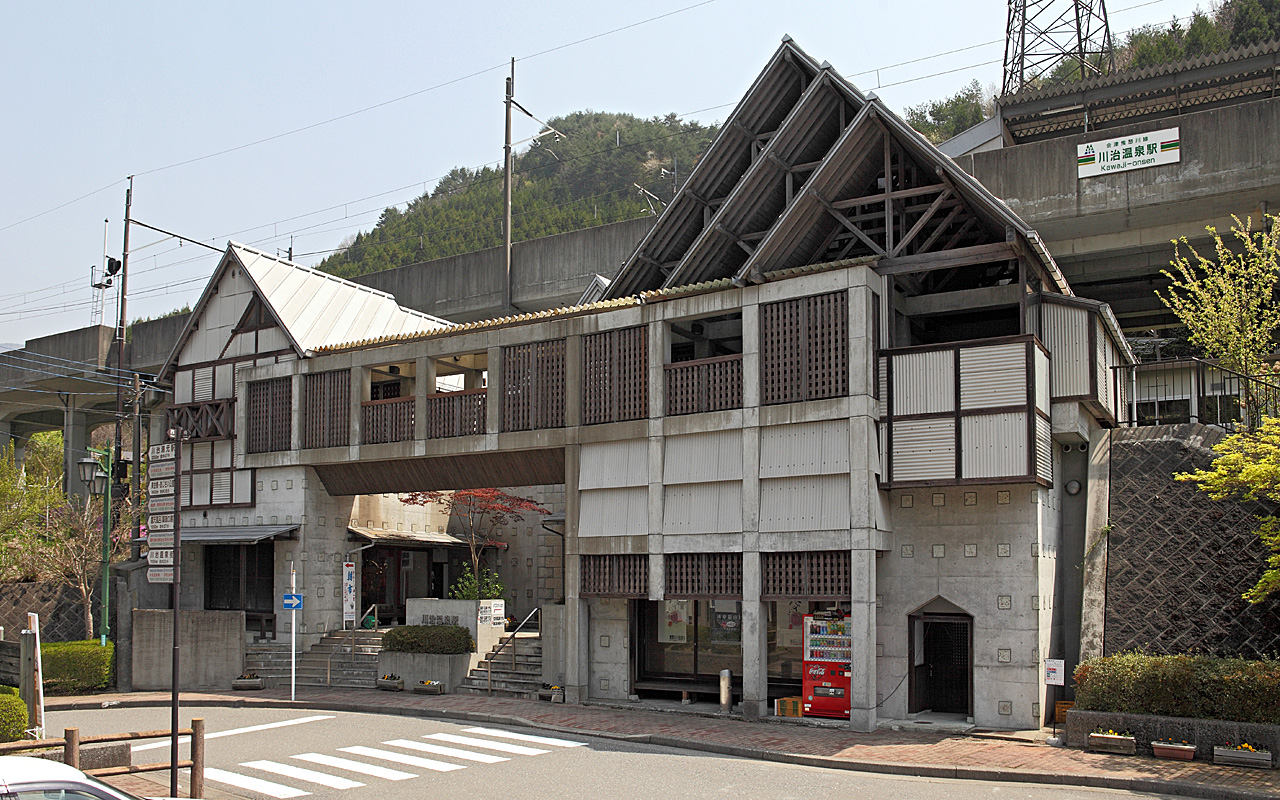
- Kawaji-Onsen Station in May 2010

General information
- Location: Fujiwara 1077-4, Nikkō-shi, Tochigi-ken 321-2521; Japan
- Coordinates: 36°53′03″N 139°42′14″E
- Operator: Yagan Railway
- Line: ■ Aizu Kinugawa Line
- Distance: 4.8 km from Shin-Fujiwara
- Platforms: 1 island platform

Other information
- Website: Official website

History
- Opened: October 9, 1986

Passengers
- FY2016: 29 daily

Services
Preceding station	Yagan Railway	Following station
Ryūōkyō towards Shin-Fujiwara	Aizu	Kawaji-Yumoto towards Aizukōgen-Ozeguchi
Ryūōkyō towards Shin-Fujiwara	Aizu Kinugawa Line	Kawaji-Yumoto towards Aizukōgen-Ozeguchi
Location
- Location within Tochigi Prefecture Location within Japan

Kawaji-Onsen Station (川治温泉駅, Kawaji-Onsen-eki) is a railway station in the city of Nikkō, Tochigi, Japan, operated by the Yagan Railway.

== Lines ==
Kawaji-Onsen Station is served by the Yagan Railway Aizu Kinugawa Line and is located 4.8 rail kilometers from end of the line at Shin-Fujiwara Station.

== Station layout ==
The station has a single elevated island platform, with the station building located underneath.

== History ==
Kawaji-Onsen Station opened on October 9, 1986.

== Surrounding area ==
- National Route 121
- Kinugawa River
