= Ojika-Kōgen Station =

Railway station in Nikkō, Tochigi Prefecture, Japan

Ojika-Kōgen Station 男鹿高原駅
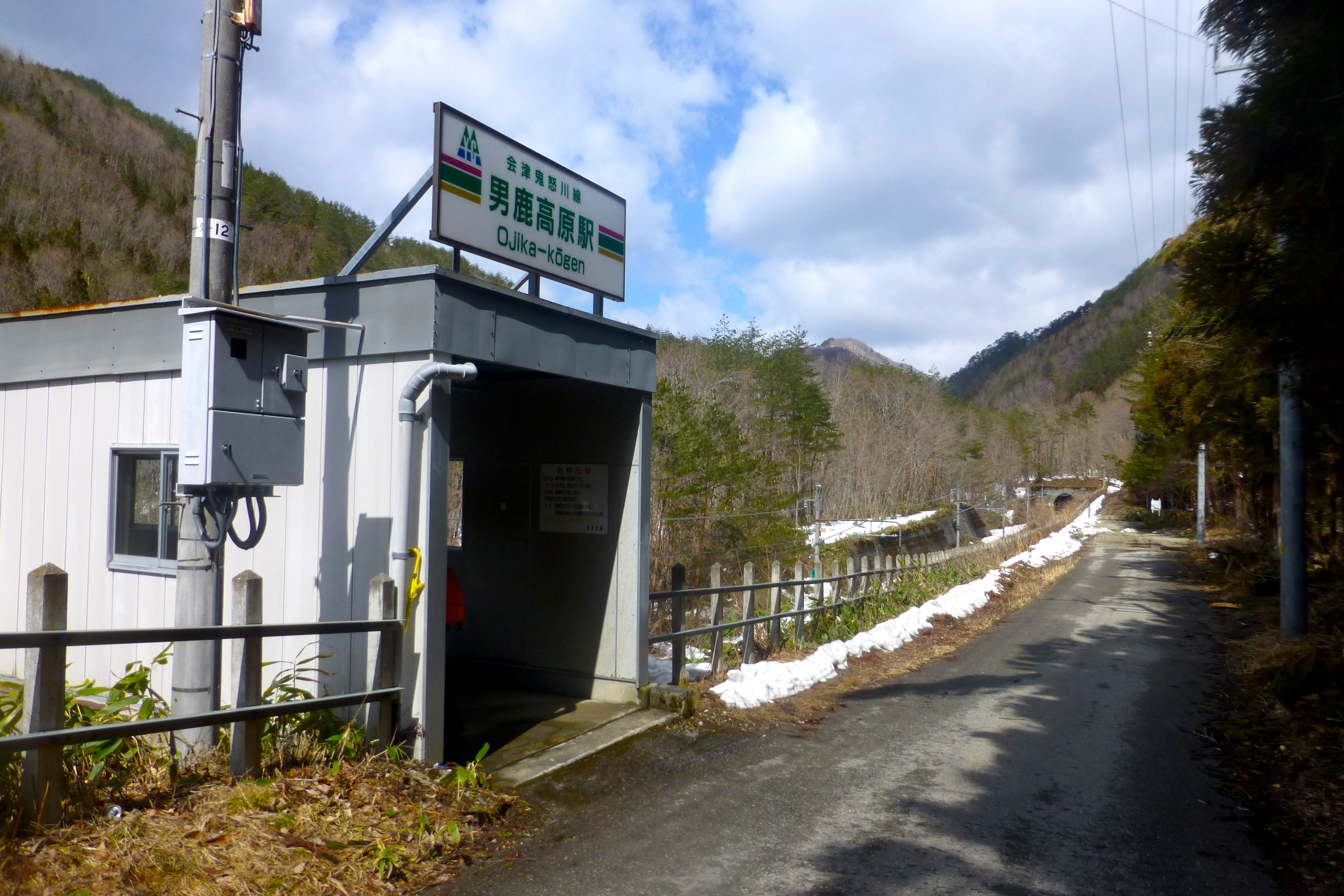
- Ojika-Kōgen Station in March 2014

General information
- Location: Yokogawa 680-5, Nikkō-shi, Tochigi-ken 321-2801; Japan
- Coordinates: 37°02′52″N 139°43′26″E
- Operator: Yagan Railway
- Distance: 25.0 km from Shin-Fujiwara
- Platforms: 1 side platform

Other information
- Website: Official website

History
- Opened: October 9, 1986

Passengers
- FY2016: 1 daily

Services
Preceding station	Yagan Railway	Following station
Kamimiyori-Shiobara-Onsenguchi towards Shin-Fujiwara	Aizu Kinugawa Line	Aizukōgen-Ozeguchi Terminus
Location
- Location within Tochigi Prefecture Location within Japan

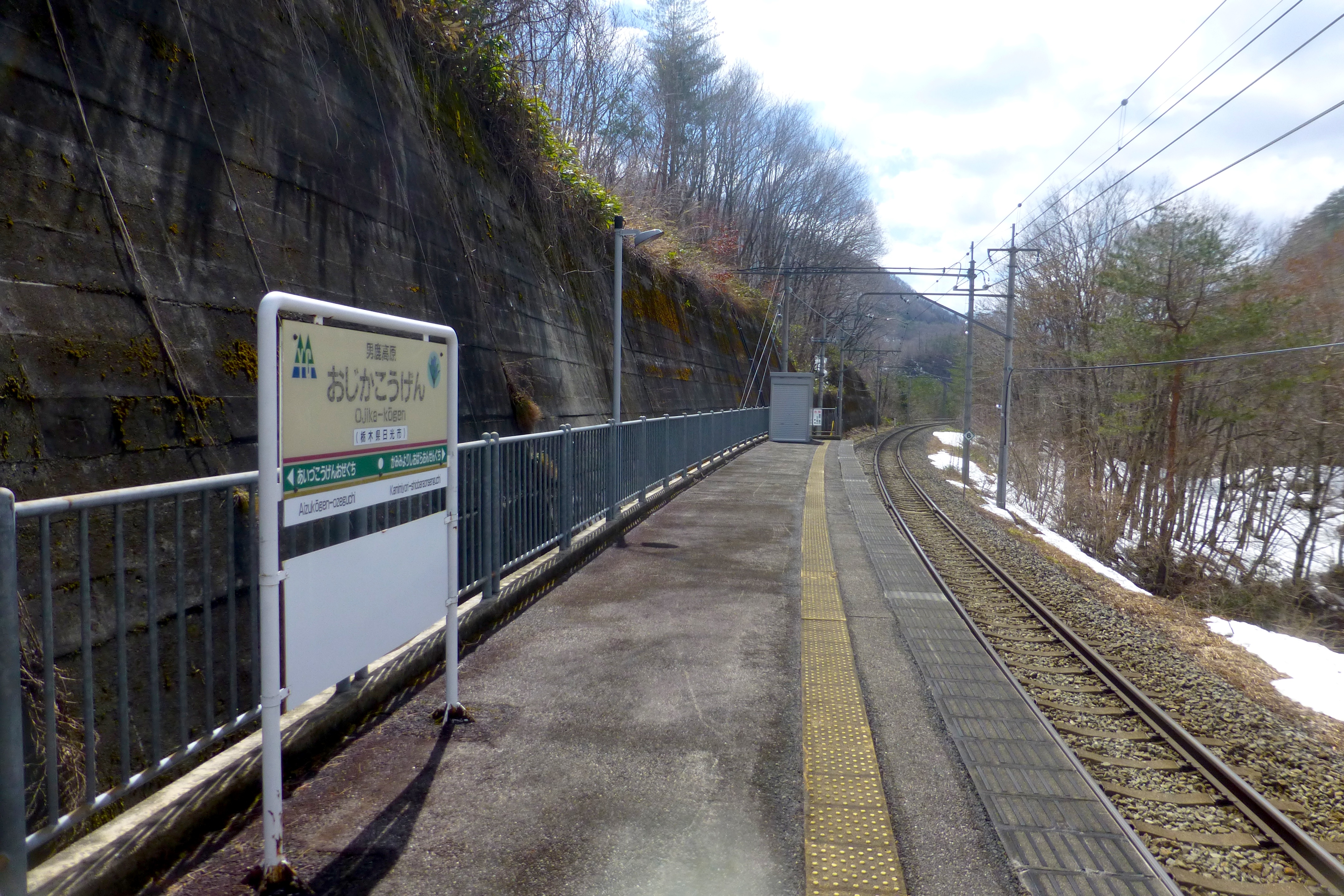
Station platform.

Ojika-Kōgen Station (男鹿高原駅, Ojika-Kōgen-eki) is a railway station in the city of Nikkō, Tochigi, Japan, operated by the Yagan Railway.

== Lines ==
Ojika-Kōgen Station is served by the Yagan Railway Aizu Kinugawa Line and is located 25.0 rail kilometers from the opposing terminal at Shin-Fujiwara Station.

== Station layout ==
The station has a single side platform connected to the station building, serving traffic in both directions.

== History ==
Ojika-Kōgen Station opened on October 9, 1986.

== Others ==
This station is stopped by the last service of Tobu Limited Express Revaty Aizu bound to Asakusa Station and local trains.

== Surrounding area ==
The station is located in an isolated mountain area, with no buildings around for several hundred meters.

== In media ==
The second episode of the series "Tetsu Ota Michiko, 20,000 km" is dedicated to this station
