= Kamimiyori-Shiobara-Onsenguchi Station =

Railway station in Nikkō, Tochigi Prefecture, Japan

Kamimiyori-Shiobara-Onsenguchi Station 上三依塩原温泉口駅
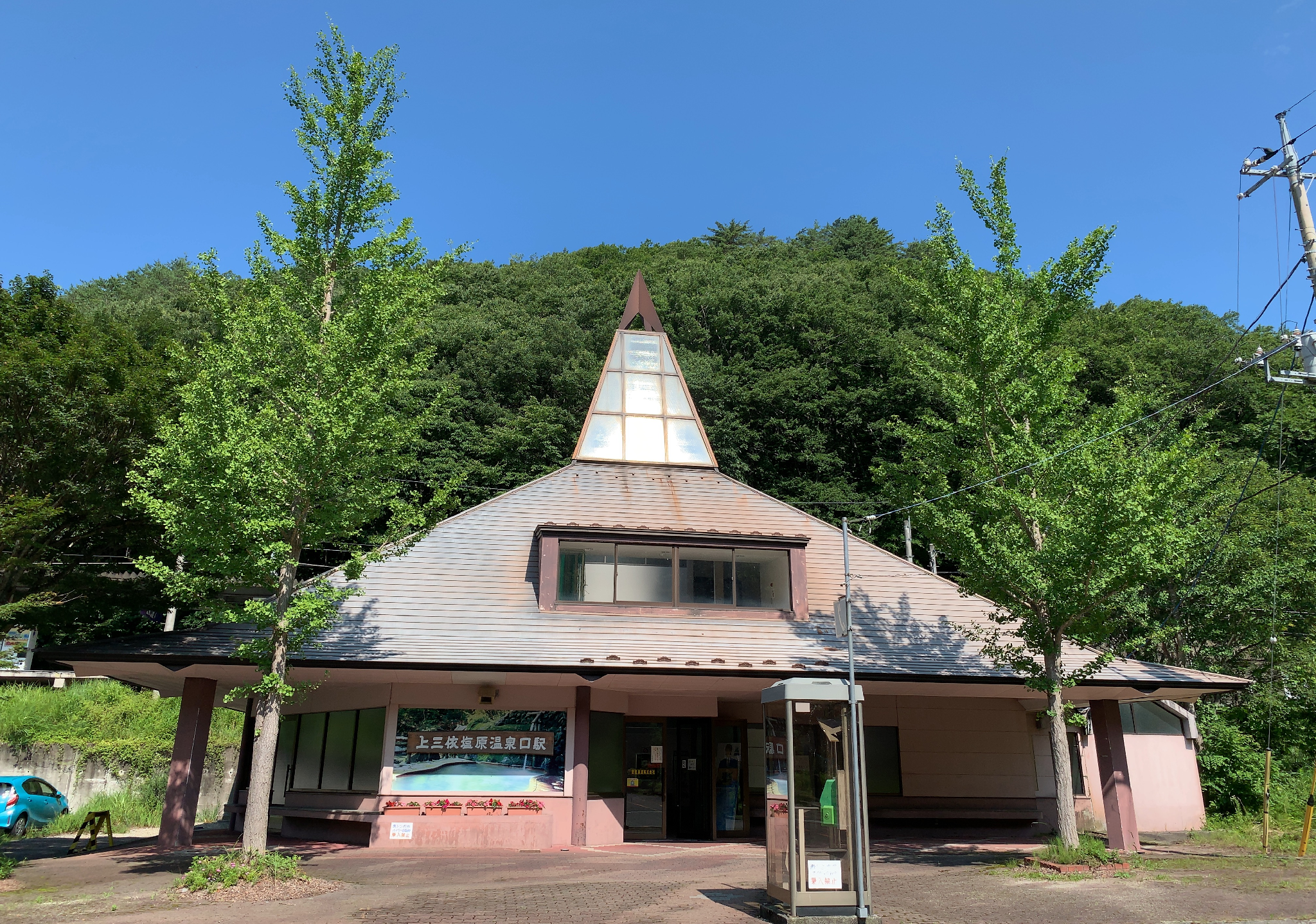
- Kamimiyori-Shiobara-Onsenguchi Station in August 2019

General information
- Location: Kamimimori 804, Nikkō-shi, Tochigi-ken 321-2802; Japan
- Coordinates: 37°00′52″N 139°43′38″E
- Operator: Yagan Railway
- Line: ■ Aizu Kinugawa Line
- Distance: 21.0 km from Shin-Fujiwara
- Platforms: 1 island platform

Other information
- Website: Official website

History
- Opened: October 9, 1986
- Former names: Shimotsuke Kamimiyori (to 2006)

Passengers
- FY2016: 19 daily

Services
Preceding station	Yagan Railway	Following station
Nakamiyori-Onsen towards Shin-Fujiwara	Aizu	Aizukōgen-Ozeguchi Terminus
Nakamiyori-Onsen towards Shin-Fujiwara	Aizu Kinugawa Line	Ojika-Kōgen towards Aizukōgen-Ozeguchi
Location
- Location within Tochigi Prefecture Location within Japan

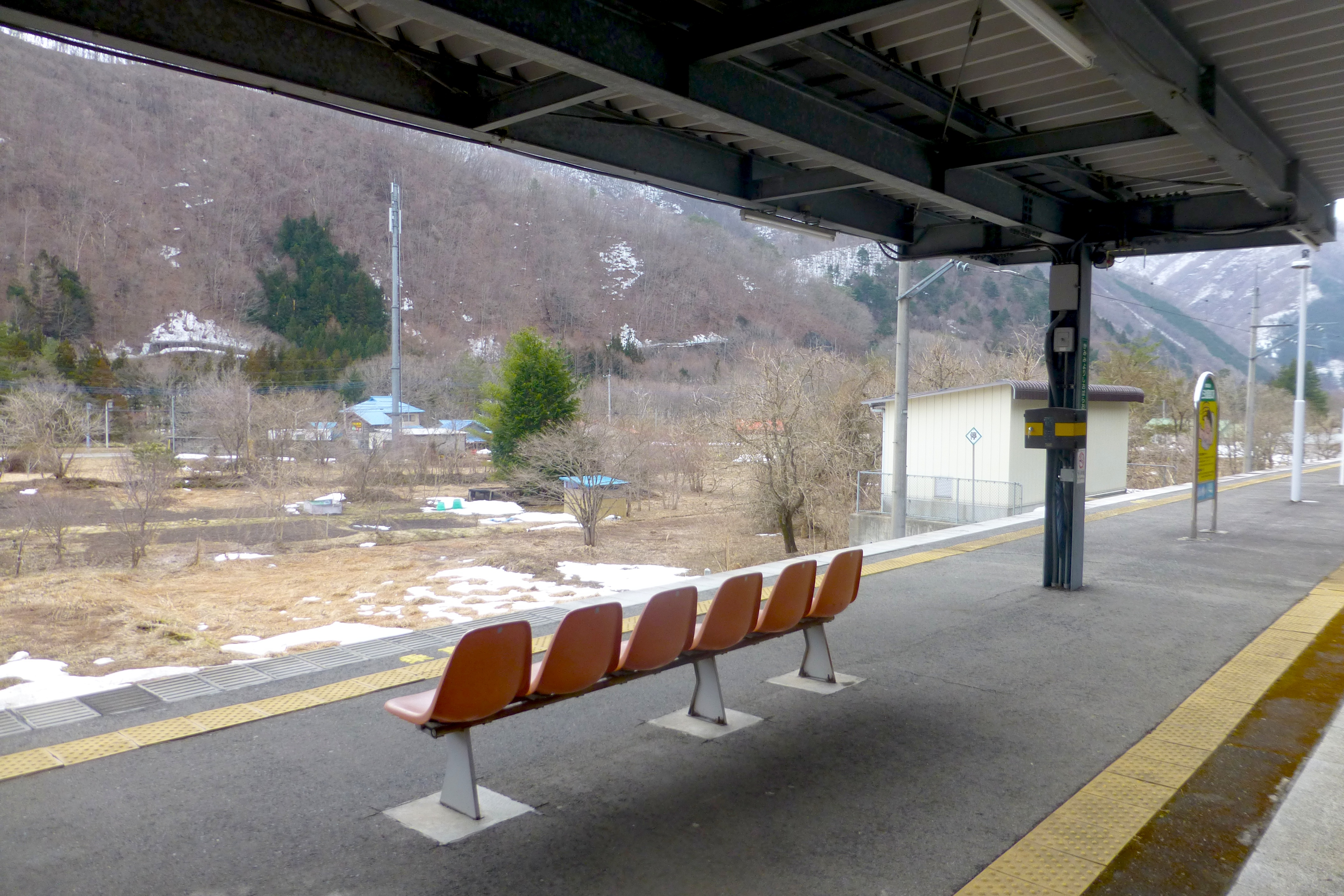
Station platform.

Kamimiyori-Shiobara-Onsenguchi Station (上三依塩原温泉口駅, Kamimiyori-Shiobara-Onsenguchi-eki) is a railway station in the city of Nikkō, Tochigi, Japan, operated by the Yagan Railway.

== Lines ==
Kamimiyori-Shiobara-Onsenguchi Station is served by the Yagan Railway Aizu Kinugawa Line and is located 21.0 rail kilometers from the opposing terminal at Shin-Fujiwara Station.

== Station layout ==
The station has a single island platform.

== Buses ==
Name	Via	Destination (the Last bus stop)	Company	Note
Yū Bus Kami-Miyori Line	Motoyu Onsen	Shiobara Onsen Bus Terminal	Nasu-Shiobara Municipality Bus (JR Bus)	When you available on Yū Bus, you have better to purchase One Diary Ticket (400 yen). Please change buses at the Yuu-no-hara bus stop or at the last bus stop, so you are able to go to Nishi-Nasuno Station and Nasu-Shiobara Station by riding JR Bus Shiobara Line from Yuu-no-hara bus stop or Shiobara Onsen Bus Terminal. On the Shiobara Line, passengers who have Japan Rail Pass can ride at free.

== History ==
Kamimiyori-Shiobara-Onsenguchi Station opened on October 9, 1986, as Shimotsuke Kamimiyori Station (下野上三依駅). It was renamed to its present name in March 2006.

== Surrounding area ==
- National Route 121
- National Route 400
