= Ryūōkyō Station =

Railway station in Nikkō, Tochigi Prefecture, Japan

Ryūōkyō Station 龍王峡駅
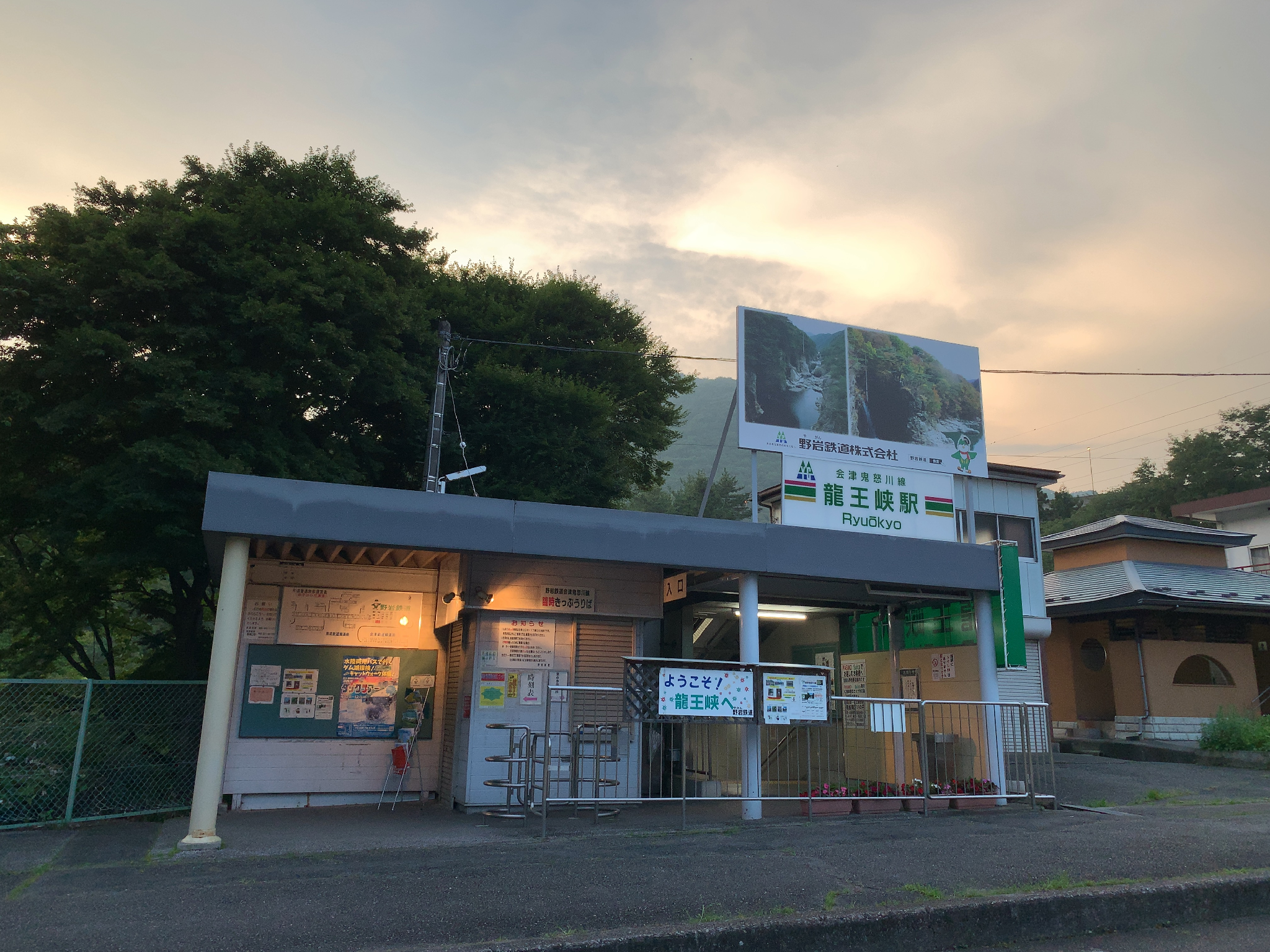
- Ryūōkyō Station in August 2019

General information
- Location: Fujiwara 1357, Nikkō-shi, Tochigi-ken 321-2521; Japan
- Coordinates: 36.8611°N 139.7187°E
- Operator: Yagan Railway
- Line: ■ Aizu Kinugawa Line
- Distance: 1.7 km from Shin-Fujiwara
- Platforms: 1 island platform

Other information
- Website: Official website

History
- Opened: October 9, 1986

Passengers
- FY2016: 66 daily

Services
Preceding station	Yagan Railway	Following station
Shin-Fujiwara Terminus	Aizu	Kawaji-Onsen towards Aizukōgen-Ozeguchi
Shin-Fujiwara Terminus	Aizu Kinugawa Line	Kawaji-Onsen towards Aizukōgen-Ozeguchi
Location
- Location within Tochigi Prefecture Location within Japan

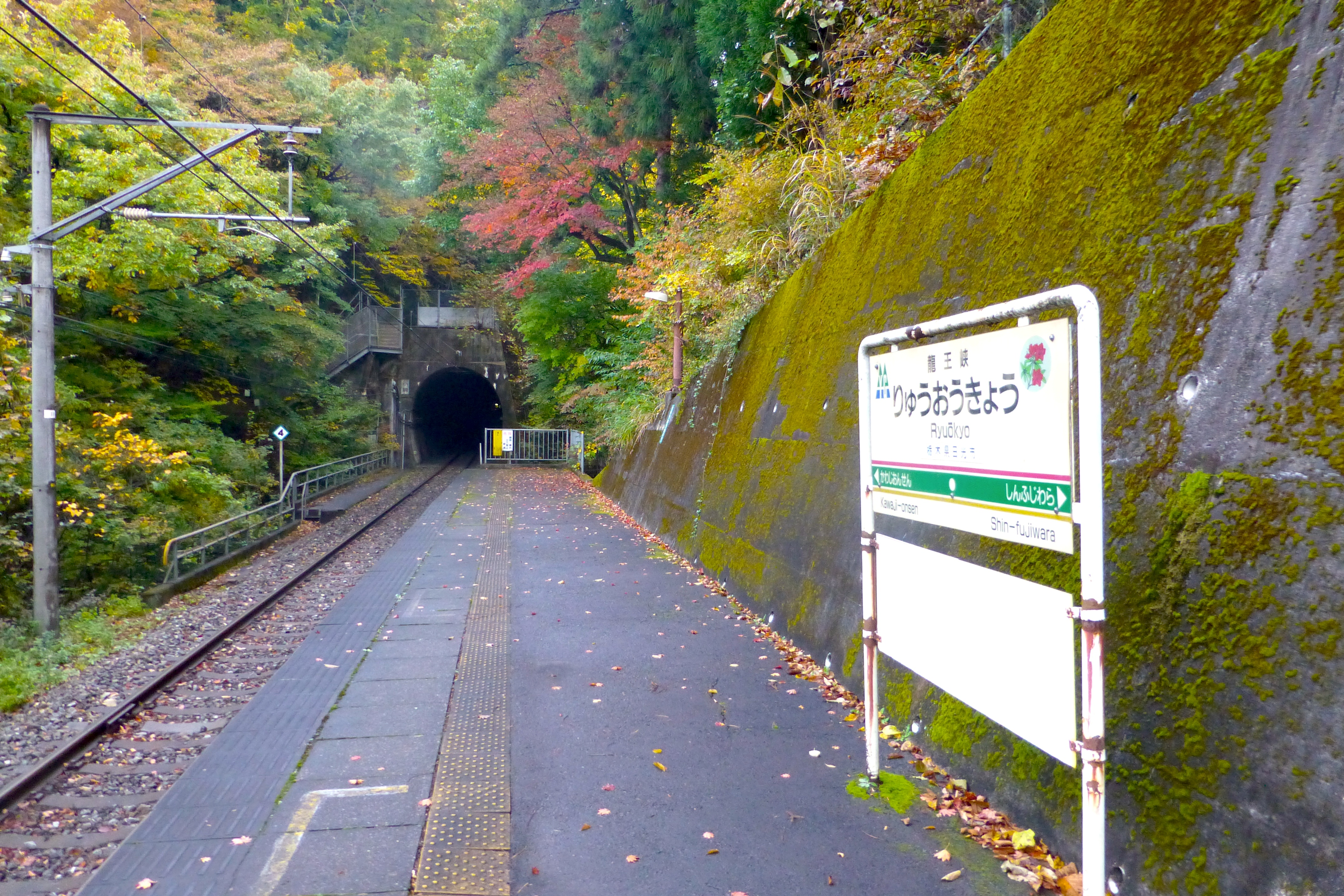
Station platform

Ryūōkyō Station (龍王峡駅, Ryūōkyō-eki) is a railway station on the Yagan Railway Aizu Kinugawa Line in the city of Nikkō, Tochigi, Japan, operated by the Yagan Railway.

== Lines ==
Ryūōkyō Station is served by the Yagan Railway Aizu Kinugawa Line and is located 1.7 kilometers from the starting point of the line at Shin-Fujiwara Station.

== Station layout ==
The station consists of a single side platform, serving traffic in both directions, with half of the platform located within a tunnel.

== History ==
Ryūōkyō Station opened on October 9, 1986.

== Surrounding area ==
- National Route 121
- Ryūōkyō Gorge
