= Kinugawa Line =

Kinugawa Line are names of two railway lines that serves Kinugawa hot spring resort area in Tochigi Prefecture of Japan. It may refer to:

- Railway Lines
  - Japan
    - Tōbu Kinugawa Line.
    - Yagan Railway Aizu Kinugawa Line.
