= Shoma Sato (baseball, born 1989) =

Japanese baseball player (born 1989)

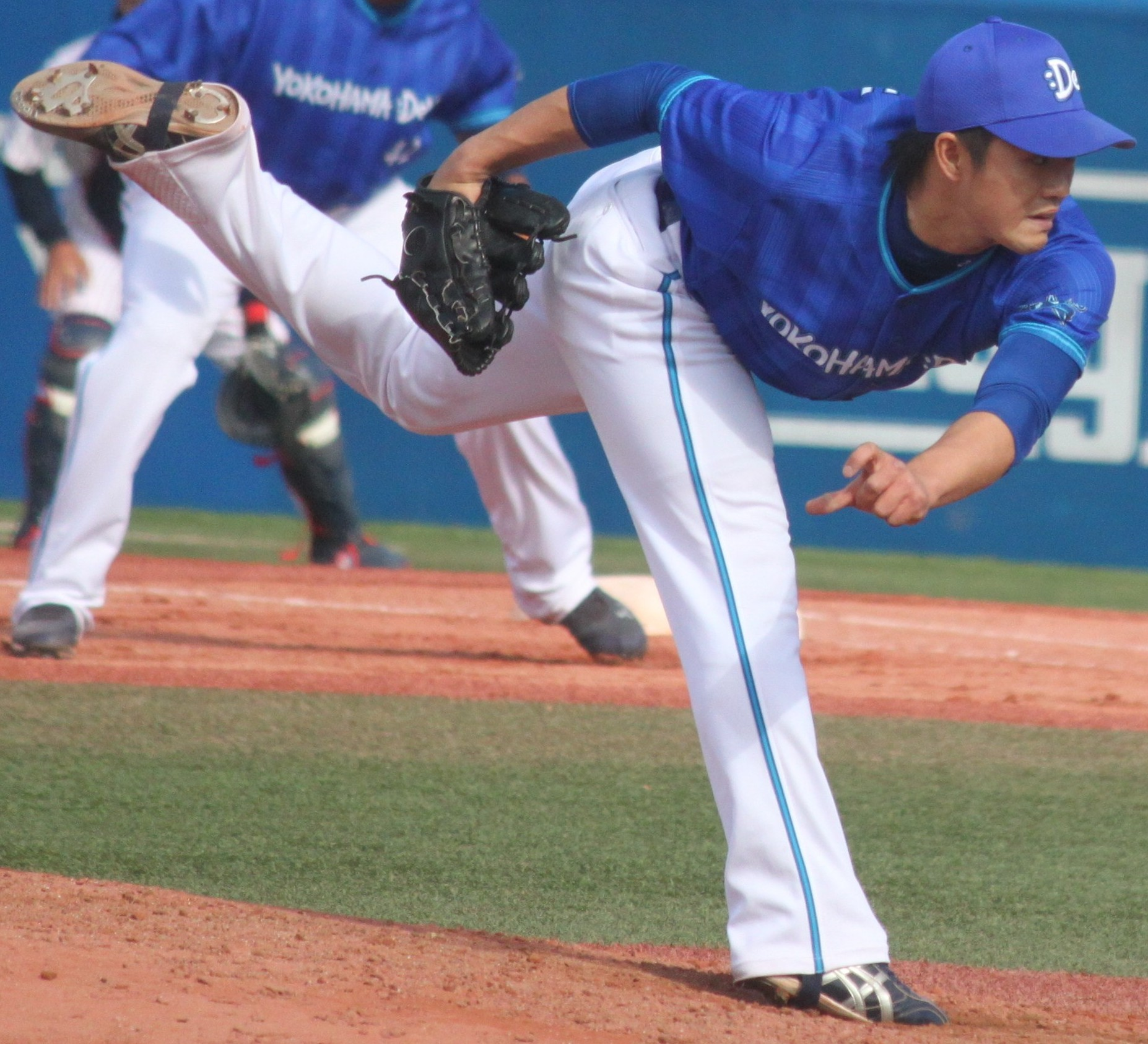
- Sato with the Yokohama DeNA BayStars
- Pitcher
- Born: August 18, 1989 (age 36); Nikkō, Tochigi, Japan
- Bats: Left Throws: Left

debut
- April 9, 2008, for the Yokohama BayStars

NPB statistics (through 2018 season)
- Win–loss record: 0–1
- Earned run average: 4.57
- Strikeouts: 46
- Stats at Baseball Reference

Teams
- Yokohama BayStars/Yokohama DeNA BayStars (2010–2013); Hokkaido Nippon-Ham Fighters (2014); Hiroshima Toyo Carp (2015–2018)

Shoma Sato (佐藤 祥万, Satō Shōma; born August 18, 1989 in Nikkō, Tochigi, Japan) is a professional Japanese baseball player. He plays pitcher for the Hiroshima Toyo Carp.
