= Kinugawa Onsen =

Hot spring resort in Tochigi Prefecture, Japan

Coordinates: 36°49′29″N 139°42′59″E

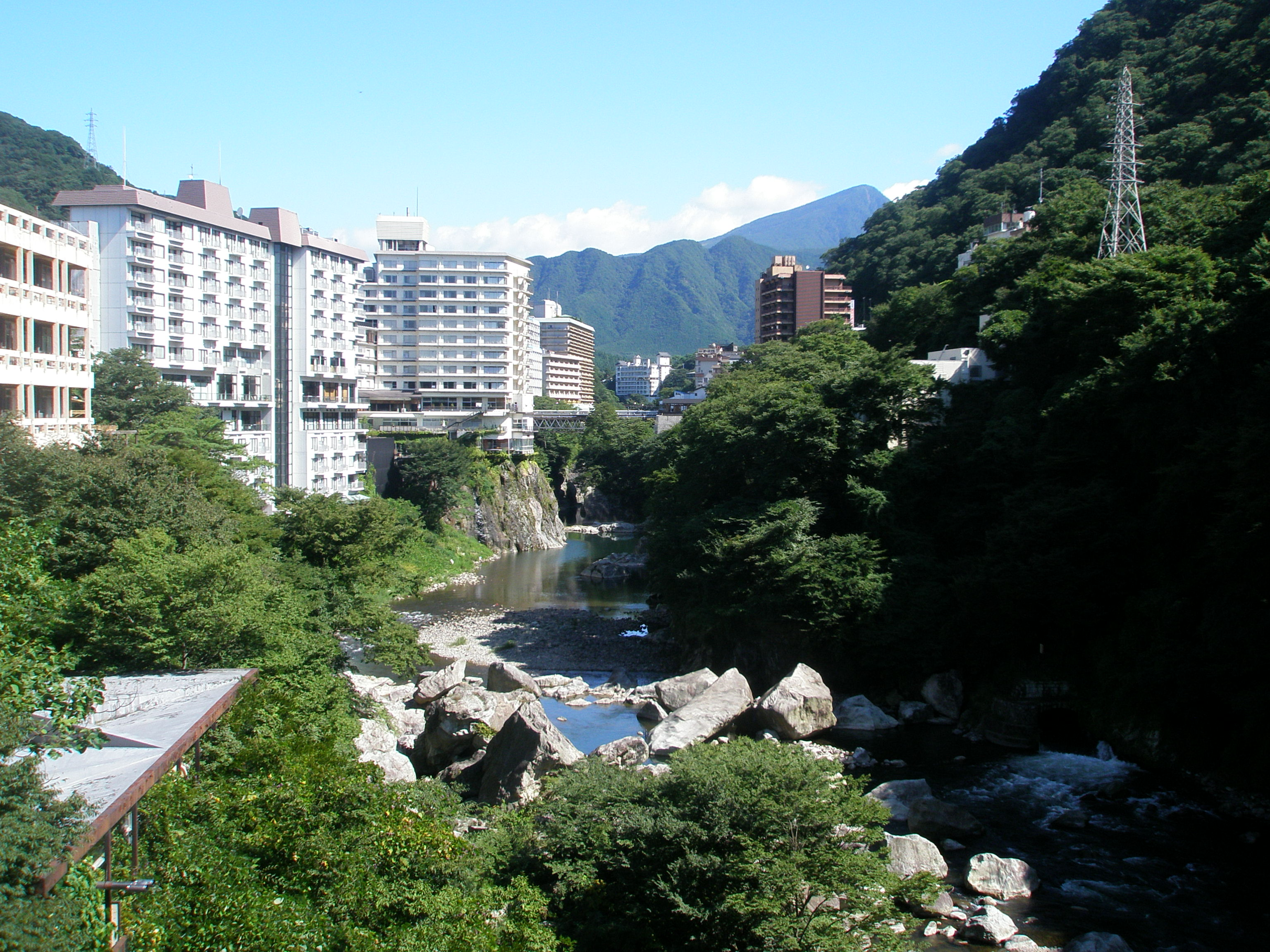
Kinugawa Onsen

Kinugawa Onsen (鬼怒川温泉) is a hot spring resort in the city of Nikkō, Tochigi, Japan. The place is named after the Kinugawa River (literally "angry demon river"), which flows through it.

== History ==
Two hours by train from Tokyo, hot springs were first found in the area in the early Meiji period.

The area was extensively developed for tourism in the 1970s, but has since experienced severe economic difficulties after a downturn caused by the 1990s recession, exacerbated by troubles at the insolvent Ashikaga Bank, a major local lender. In 2005, the book Ugly Japan (悪い景観100景) by Waseda University urban planning professor Shigeru Itoh listed Kinugawa Onsen as the third-ugliest place in the country. Many of the resort buildings and homes are derelict and the area is being reclaimed by surrounding forest.

However, in 2008 the city's tourism industry received a boost as high car and airplane fuel costs have caused travelers to seek tourist destinations more easily reachable by train, such as the Kinugawa Onsen.

== Local attractions ==
Close by is Edo Wonderland Nikko Edomura, a traditionally themed culture and amusement park containing theatres, workshops, games, ninja and oiran shows. It is populated with samurai, ninja, geisha and common folk. Within 8-minute walking distance from Kinugawa is the Tobu World Square which boasts 102 exquisitely crafted 1:25 scale models of the most famous, UNESCO-designated World Cultural and Heritage Sites, complete with 140,000 1:25 miniature people.

== Transportation ==
Both train lines run in parallel and stop at Kinugawa Onsen Station

- Tōbu Kinugawa Line
- Yagan Railway Aizu Kinugawa Line
