= Yagan Railway =

Third-sector Japanese railway company

An Aizu Kinugawa Line train pulling out of Ryūōkyō Station, 2013

Yagan Railway Co., Ltd. (野岩鉄道株式会社, Yagan Tetsudō Kabushiki-gaisha) is a Japanese third-sector railway running between Tochigi and Fukushima prefectures. It operates a single railway line, the Aizu Kinugawa Line (会津鬼怒川線, Aizu Kinugawa-sen).

The name of the line comes from the kanji characters of the ancient provinces of Shimotsuke (下野; now Tochigi Prefecture) and Iwashiro (岩代; now Fukushima Prefecture). The company's major shareholders include the two prefectural governments.

== Aizu Kinugawa Line ==
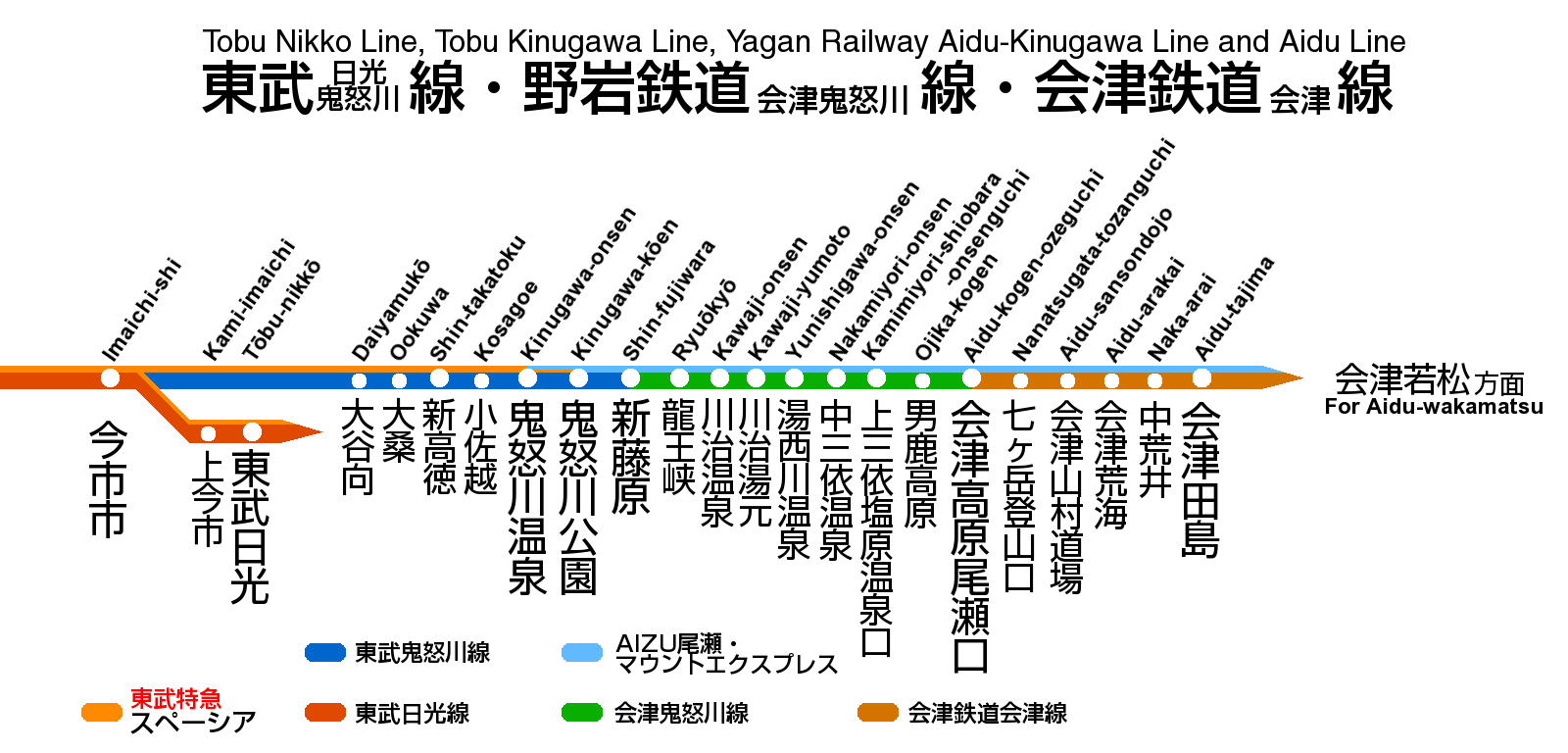
Route map of Aizu Kinugawa Line

The Aizu Kinugawa Line (会津鬼怒川線, Aizu Kinugawa-sen) is a 30.7 kilometre railway line from Shin-Fujiwara Station in Nikkō, Tochigi to Aizukōgen-Ozeguchi Station, Minamiaizu, Fukushima.

The name of the line comes from the Aizu area (at the northern end of the line) and the Kinugawa Onsen hot spring resort area (at the southern end). Its nickname is the Hot Spa. Line (ほっとスパ・ライン, Hotto Supa Rain; lit. 'Relaxing Spa Line').

=== Stations ===
- Limited Express Revaty Aizu (リバティ会津) is a Limited Express service operated by Tobu Railway.
- Aizu Mount Express (Aizuマウントエクスプレス) is a rapid train operated by Aizu Railway.
- Ozatoro Tenbo Ressha Yu-Meguri (お座トロ展望列車 湯めぐり号) is a sightseeing train operated by Aizu Railway.

Station	Japanese	Distance (km)		Revaty Aizu	Aizu Mount Express	Open-car Ozatoro Tenbō Ressha	Transfers	Location	
Station	Japanese	Between stations	Total	Revaty Aizu	Aizu Mount Express	Open-car Ozatoro Tenbō Ressha	Transfers	Location	
↑Through service to/from Tobu Kinugawa Line and Limited Express trains to/from Asakusa↑
Shin-Fujiwara	新藤原	-	0.0	●	●	●	Tōbu Kinugawa Line	Nikkō	Tochigi Prefecture
Ryūōkyō	龍王峡	1.7	1.7	●	●	↓		Nikkō	Tochigi Prefecture
Kawaji-Onsen	川治温泉	3.1	4.8	●	●	↓		Nikkō	Tochigi Prefecture
Kawaji-Yumoto	川治湯元	1.2	6.0	●	●	●		Nikkō	Tochigi Prefecture
Yunishigawa-Onsen	湯西川温泉	4.3	10.3	●	●	●		Nikkō	Tochigi Prefecture
Nakamiyori-Onsen	中三依温泉	6.5	16.8	●	●	↓		Nikkō	Tochigi Prefecture
Kamimiyori-Shiobara-Onsenguchi	上三依塩原温泉口	4.2	21.0	●	●	●		Nikkō	Tochigi Prefecture
Ojika-Kōgen	男鹿高原	4.0	25.0	↕	↕	↓		Nikkō	Tochigi Prefecture
Aizukōgen-Ozeguchi	会津高原尾瀬口	5.7	30.7	●	●	●	■ Aizu Railway Aizu Line	Minamiaizu, Fukushima, Minamiaizu District	Fukushima
↓Through service to/from Aizu Railway Aizu Line↓

== Rolling stock ==
- Yagan Railway owns two 2-car sets of Tobu 6050 series EMU for use on Local services
- Tobu Railway operates Tobu 500 series Tobu 500 series "Revaty" EMU on Revaty Aizu services
- Aizu Railway owned DMU trains[ja] operate through services to/from Aizu Line

== History ==
The construction began as a part of the Japan Railway Construction Corporation. It was taken over by Yagan Railway.

- 9 October 1986: Starts operations.
- 12 October 1990: Direct service onto Aizu-Tajima Station on Aizu Railway Aizu Line begins.
- 18 March 2006: The nickname Hot Spa. Line debuts.
