= Nikkō =

Nikkō 日光市
- City
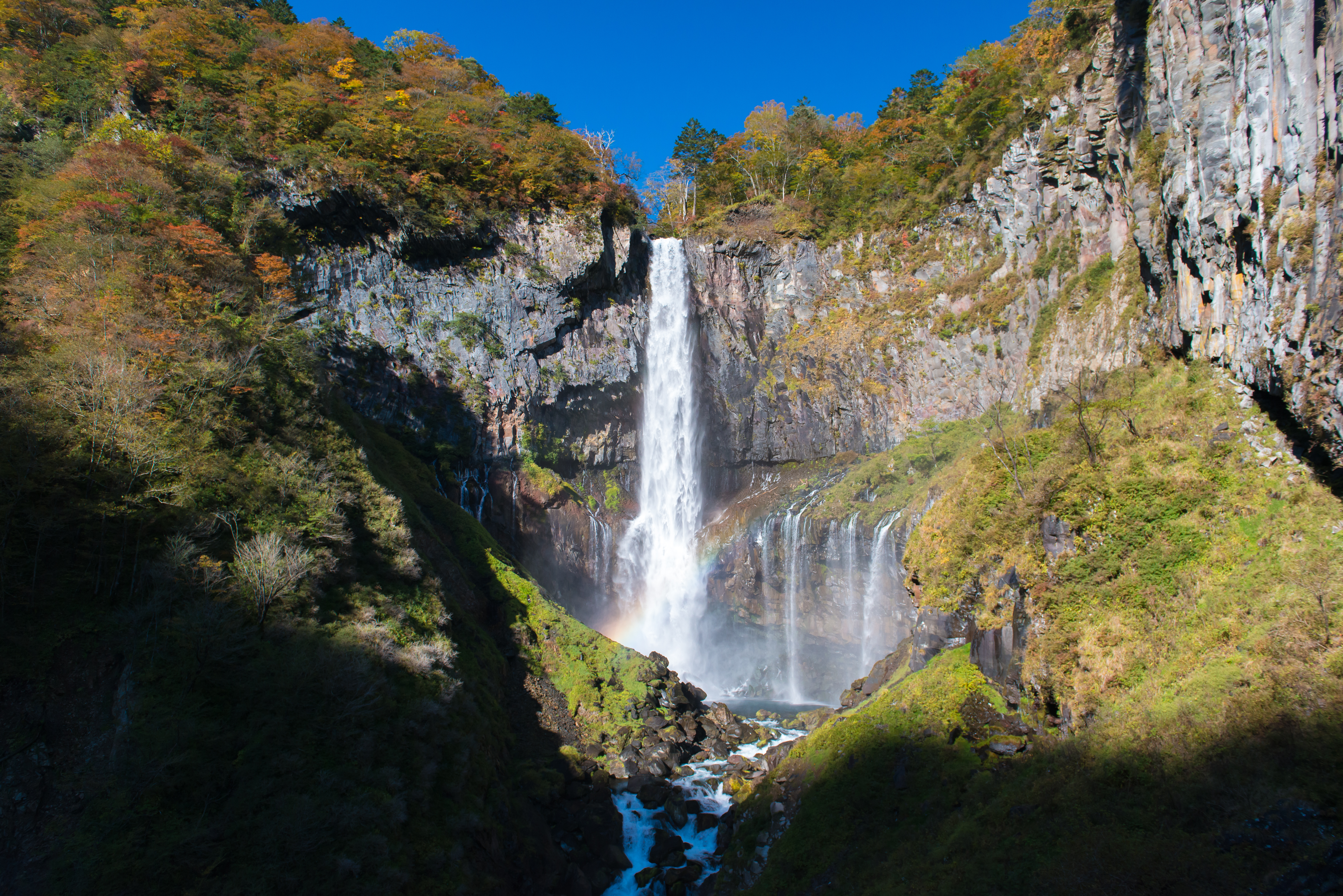
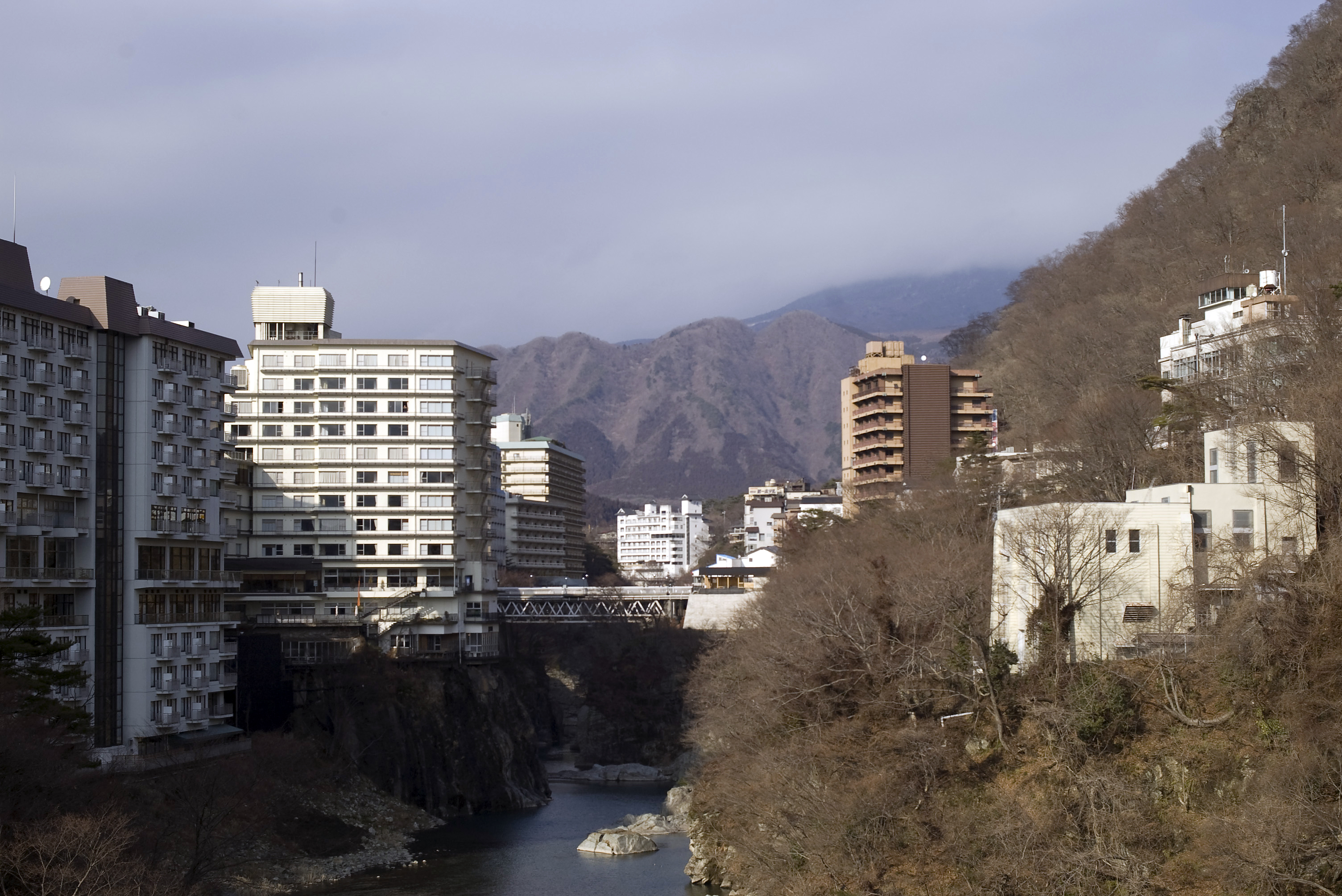
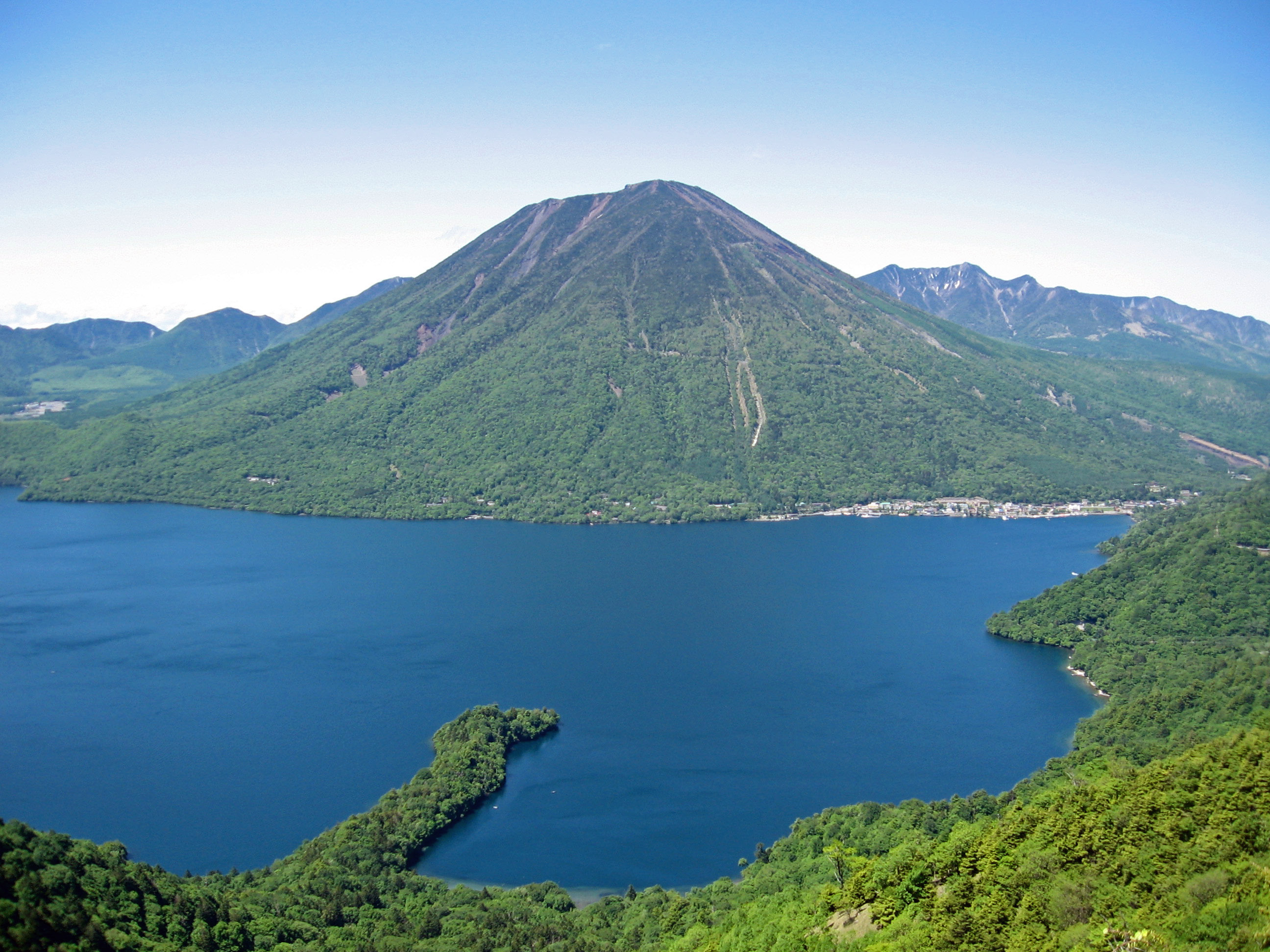
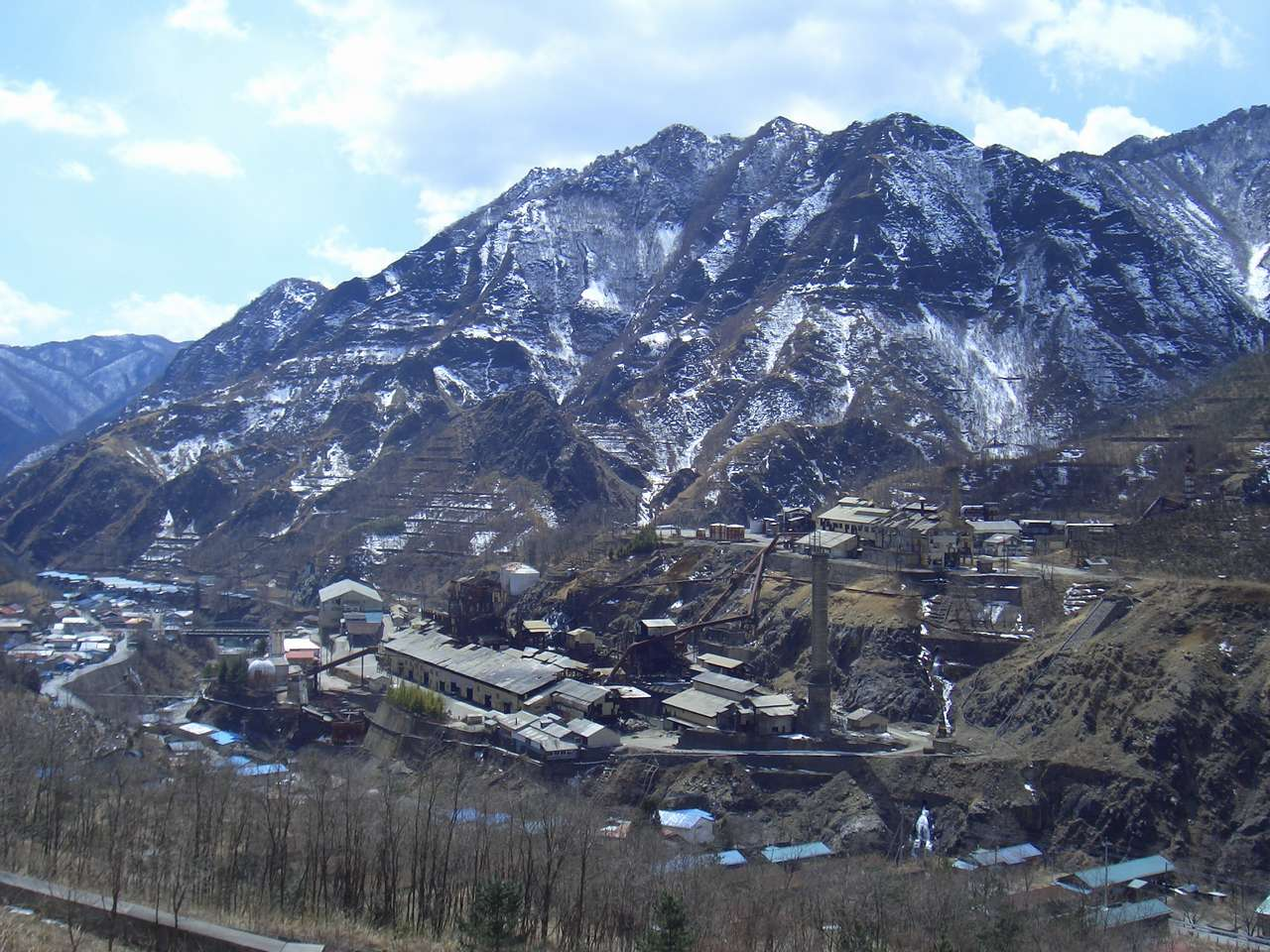
- From top, left to right: Nikkō Tōshō-gū, Kegon Falls, Kinugawa Onsen, Lake Chūzenji and Mount Nantai, and Ashio Copper Mine

- Flag Seal

- The location of Nikkō in Tochigi Prefecture

- Coordinates: 36°43′11.4″N 139°41′53.4″E
- Country: Japan
- Region: Kantō
- Prefecture: Tochigi
- First official recorded: 766 AD
- City Settled: February 11, 1954

Government
  - Mayor: Tetsuo Setaka (from May 2025)

Area
  - Total: 1,449.83 km^{2} (559.78 sq mi)

Population (October 1, 2021)
  - Total: 76,452
  - Density: 52.732/km^{2} (136.57/sq mi)
- Time zone: UTC+9 (Japan Standard Time)
- Phone number: 0288-22-1111
- Address: 1 Imaichi Honchō, Nikkō-shi, Tochigi-ken 321–1292
- Climate: Dfb
- Website: Official website
- Symbols
- Bird: Cettia diphone, Alcedo atthis
- Flower: Rhododendron, Hemerocallidoideae
- Tree: Betula platyphylla, Autumn leaf color

Nikkō (日光市, Nikkō-shi; IPA: [ɲikkoꜜːɕi]) is a city in Tochigi Prefecture, Japan. As of 2 December 2020, the city's population was 80,239, in 36,531 households. The population density was 55 persons per km^{2}. The total area of the city is 1,449.83 square kilometres (559.78 sq mi).

Nikkō is a popular destination for Japanese and international tourists. Attractions include the mausoleum of shōgun Tokugawa Ieyasu at the Nikkō Tōshō-gū shrine, and that of his grandson Tokugawa Iemitsu (Iemitsu-byō Taiyū-in), along with Futarasan shrine, which dates to the year 767. There are many famous onsen (hot springs) in the area. Elevations range from 200 to 2,000 meters.

The Japanese saying "Never say kekkō until you've seen Nikkō" (日光を見ずして結構と言うなかれ)" – with kekkō (結構) meaning splendid, magnificent, or satisfied – is a reflection of the beauty and sites in Nikkō.

== Geography ==
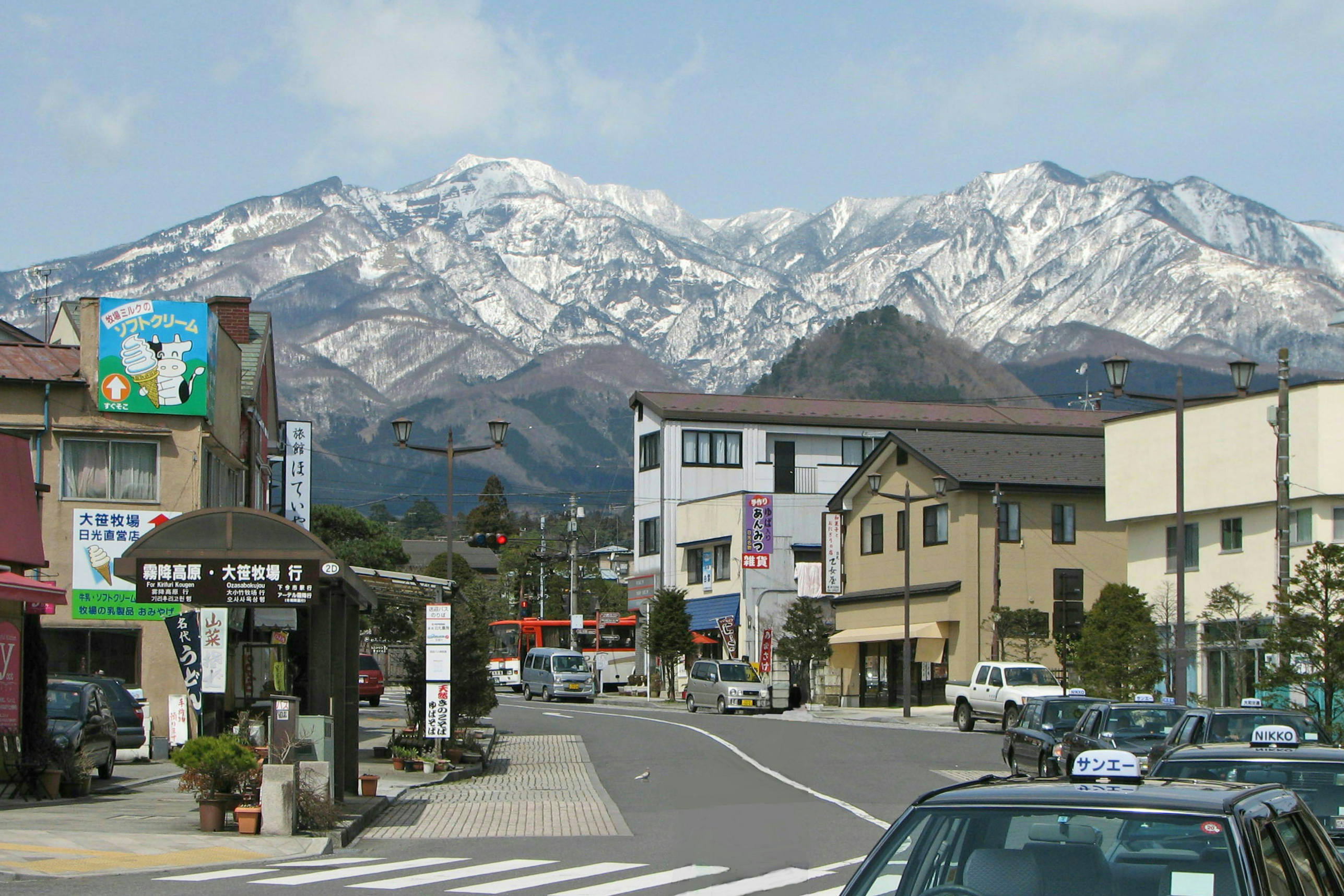
Central Nikkō city

Nikkō covers a vast area (1,449.83 km^{2}) of rural northwestern Tochigi, approximately 140 km north of Tokyo and 35 km west of Utsunomiya, the capital of Tochigi Prefecture. It is the third-largest city (by area) in Japan, behind Takayama and Hamamatsu.

Both the Watarase River and the Kinugawa River pass through the city. Lake Chūzenji and the Kegon Falls lie in Nikkō, as does the Nikko Botanical Garden. The city's many mountains and waterfalls have made it an important source of hydroelectric power. The area has been used for mining copper, aluminium and concrete.

The weather in Nikkō is fairly similar to that of the northern island of Hokkaido, even though Nikkō is much closer to Tokyo than Hokkaido. The elevation of Nikkō plays an important role in this fact. It will usually get cooler as one ascends the mountain. The average temperature of Nikkō is around 7 °C (44 °F) with the warmest months reaching only about 22 °C (72 °F) and the coldest reaching down to about −8 °C (17 °F).

=== Surrounding municipalities ===
Fukushima Prefecture

- Hinoemata
- Minamiaizu

Gunma Prefecture

- Katashina
- Midori
- Numata

Tochigi Prefecture

- Kanuma
- Nasushiobara
- Shioya
- Utsunomiya

== Climate ==
Nikkō has a humid continental climate (Köppen Dfb). It has warm summers, and cold winters with heavy snowfall. The average annual temperature in Nikkō is 7.2 °C (45 °F). The average annual rainfall is 2,202 millimetres (87 in). September is the wettest month. The temperatures are highest on average in August, at around 18.8 °C (66 °F), and lowest in January, at around −3.9 °C (25 °F).

The highest temperature ever recorded in Nikkō was 30.8 °C (87.4 °F) on 8 August 2018. The coldest temperature ever recorded was −18.7 °C (−1.7 °F) on 15 March 1984.

Climate data for Oku-Nikkō, Nikkō (1991–2020 normals, extremes 1944–present)
| Month | Jan | Feb | Mar | Apr | May | Jun | Jul | Aug | Sep | Oct | Nov | Dec | Year |
|---|---|---|---|---|---|---|---|---|---|---|---|---|---|
| Record high °C (°F) | 12.7 (54.9) | 14.0 (57.2) | 18.7 (65.7) | 23.2 (73.8) | 26.4 (79.5) | 28.9 (84.0) | 30.4 (86.7) | 30.8 (87.4) | 28.4 (83.1) | 25.3 (77.5) | 19.1 (66.4) | 17.2 (63.0) | 30.8 (87.4) |
| Mean daily maximum °C (°F) | −0.3 (31.5) | 0.6 (33.1) | 4.2 (39.6) | 10.1 (50.2) | 15.3 (59.5) | 18.0 (64.4) | 22.1 (71.8) | 22.9 (73.2) | 18.9 (66.0) | 13.7 (56.7) | 8.6 (47.5) | 2.8 (37.0) | 11.4 (52.5) |
| Daily mean °C (°F) | −3.9 (25.0) | −3.5 (25.7) | −0.3 (31.5) | 5.1 (41.2) | 10.3 (50.5) | 14.0 (57.2) | 18.2 (64.8) | 18.8 (65.8) | 15.2 (59.4) | 9.6 (49.3) | 4.4 (39.9) | −1.0 (30.2) | 7.2 (45.0) |
| Mean daily minimum °C (°F) | −7.9 (17.8) | −7.8 (18.0) | −4.6 (23.7) | 0.2 (32.4) | 5.5 (41.9) | 10.4 (50.7) | 14.9 (58.8) | 15.6 (60.1) | 11.9 (53.4) | 5.7 (42.3) | 0.2 (32.4) | −4.9 (23.2) | 3.3 (37.9) |
| Record low °C (°F) | −16.5 (2.3) | −16.7 (1.9) | −18.7 (−1.7) | −11.0 (12.2) | −5.4 (22.3) | −0.4 (31.3) | 3.7 (38.7) | 6.0 (42.8) | −0.2 (31.6) | −3.9 (25.0) | −9.7 (14.5) | −14.7 (5.5) | −18.7 (−1.7) |
| Average precipitation mm (inches) | 57.5 (2.26) | 48.6 (1.91) | 108.5 (4.27) | 154.4 (6.08) | 177.1 (6.97) | 228.8 (9.01) | 280.5 (11.04) | 332.5 (13.09) | 409.0 (16.10) | 240.9 (9.48) | 97.6 (3.84) | 58.4 (2.30) | 2,202 (86.69) |
| Average snowfall cm (inches) | 63 (25) | 56 (22) | 57 (22) | 13 (5.1) | 0 (0) | 0 (0) | 0 (0) | 0 (0) | 0 (0) | 0 (0) | 3 (1.2) | 33 (13) | 227 (89) |
| Average precipitation days (≥ 0.5 mm) | 8.2 | 8.5 | 11.1 | 12.4 | 13.0 | 16.3 | 18.1 | 17.7 | 16.2 | 12.8 | 7.6 | 7.9 | 149.8 |
| Average snowy days | 24.7 | 21.2 | 20.8 | 8.4 | 1.1 | 0.0 | 0.0 | 0.0 | 0.0 | 0.8 | 8.3 | 21.1 | 108.1 |
| Average relative humidity (%) | 66 | 65 | 67 | 69 | 75 | 87 | 88 | 89 | 88 | 83 | 73 | 69 | 76 |
| Mean monthly sunshine hours | 164.6 | 167.0 | 189.5 | 187.1 | 174.1 | 107.8 | 109.6 | 128.2 | 105.1 | 122.8 | 152.1 | 153.2 | 1,763.1 |
Source: Japan Meteorological Agency (1991–2020 normals, extremes 1944–present)

Climate data for Dorobu, Nikkō (1991–2020 normals, extremes 1977–present)
| Month | Jan | Feb | Mar | Apr | May | Jun | Jul | Aug | Sep | Oct | Nov | Dec | Year |
|---|---|---|---|---|---|---|---|---|---|---|---|---|---|
| Record high °C (°F) | 13.4 (56.1) | 16.7 (62.1) | 21.1 (70.0) | 27.9 (82.2) | 30.5 (86.9) | 32.2 (90.0) | 32.9 (91.2) | 33.3 (91.9) | 31.6 (88.9) | 26.5 (79.7) | 23.0 (73.4) | 20.5 (68.9) | 33.3 (91.9) |
| Mean daily maximum °C (°F) | 1.5 (34.7) | 2.4 (36.3) | 6.3 (43.3) | 13.0 (55.4) | 18.3 (64.9) | 21.0 (69.8) | 24.8 (76.6) | 26.1 (79.0) | 21.7 (71.1) | 16.3 (61.3) | 11.0 (51.8) | 4.8 (40.6) | 13.9 (57.0) |
| Daily mean °C (°F) | −3.9 (25.0) | −3.3 (26.1) | 0.3 (32.5) | 6.3 (43.3) | 11.7 (53.1) | 15.5 (59.9) | 19.4 (66.9) | 20.2 (68.4) | 16.3 (61.3) | 10.1 (50.2) | 4.3 (39.7) | −1.0 (30.2) | 8.0 (46.4) |
| Mean daily minimum °C (°F) | −9.4 (15.1) | −9.1 (15.6) | −5.2 (22.6) | −0.1 (31.8) | 5.1 (41.2) | 10.4 (50.7) | 15.0 (59.0) | 15.7 (60.3) | 11.7 (53.1) | 4.8 (40.6) | −1.4 (29.5) | −6.0 (21.2) | 2.6 (36.7) |
| Record low °C (°F) | −19.5 (−3.1) | −19.5 (−3.1) | −19.1 (−2.4) | −10.9 (12.4) | −4.5 (23.9) | −0.3 (31.5) | 5.1 (41.2) | 5.4 (41.7) | −0.4 (31.3) | −6.8 (19.8) | −12.1 (10.2) | −17.4 (0.7) | −19.5 (−3.1) |
| Average precipitation mm (inches) | 70.7 (2.78) | 55.0 (2.17) | 80.4 (3.17) | 101.1 (3.98) | 118.9 (4.68) | 160.5 (6.32) | 206.1 (8.11) | 216.9 (8.54) | 299.0 (11.77) | 186.7 (7.35) | 64.7 (2.55) | 67.4 (2.65) | 1,627.3 (64.07) |
| Average snowfall cm (inches) | 114 (45) | 94 (37) | 73 (29) | 12 (4.7) | 0 (0) | 0 (0) | 0 (0) | 0 (0) | 0 (0) | 0 (0) | 6 (2.4) | 64 (25) | 365 (144) |
| Average precipitation days (≥ 1.0 mm) | 10.0 | 9.7 | 10.7 | 10.4 | 10.7 | 13.6 | 15.7 | 13.9 | 12.9 | 10.2 | 7.0 | 9.3 | 134.0 |
| Mean monthly sunshine hours | 137.5 | 148.3 | 181.9 | 191.8 | 188.6 | 121.9 | 116.6 | 134.5 | 112.9 | 130.0 | 146.9 | 138.8 | 1,749.7 |
Source: Japan Meteorological Agency (1991–2020 normals, extremes 1977–present)

Climate data for Ikari, Nikkō (1991–2020 normals, extremes 1977–present)
| Month | Jan | Feb | Mar | Apr | May | Jun | Jul | Aug | Sep | Oct | Nov | Dec | Year |
|---|---|---|---|---|---|---|---|---|---|---|---|---|---|
| Record high °C (°F) | 13.5 (56.3) | 17.7 (63.9) | 23.3 (73.9) | 30.0 (86.0) | 30.3 (86.5) | 33.3 (91.9) | 35.1 (95.2) | 35.3 (95.5) | 33.9 (93.0) | 26.4 (79.5) | 21.4 (70.5) | 17.8 (64.0) | 35.3 (95.5) |
| Mean daily maximum °C (°F) | 2.8 (37.0) | 3.8 (38.8) | 8.0 (46.4) | 14.6 (58.3) | 19.5 (67.1) | 22.1 (71.8) | 25.7 (78.3) | 26.9 (80.4) | 22.4 (72.3) | 16.8 (62.2) | 11.7 (53.1) | 5.8 (42.4) | 15.0 (59.0) |
| Daily mean °C (°F) | −1.7 (28.9) | −1.0 (30.2) | 2.6 (36.7) | 8.4 (47.1) | 13.6 (56.5) | 17.3 (63.1) | 21.1 (70.0) | 21.9 (71.4) | 17.9 (64.2) | 12.0 (53.6) | 6.2 (43.2) | 1.1 (34.0) | 10.0 (50.0) |
| Mean daily minimum °C (°F) | −5.5 (22.1) | −5.3 (22.5) | −1.9 (28.6) | 3.1 (37.6) | 8.4 (47.1) | 13.4 (56.1) | 17.9 (64.2) | 18.7 (65.7) | 14.6 (58.3) | 8.2 (46.8) | 1.8 (35.2) | −2.7 (27.1) | 5.9 (42.6) |
| Record low °C (°F) | −15.4 (4.3) | −16.5 (2.3) | −17.0 (1.4) | −6.0 (21.2) | −0.6 (30.9) | 3.5 (38.3) | 9.3 (48.7) | 9.3 (48.7) | 3.7 (38.7) | −3.8 (25.2) | −8.5 (16.7) | −13.1 (8.4) | −17.0 (1.4) |
| Average precipitation mm (inches) | 62.4 (2.46) | 45.4 (1.79) | 83.3 (3.28) | 108.9 (4.29) | 127.0 (5.00) | 162.1 (6.38) | 225.7 (8.89) | 237.7 (9.36) | 276.0 (10.87) | 167.3 (6.59) | 71.9 (2.83) | 59.6 (2.35) | 1,627.2 (64.06) |
| Average precipitation days (≥ 1.0 mm) | 9.1 | 8.1 | 9.1 | 9.7 | 10.6 | 14.3 | 16.6 | 15.0 | 14.0 | 10.6 | 7.1 | 8.6 | 132.8 |
| Mean monthly sunshine hours | 134.6 | 142.5 | 176.8 | 186.2 | 183.6 | 135.3 | 135.8 | 150.0 | 112.6 | 122.3 | 136.6 | 135.2 | 1,754.9 |
Source: Japan Meteorological Agency (1991–2020 normals, extremes 1977–present)

== Demographics ==
Per Japanese census data, the population of Nikkō has declined over the past 20 years.

Historical population
| Year | Pop. | ±% |
|---|---|---|
| 1950 | 107,674 | — |
| 1960 | 110,468 | +2.6% |
| 1970 | 99,415 | −10.0% |
| 1980 | 97,515 | −1.9% |
| 1990 | 97,859 | +0.4% |
| 2000 | 98,143 | +0.3% |
| 2010 | 90,064 | −8.2% |
| 2020 | 77,661 | −13.8% |
Japanese census data

== History ==
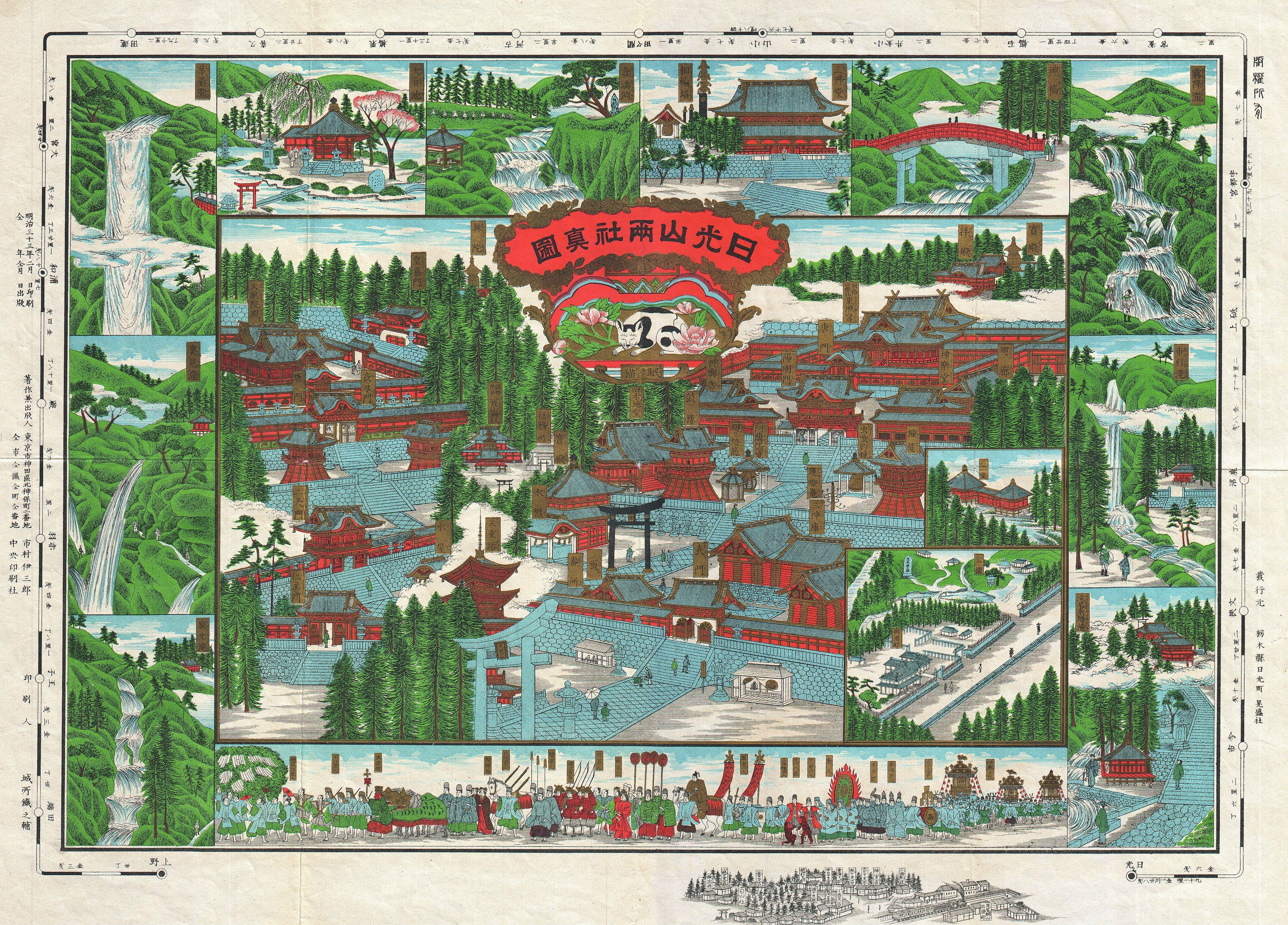
A 1901 map of the city sights

Shōdō Shōnin (勝道上人) established the temple of Rinnō-ji in 766, followed by the temple of Chūzen-ji in 784. The village of Nikkō developed around these temples. The shrine of Nikkō Tōshō-gū was completed in 1617 and became a major draw of visitors to the area during the Edo period. It is known as the burial place of the shōgun Tokugawa Ieyasu. A number of new roads were built during this time to provide easier access to Nikkō from surrounding regions. Nikkō Tōshō-gū, Futarasan Shrine, and Rinnō-ji now form the UNESCO World Heritage Site Shrines and Temples of Nikkō.

During the Meiji period, Nikkō developed as a mountain resort, and became particularly popular among foreign visitors to Japan. The Japanese National Railways began service to Nikkō in 1890 with the Nikkō Line, followed by Tobu Railway in 1929 with its Nikkō Line.

Nikkō was incorporated as a town in 1889, part of Kamitsuga District, with the establishment of the modern municipalities system. It was upgraded to city status in 1954 after merging with the neighboring village of Okorogawa.

In 1999, 103 structural sites encompassing the Shrines and Temples of Nikkō were inscribed on the UNESCO World Heritage List.

In March 2006, Nikkō absorbed the neighboring city of Imaichi, the town of Ashio from Kamitsuga District, the town of Fujihara, and the village of Kuriyama, both from Shioya District, to create what is officially the new and expanded city of Nikkō. The new city hall is located at the former Imaichi City Hall. The former Nikkō City Hall is now known as Nikkō City Hall-Nikkō Satellite Office.

== Government ==
Nikkō has a mayor-council form of government with a directly elected mayor and a unicameral city legislature of 24 members. Nikkō contributes two members to the Tochigi Prefectural Assembly. In terms of national politics, the town is part of Tochigi 2nd district of the lower house of the Diet of Japan.

== Economy ==
Nikkō is heavily dependent on tourism to its historical and scenic sites and hot spring resorts. Hydroelectric power production, food processing, and the non-ferrous metals industry are also important components of the economy.

Nikkō has been recognized by Japan's Office for the Promotion of Regional Revitalization (Kishida Cabinet Secretariat), which promotes the development of new technologies to combat depopulation, for its "high standard" of digital transformation/telework infrastructure. Related projects have been awarded over ¥19.1M in government grants.

== Local attractions ==
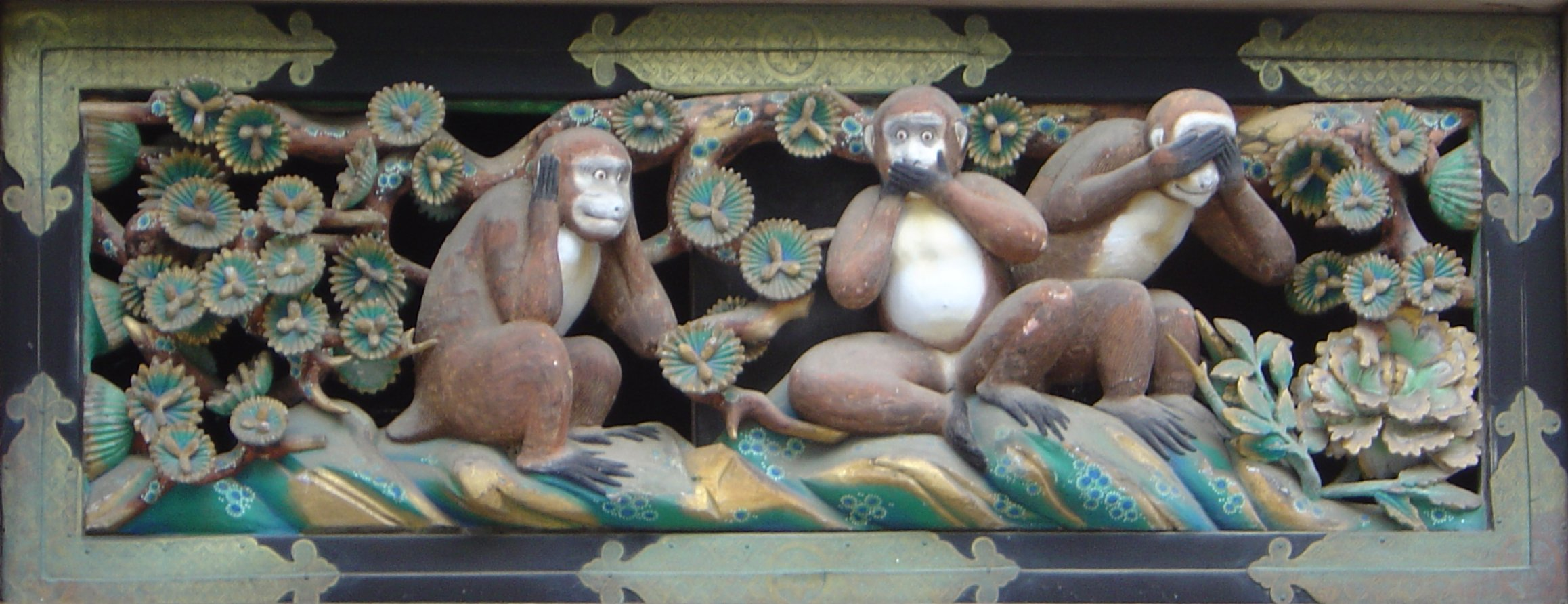
Hear no evil, speak no evil, see no evil

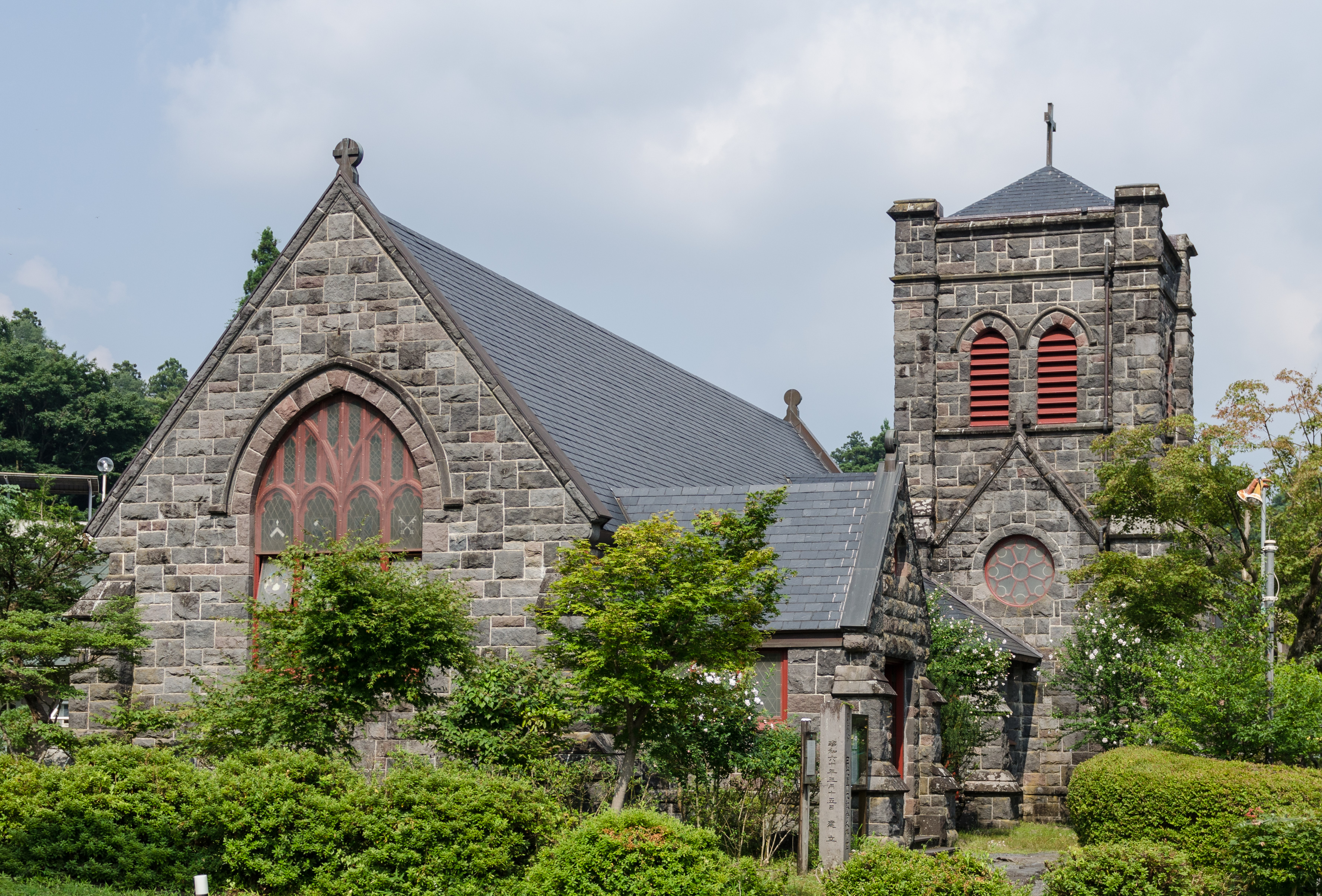
True Light Anglican Church (日光真光教会礼拝堂), built 1916

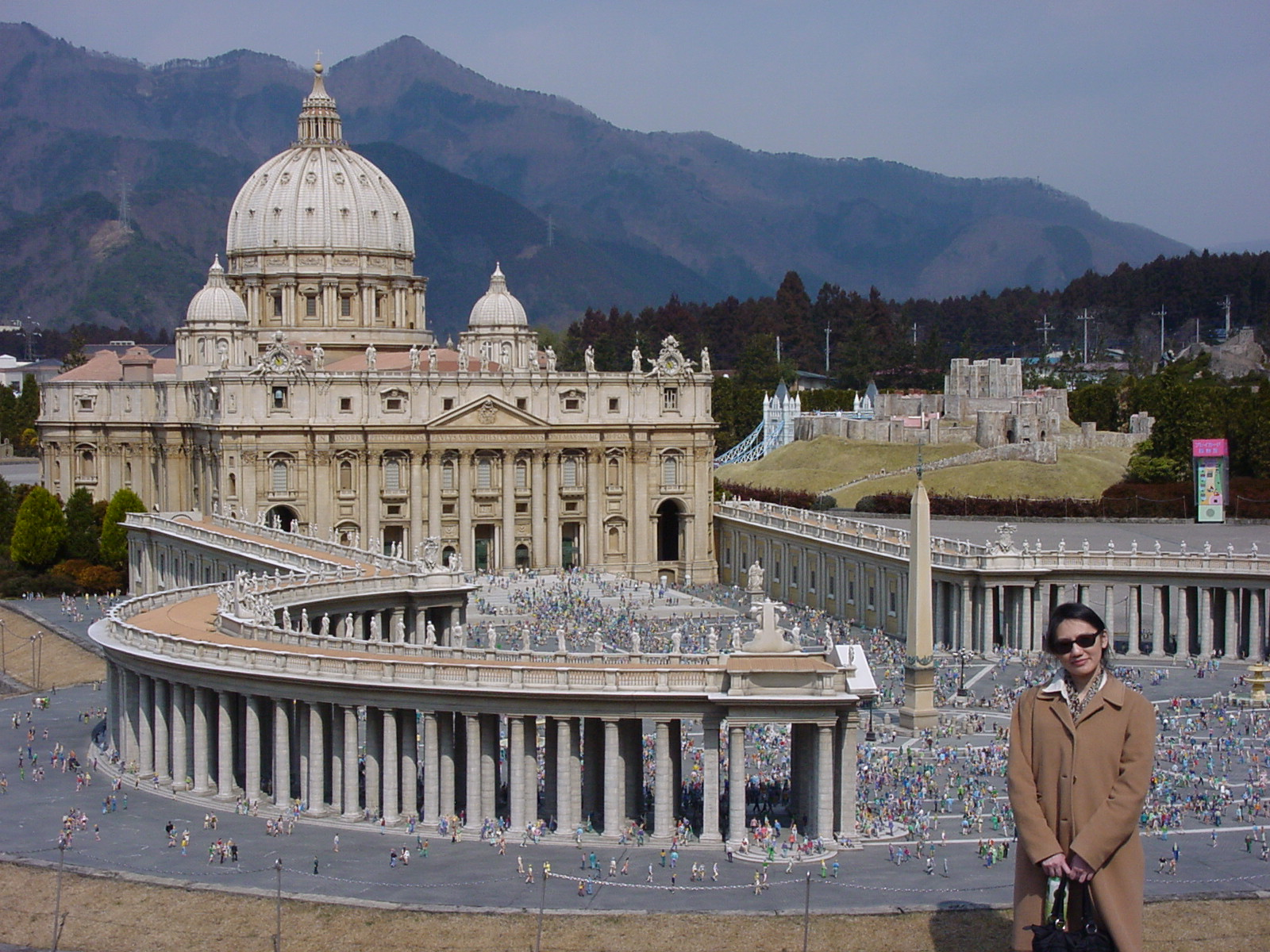
Tobu World Square

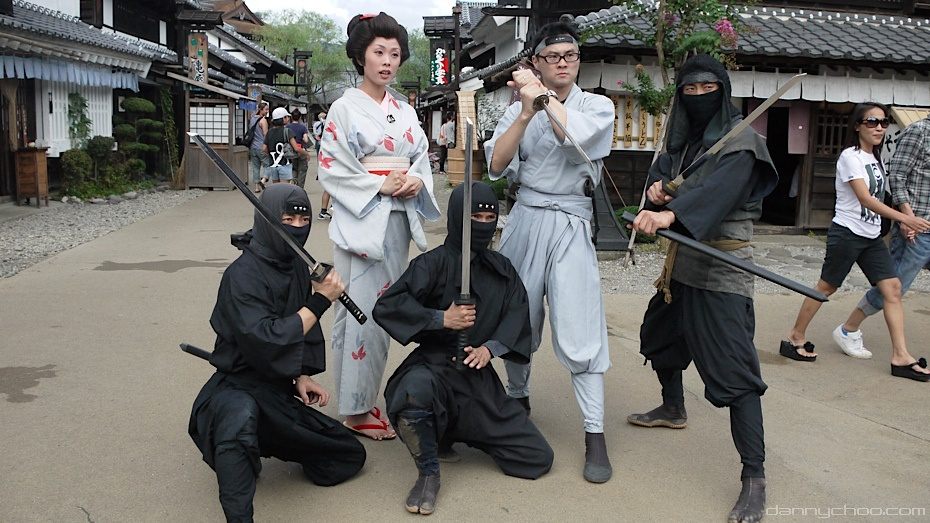
Edo Wonderland Nikko Edomura
- Cedar Avenue of Nikko
- Edo Wonderland Nikko Edomura (historical theme park)
- Futarasan Shrine
- Jizō Bosatsu statues on the Kanman Walk. A little out of the main city, locals often tell visitors to count the statues while walking, and to recount while walking back. The number is often different, fueling a legend amongst locals.
- Kanmangafuchi Abyss is a place that was formed from the lava from the eruption of Mt. Nantai
- Lake Chūzenji
- Nikko Botanical Garden
- Nikkō Tōshō-gū
  - The three wise monkeys ("See no evil, hear no evil, speak no evil")
- Tamozawa Imperial Villa
- Shrines and Temples of Nikkō (Nikkō Tōshō-gū, Futarasan Shrine, and Rinnō-ji)
- Rinnō-ji
  - Shōyō-en Garden
  - Taiyū-in Mausoleum
- Nikko is well known for its monkeys that walk around the town in the winter looking for food.

== Transportation ==
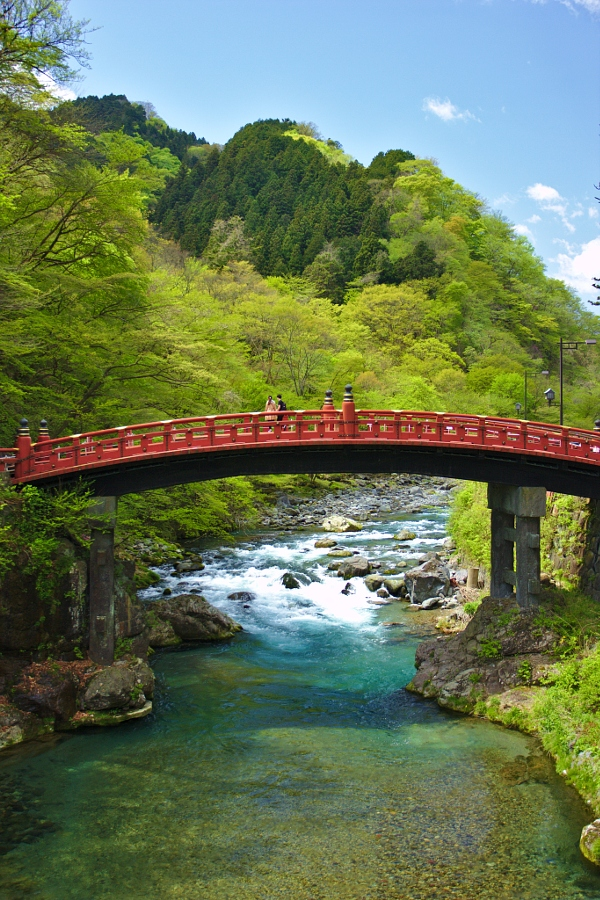
The Shinkyo bridge, one of the symbols of Nikko

=== Railway ===
JR East – Nikkō Line

- Fubasami - Shimotsuke-Ōsawa - Imaichi - Nikkō

Tōbu Railway – Tōbu Nikkō Line

- Shimo-Goshiro - Myōjin - Shimo-Imaichi - Kami-Imaichi - Tōbu Nikkō

Tōbu Railway – Tōbu Kinugawa Line

- Shimo-Imaichi - Daiya-Mukō - Ōkuwa - Shin-Takatoku - Kosagoe - Tobu World Square - Kinugawa-Onsen - Kinugawa-Kōen - Shin-Fujiwara

Yagan Railway

- Shin-Fujiwara - Ryūōkyō - Kawaji-Onsen - Kawaji-Yumoto - Yunishigawa-Onsen - Nakamiyori-Onsen - Kamimiyori-Shiobara-Onsenguchi - Ojika-Kōgen

Watarase Keikoku Railway

- Haramukō - Tsūdō - Ashio - Matō

=== Highway ===
- Tōhoku Expressway – Yaita IC, Yaita-Kita PA
- Nikkō Utsunomiya Road – Kiyotaki IC, Nikko IC, Imaichi IC, Dosawa IC, Osawa IC
- National Route 119
- National Route 120
- National Route 121
- National Route 122
- National Route 352
- National Route 400
- National Route 461

== Sports ==
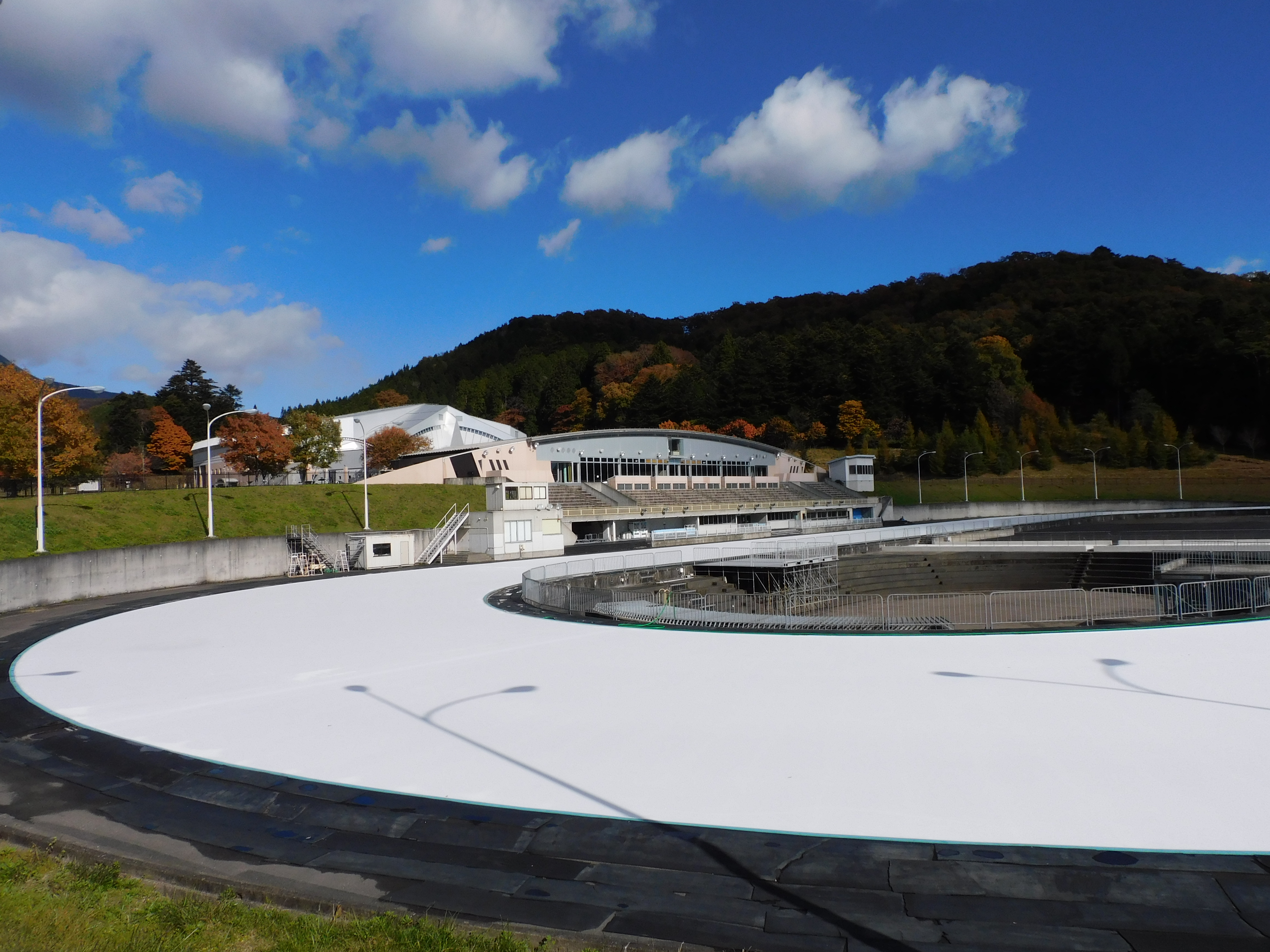
Nikkō Kirifuri skate center

Nikkō is the home city to the Nikkō Ice Bucks in the Asia League Ice Hockey. Nikkō Kirifuri Ice Arena hosted the Women's Ice Hockey World Championships (Division I) in April 2007.

There is also a speed skating oval.

== Education ==
Nikko has 23 public primary schools, 12 public middle schools and three combined public primary/middle schools operated by the city government. The city has three public high schools operated by the Tochigi Prefectural Board of Education. The prefecture also operates one special education school for the handicapped.

High schools:

- Tochigi Prefectural Nikko Meiho High School
- Tochigi Prefectural Imaichi High School
- Tochigi Prefectural Imaichi Technical High School

== Notable people ==
- Akio Fukuda, politician
- Tomikazu Fukuda, politician
- Masaru Ibuka, entrepreneur, co-founder of Sony
- Shoma Sato, professional baseball player

== Sister cities ==
- (Japan) Odawara, Kanagawa Prefecture, since December 19, 1980
- Rapid City, South Dakota, United States, sister city since February 7, 1993
- Tainan, Taiwan, friendship city since January 16, 2009
