= Okorogawa, Tochigi =

Dissolved municipality in Tochigi prefecture, Japan

Okorogawa (小来川村, Okorogawa-mura) was a village in Tochigi Prefecture, Japan. It traces its origins to the village of Itako, which was established by the merger of Okorogawa and neighboring Itaga in Kamitsuga District on April 1, 1889, when Japan adopted a new system of towns and villages. The two became separate on May 1, 1893. On February 11, 1954, Okorgawa merged with the neighboring town of Nikkō, forming the city of Nikkō. It remains part of the new city of Nikkō, which formed on March 20, 2006, with further mergers.
