= Aizukōgen-Ozeguchi Station =

Railway station in Minamiaizu, Fukushima Prefecture, Japan

Aizukōgen-Ozeguchi Station 会津高原尾瀬口駅
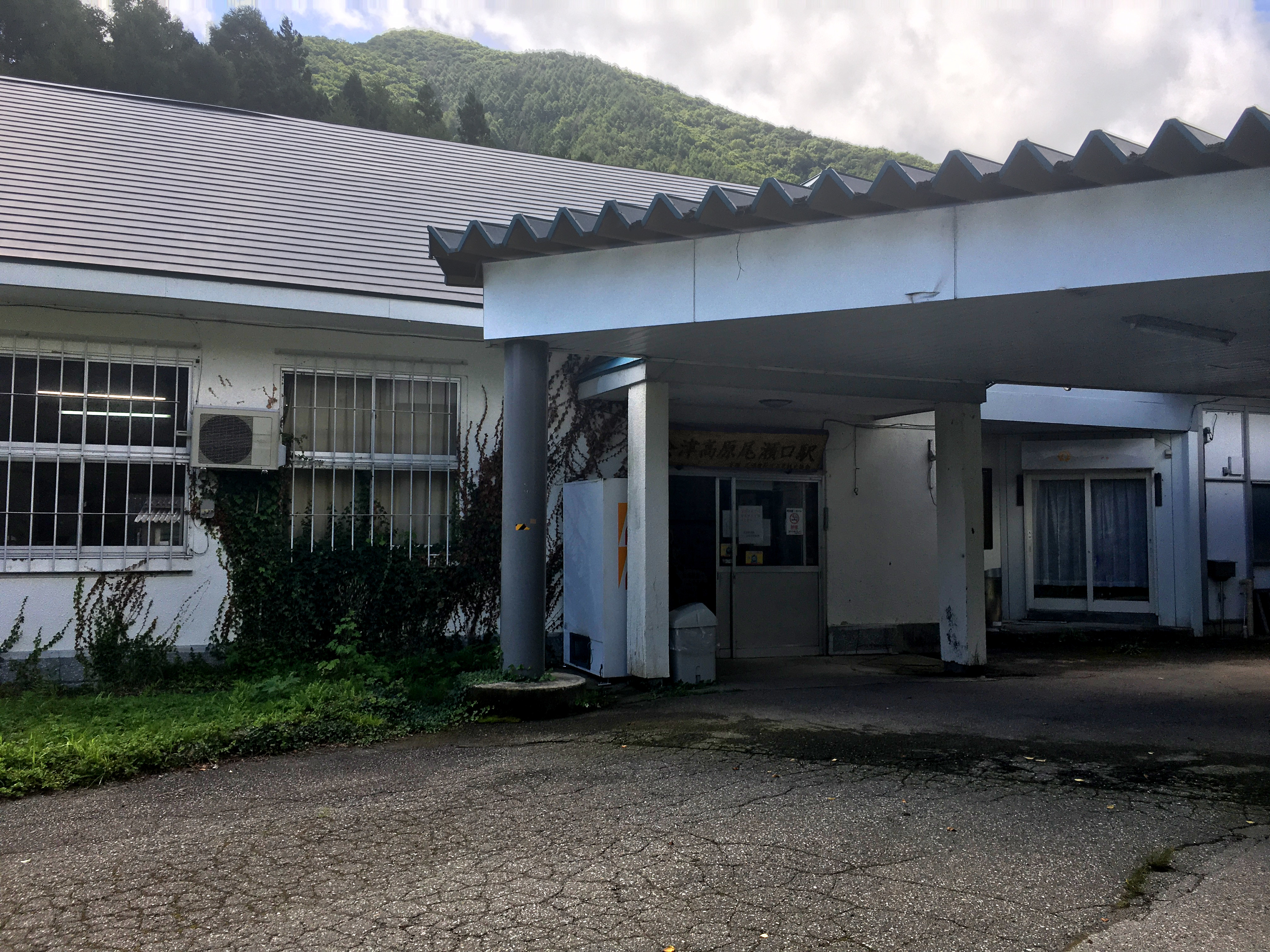
- Aizukōgen-Ozeguchi Station in August 2021

General information
- Location: Sorima-911 Takinohara, Minamiaizu-machi, Minamiaizu-gun, Fukushima-ken 967-0015; Japan
- Coordinates: 37.0900°N 139.7051°E
- Operator: Aizu Railway; Yagan Railway
- Lines: ■ Aizu Line; ■ Aizu Kinugawa Line
- Platforms: 1 side

Other information
- Website: Official website (Yagan Railway)

History
- Opened: November 8, 1953
- Former names: Aizu-Taki-no-hara (to 1986), Aizukōgen (to 2006)

Passengers
- FY2015: 224 daily (Yagan Railway); 36 daily (Aizu Railway)

Services
Preceding station	Yagan Railway	Following station
Kamimiyori-Shiobara-Onsenguchi towards Shin-Fujiwara	Aizu	through to Aizu Line
Ojika-Kōgen towards Shin-Fujiwara	Aizu Kinugawa Line	Terminus
Preceding station	Aizu Railway	Following station
through to Aizu Kinugawa Line	Aizu	Aizu-Tajima Terminus
Terminus	Aizu Line Local	Nanatsugatake-Tozanguchi towards Aizu-Wakamatsu
Location
- Location within Fukushima Prefecture Location within Japan

Aizukōgen-Ozeguchi Station (会津高原尾瀬口駅, Aizukōgen-Ozeguchi-eki) is a railway station in Minamiaizu, Minamiaizu District, Fukushima Prefecture, Japan, operated by the Aizu Railway.

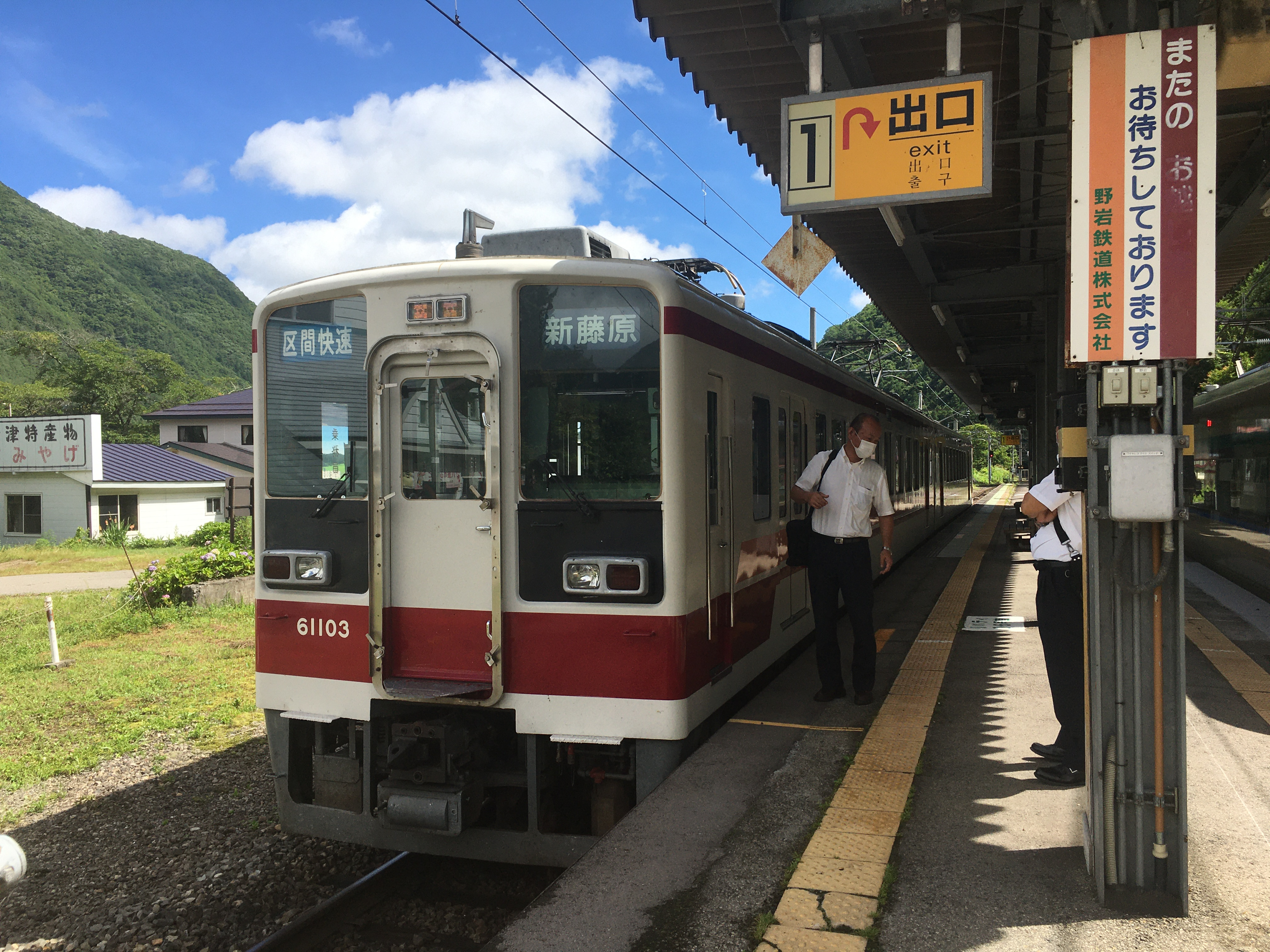
Platforms and train, 2021

== Lines ==
Aizukōgen-Ozeguchi Station is served by the Aizu Line, and is located 56.4 rail kilometers from the official starting point of the line at Nishi-Wakamatsu Station. It is also a terminus for the Yagan Railway Aizu Kinugawa Line and is located 30.7 rail kilometers from the opposing terminal at Shin-Fujiwara Station.

== Station layout ==
Aizukōgen-Ozeguchi Station has a single island platform connected to the station building by a level crossing.

== History ==
Aizukōgen-Ozeguchi Station opened on November 8, 1953, as Aizu-Takinohara Station (会津滝ノ原駅, Aizu-Takinohara-eki). The Yagen Railway connected to this station on May 1, 1966. The station name was changed Aizukōgen Station (会津高原駅, Aizukōgen eki) on October 9, 1986, and to its present name on March 18, 2006.

The platforms for the Aizu Line were transferred to the railway from JR East on 16 July 1987.

== Surrounding area ==
- National Route 352
- Arakai River
- Takihara Post Office

== Bus routes ==
- Aizu Bus
  - Aizukōgen-Ozeguchi Station - Yunohana Onsen - Tateiwa Tourist Information Desk (Note: Transfer onto ondemand bus bound for Tokusa Onsen) - Tokusa iriguchi - Uchikawa (Note: Transfer onto buses bound for Aizu-Tajima Station) - Hinoemata - Mike (Note: Transfer onto reservation bus bound for Okutadami Dam) - Oze Numayama Pass
    - Partly services which run during summer are express which passes bus stops between AizuKogen-Ozeguchi Station and Mori no Onsenkan Aruza, so when use the service passengers must pay additional fares at 300 yen.
