= Shin-Fujiwara Station =

Railway station in Nikko, Tochigi Prefecture, Japan

TN58 Shin-Fujiwara Station 新藤原駅
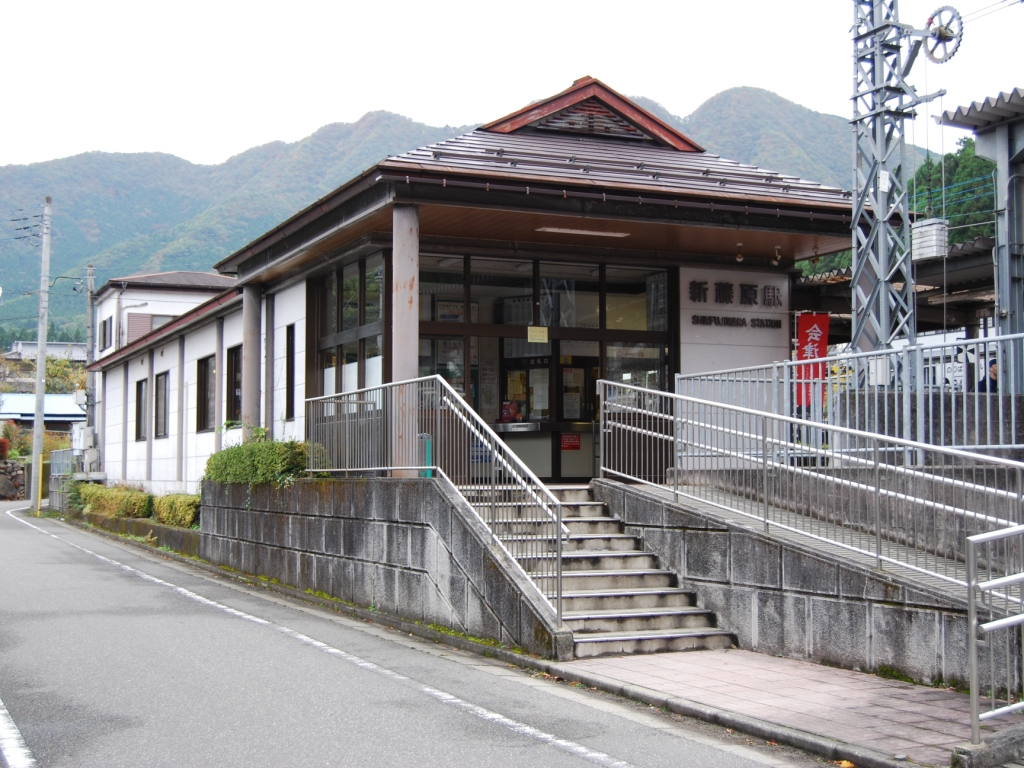
- Shin-Fujiwara Station in October 2008

General information
- Location: Fujiwara, Nikkō-shi, Tochigi-ken 399-28; Japan
- Coordinates: 36.8526°N 139.7328°E
- Operator: Tobu Railway; Yagan Railway
- Lines: Tobu Kinugawa Line; ■ Aizu Kinugawa Line
- Distance: 16.2 km from Shimo-Imaichi
- Platforms: 2 island platforms
- Tracks: 3

Other information
- Station code: TN-58

History
- Opened: 28 December 1919
- Electrified: 19 March 1922
- Former names: Fujiwara (until 1922)

Passengers
- FY2019: 726 daily (Tobu)

Services
Preceding station	Tobu Railway	Following station
Kinugawa-Kōen TN57 towards Asakusa	Aizu	through to Aizu Kinugawa Line
Kinugawa-Kōen TN57 towards Shimo-Imaichi	Kinugawa Line	Terminus
Preceding station	Yagan Railway	Following station
through to Kinugawa Line	Aizu	Ryūōkyō towards Aizukōgen-Ozeguchi
Terminus	Aizu Kinugawa Line	Ryūōkyō towards Aizukōgen-Ozeguchi
Location
- Location within Tochigi Prefecture Location within Japan

Shin-Fujiwara Station (新藤原駅, Shin-Fujiwara-eki; lit. "New Fujiwara Station") is a junction railway station in the city of Nikkō, Tochigi, Japan, jointly operated by the private railway operators Yagan Railway and Tobu Railway. The station is numbered "TN-58" in the Tobu Railway system.

== Lines ==
Shin-Fujiwara Station is a terminal station on the Tobu Kinugawa Line, and is located 16.2 km (10.1 mi) from the official starting point of the line at Shimo-Imaichi Station. It is also a terminus for the Yagan Railway Aizu Kinugawa Line and is located 30.7 km (19.1 mi) from the opposing terminal at Aizukōgen-Ozeguchi Station.

== Station layout ==
Shin-Fujiwara Station has two island platforms serving three tracks, connected to the station building by a level crossing.

=== Platforms ===
1	■ Tobu Kinugawa Line	for Shimo-Imaichi
2-4	■ Aizu Kinugawa Line	for Aizukōgen-Ozeguchi

== History ==
The station opened on 28 December 1919 as Fujiwara Station (藤原駅). It was renamed Shin-Fujiwara on 19 March 1922 at the same time the line was electrified.

From 17 March 2012, station numbering was introduced on all Tobu lines, with Shin-Fujiwara Station becoming "TN-57". It was renumbered "TN-58" on 21 April 2017 ahead of the opening of Tobu World Square Station (TN-55) in July 2017.

== Passenger statistics ==
In fiscal 2019, the Tobu portion of the station was used by an average of 726 passengers daily (boarding passengers only). The Yagen Railway portion of the station was used by 492 passengers daily in fiscal 2016.

== Surrounding area ==
- National Route 121
- Kinugawa River
- Yagan Railway head office

== See also ==
- List of railway stations in Japan
