= Kinugawa (disambiguation) =

Kinugawa may refer to one of the following.

- Kinugawa River, a river in Tochigi Prefecture, Japan
- Kinugawa (train), a train service in Japan
- Kinugawa Onsen, a hot spring area in Tochigi Prefecture, Japan
- Kinugawa-Onsen Station, a railway station in Tochigi Prefecture, Japan
- Kinugawa-Kōen Station, a railway station in Tochigi Prefecture, Japan
- Tōbu Kinugawa Line, a railway line in Japan
- Yagan Railway Aizu Kinugawa Line, a railway line in Japan
