= Ōkuwa Station (Tochigi) =

Railway station in Nikkō, Tochigi Prefecture, Japan

TN52 Ōkuwa Station 大桑駅
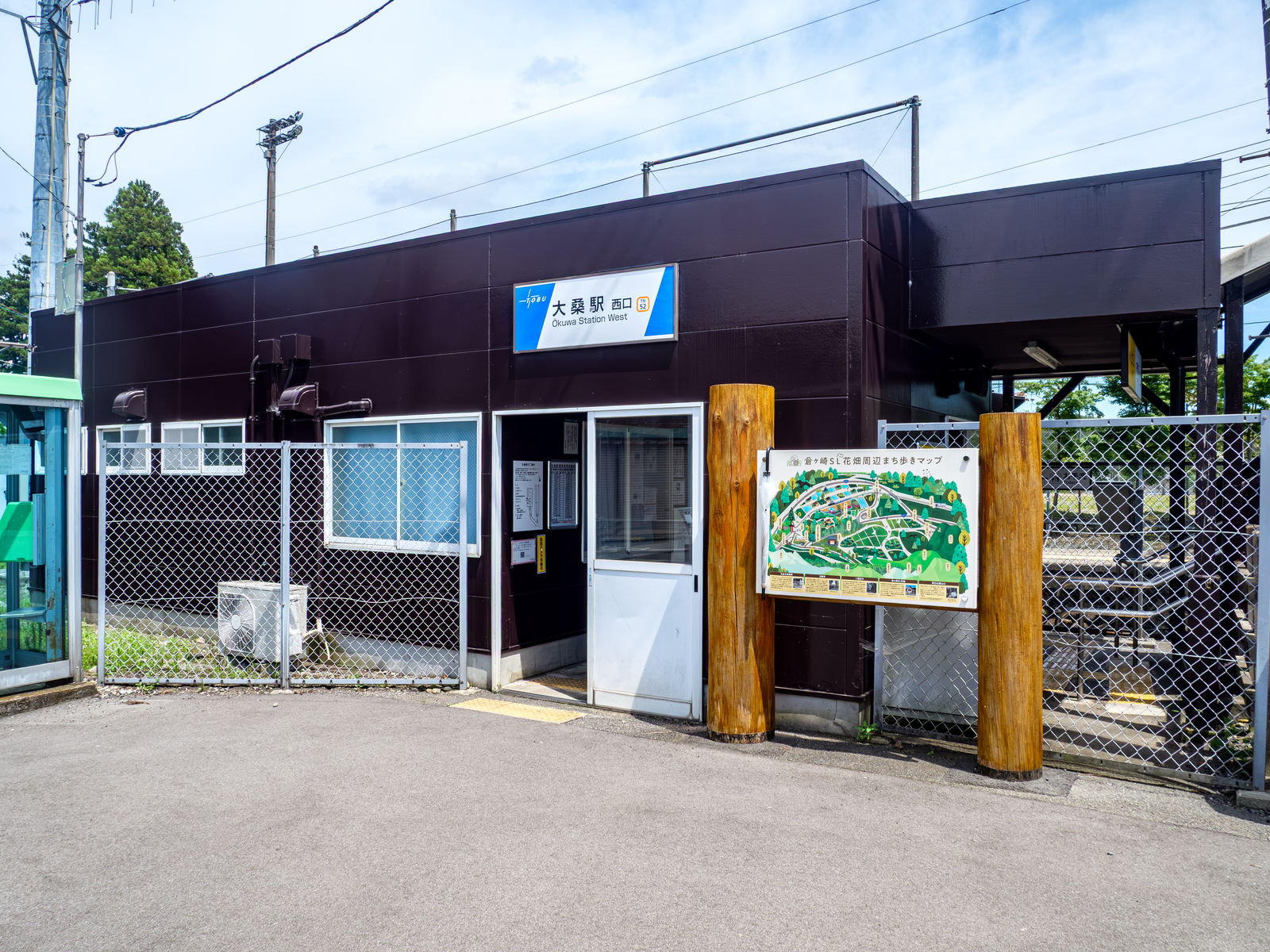
- Ōkuwa Station in July 2025

General information
- Location: 131 Ōkuwa, Nikkō-shi, Tochigi-ken 321-2411; Japan
- Coordinates: 36°45′38″N 139°42′48″E
- Operator: Tōbu Railway
- Line: Tōbu Kinugawa Line
- Distance: 4.8 km from Shimo-Imaichi
- Platforms: 1 island platform
- Tracks: 2

Other information
- Status: Unstaffed
- Station code: TN-52
- Website: Official website

History
- Opened: 2 January 1917

Passengers
- FY2019: 177 daily

Services
Preceding station	Tobu Railway	Following station
Daiya-Mukō TN51 towards Shimo-Imaichi	Kinugawa Line	Shin-Takatoku TN53 towards Shin-Fujiwara
Location
- Location within Tochigi Prefecture Location within Japan

Ōkuwa Station (大桑駅, Ōkuwa-eki) is a railway station in the city of Nikkō, Tochigi, Japan, operated by the private railway operator Tōbu Railway. The station is numbered "TN-52".

== Lines ==
Ōkuwa Station is served by the Tōbu Kinugawa Line, with direct services to and from Asakusa in Tokyo, and is 4.8 km from the starting point of the line at Shimo-Imaichi.

== Station layout ==
The station consists of an island platform serving tracks, connected to the station building by a footbridge.

=== Platforms ===
1	■ Tōbu Kinugawa Line	for Kinugawa-Onsen
2	■ Tōbu Kinugawa Line	for Shimo-Imaichi

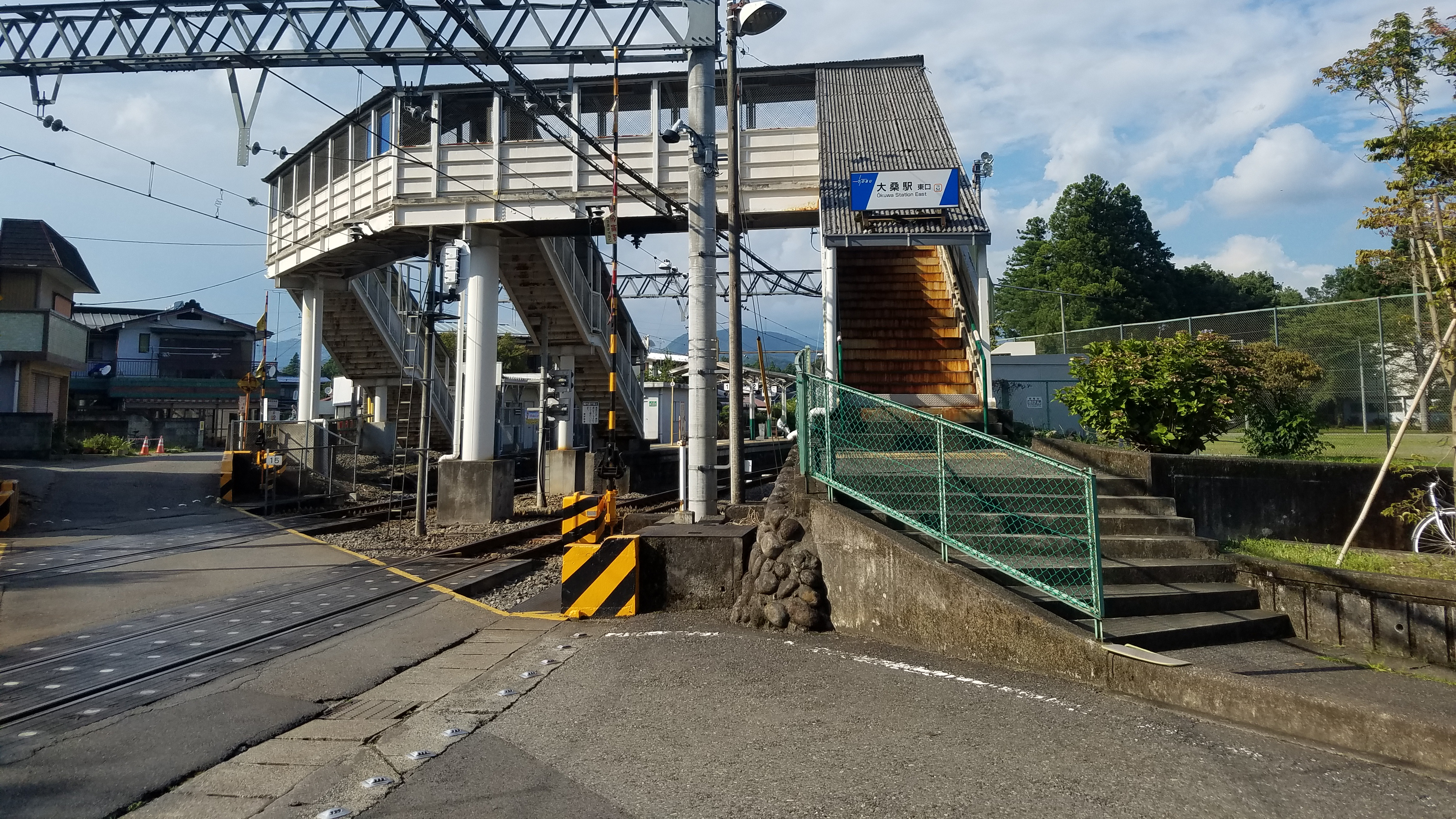
The entrance on the east side of the station in August 2021

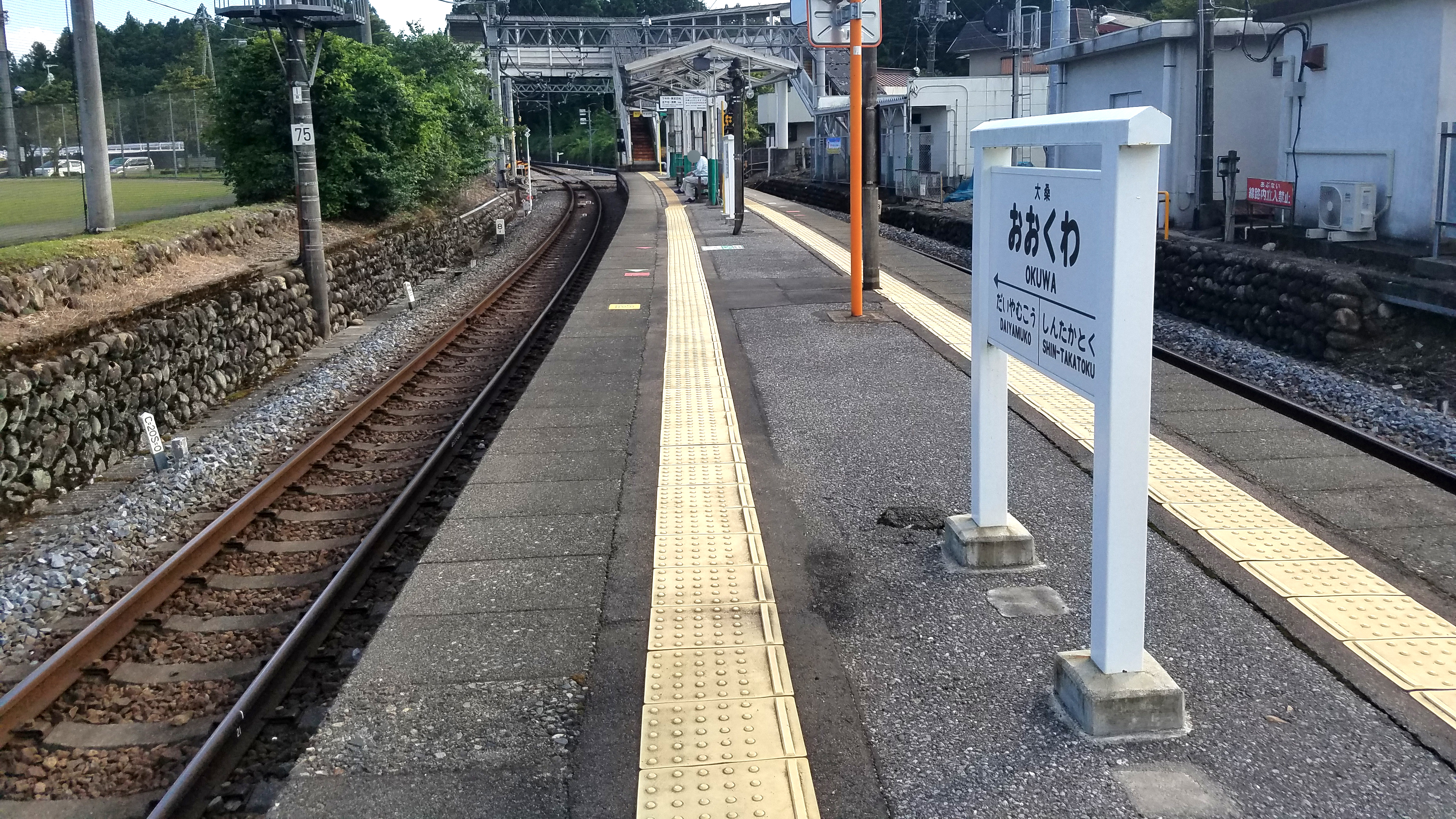
The platform in August 2021

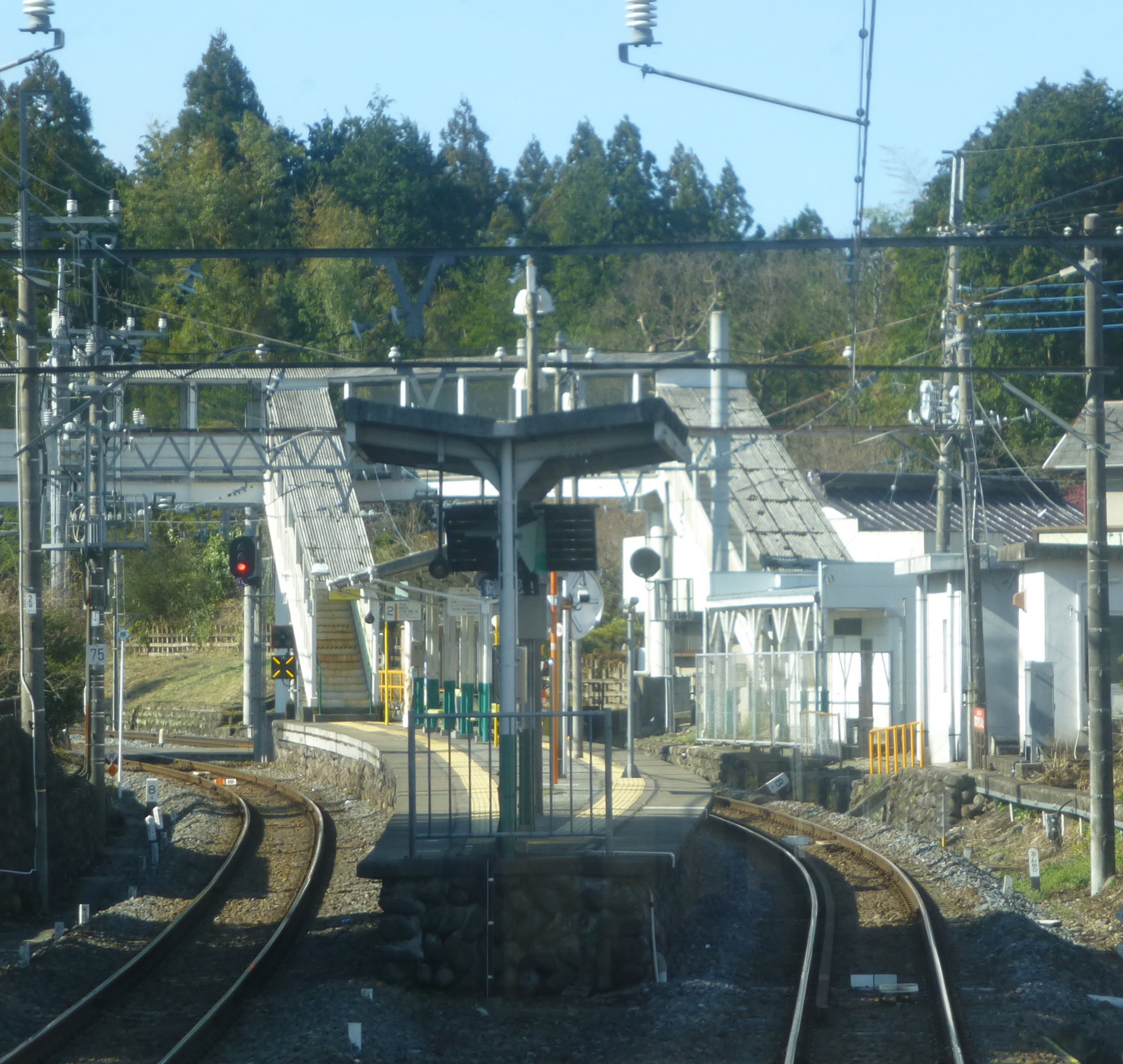
The station viewed from the north end in June 2014

== History ==
Ōkuwa Station opened on 2 January 1917. It was destaffed from 1 September 1983.

From 17 March 2012, station numbering was introduced on all Tōbu lines, with Ōkuwa Station becoming "TN-52.

The platform received protection by the national government as a Registered Tangible Cultural Property in 2017.

== Passenger statistics ==
In fiscal 2019, the station was used by an average of 177 passengers daily (boarding passengers only).

== Surrounding area ==
- Ōkuwa Post Office
- National Route 121

== See also ==
- List of railway stations in Japan
