= Kosagoe Station =

Railway station in Nikko, Tochigi Prefecture, Japan

TN54 Kosagoe Station 小佐越駅
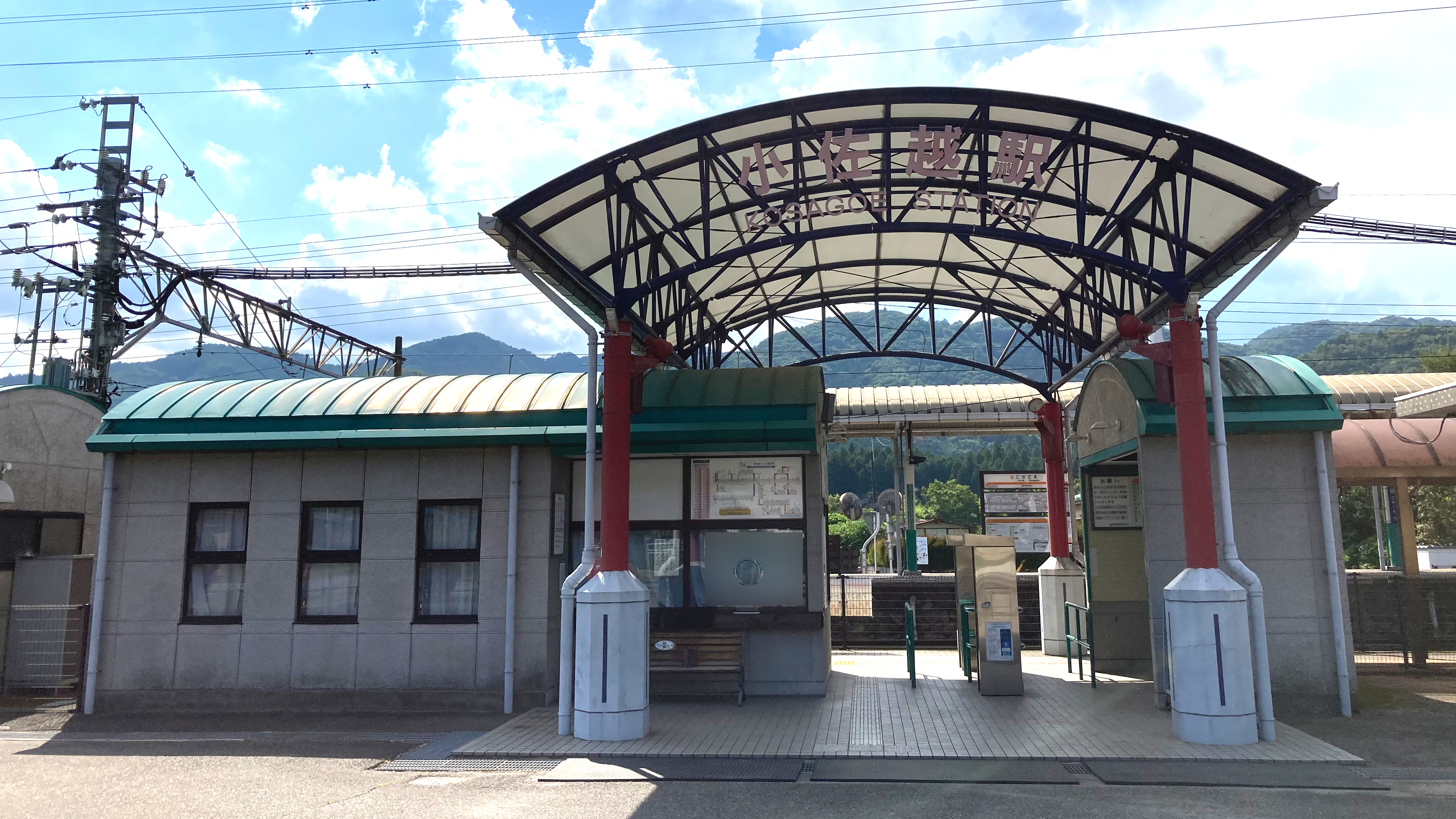
- Kosagoe Station in August 2021

General information
- Location: 29 Kinugawa-Onsen Ohara, Nikkō-shi, Tochigi-ken; Japan
- Coordinates: 36.8021°N 139.7064°E
- Operator: Tōbu Railway
- Line: Tōbu Kinugawa Line
- Distance: 9.9 km from Shimo-Imaichi
- Platforms: 1 island platform
- Tracks: 2

Other information
- Station code: TN-54
- Website: Official website

History
- Opened: 11 November 1924
- Former names: Kosagoemae (until 1930)

Passengers
- FY2019: 215 daily

Services
Preceding station	Tobu Railway	Following station
Shin-Takatoku TN53 towards Shimo-Imaichi	Kinugawa Line	Tobu World Square TN55 towards Shin-Fujiwara
Location
- Location within Tochigi Prefecture Location within Japan

Kosagoe Station (小佐越駅, Kosagoe-eki) is a railway station in the city of Nikkō, Tochigi, Japan, operated by the private railway operator Tōbu Railway. The station is numbered "TN-54".

== Lines ==
Kosagoe Station is served by the Tōbu Kinugawa Line, with direct services to and from Asakusa in Tokyo, and is 9.9 km from the starting point of the line at Shimo-Imaichi.

== Station layout ==
The station consists of one island platform connected to the station building by a footbridge.

=== Platforms ===
1	■ Tōbu Kinugawa Line	for Shimo-Imaichi
2	■ Tōbu Kinugawa Line	for Kinugawa-Onsen

== History ==
The station opened on 11 November 1924 as Kosagoemae Station (小佐越前駅). It was renamed Kosagoe on 6 July 1930.

From 17 March 2012, station numbering was introduced on all Tōbu lines, with Kosagoe Station becoming "TN-54".

The platform received protection by the national government as a Registered Tangible Cultural Property in 2017.

== Passenger statistics ==
In fiscal 2019, the station was used by an average of 215 passengers daily (boarding passengers only).

== Surrounding area ==
- Kinugawa River
- Kinugawa Onsen hot spring area
- Kawaji Onsen hot spring area
- Tobu World Square theme park

== See also ==
- List of railway stations in Japan
