= Kinugawa-Kōen Station =

Railway station in Nikko, Tochigi Prefecture, Japan

TN57 Kinugawa-Kōen Station 鬼怒川公園駅
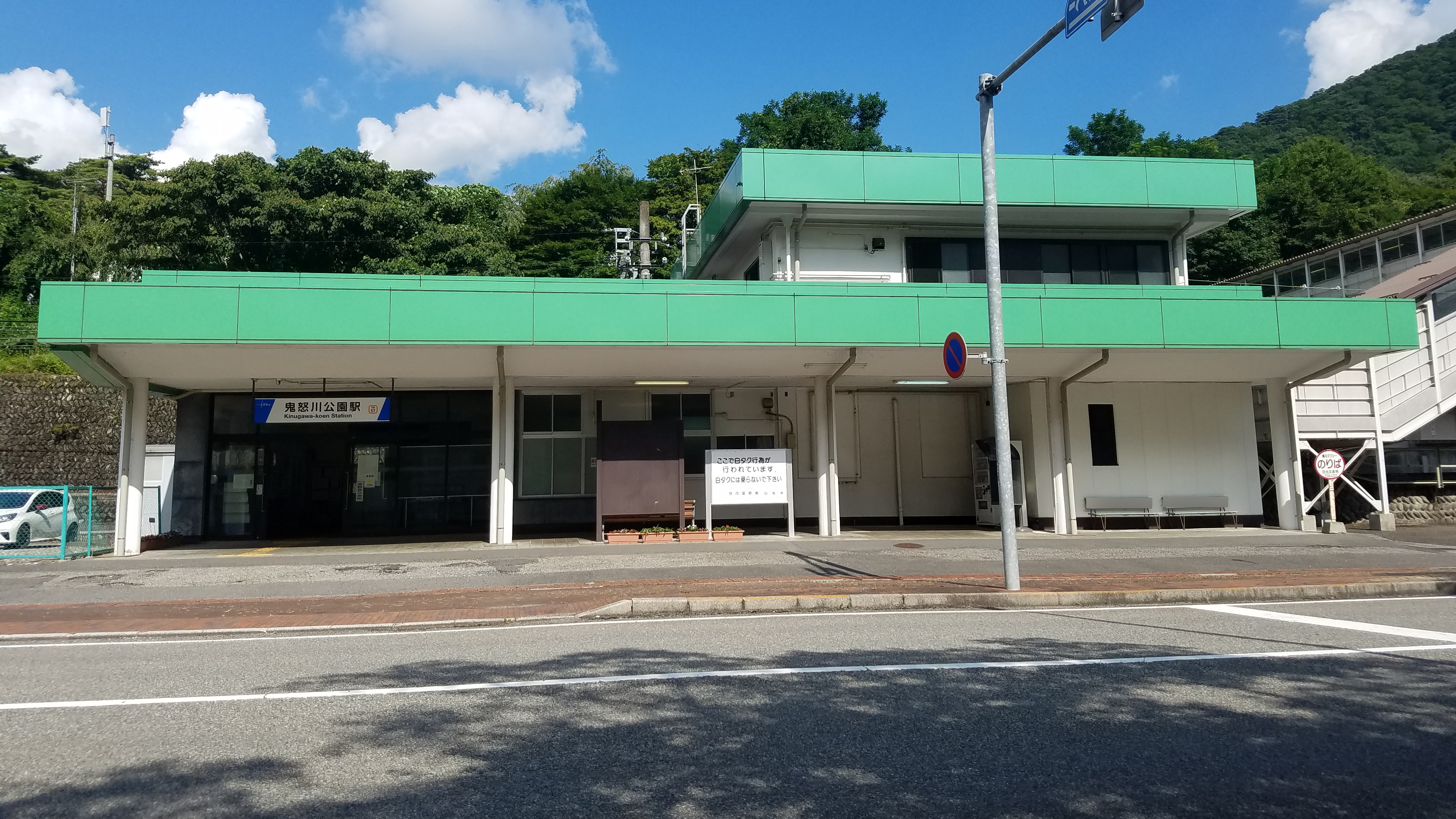
- Kinugawa-Kōen Station in August 2021

General information
- Location: 19 Fujiwara, Nikkō-shi, Tochigi-ken 321-2521; Japan
- Coordinates: 36.8409°N 139.7228°E
- Operator: Tobu Railway
- Line: Tobu Kinugawa Line
- Distance: 14.5 km from Shimo-Imaichi
- Platforms: 1 side platform + 1 island platform
- Tracks: 3

Other information
- Station code: TN-57
- Website: Official website

History
- Opened: May 1939
- Rebuilt: 2006

Passengers
- FY2019: 249 daily

Services
| Preceding station | Tobu Railway | Following station |
|---|---|---|
| Kinugawa-Onsen TN56 towards Asakusa | Aizu | Shin-Fujiwara TN58 Terminus |
| Kinugawa-Onsen TN56 towards Shimo-Imaichi | Kinugawa Line | Shin-Fujiwara TN58 Terminus |
Location
- Location within Tochigi Prefecture Location within Japan

Kinugawa-Kōen Station (鬼怒川公園駅, Kinugawa-Kōen-eki; lit. "Kinugawa Park Station") is a railway station in the city of Nikkō, Tochigi, Japan, operated by the private railway operator Tobu Railway. The station is numbered "TN-57".

== Lines ==
Kinugawa-Kōen Station is served by the Tobu Kinugawa Line, and is 14.5 km from the starting point of the line at Shimo-Imaichi.

== Station layout ==
The station consists of one side platform and one island platform, serving three tracks, connected to the station entrance by a footbridge.

=== Platforms ===
| 1 | ■ Tobu Kinugawa Line | for Shimo-Imaichi |
| 2 | ■ Tobu Kinugawa Line | for Shin-Fujiwara |
| 3 | ■ Tobu Kinugawa Line | for Shimo-Imaichi |

== History ==
Kinugawa-Kōen Station opened in May 1939. The station was closed from 25 October 1944 to 1 September 1950. It was closed again from 1 December 1961 to 10 December 1962.

A new station building was completed in 2006.

From 17 March 2012, station numbering was introduced on all Tobu lines, with Kinugawa-Kōen Station becoming "TN-56". It was renumbered "TN-57" on 21 April 2017 ahead of the opening of Tobu World Square Station (TN-55) in July 2017.

== Surrounding area ==
- National Route 121
- Kinugawa River
- Kinugawa Onsen
- Kinugawa Park
- Kinugawa Onsen Ropeway

== Passenger statistics ==
In fiscal 2019, the station was used by an average of 249 passengers daily (boarding passengers only).

== See also ==
- List of railway stations in Japan
