= Daiyamukō Station =

Railway station in Nikkō, Tochigi Prefecture, Japan

TN51 Daiyamukō Station 大谷向駅
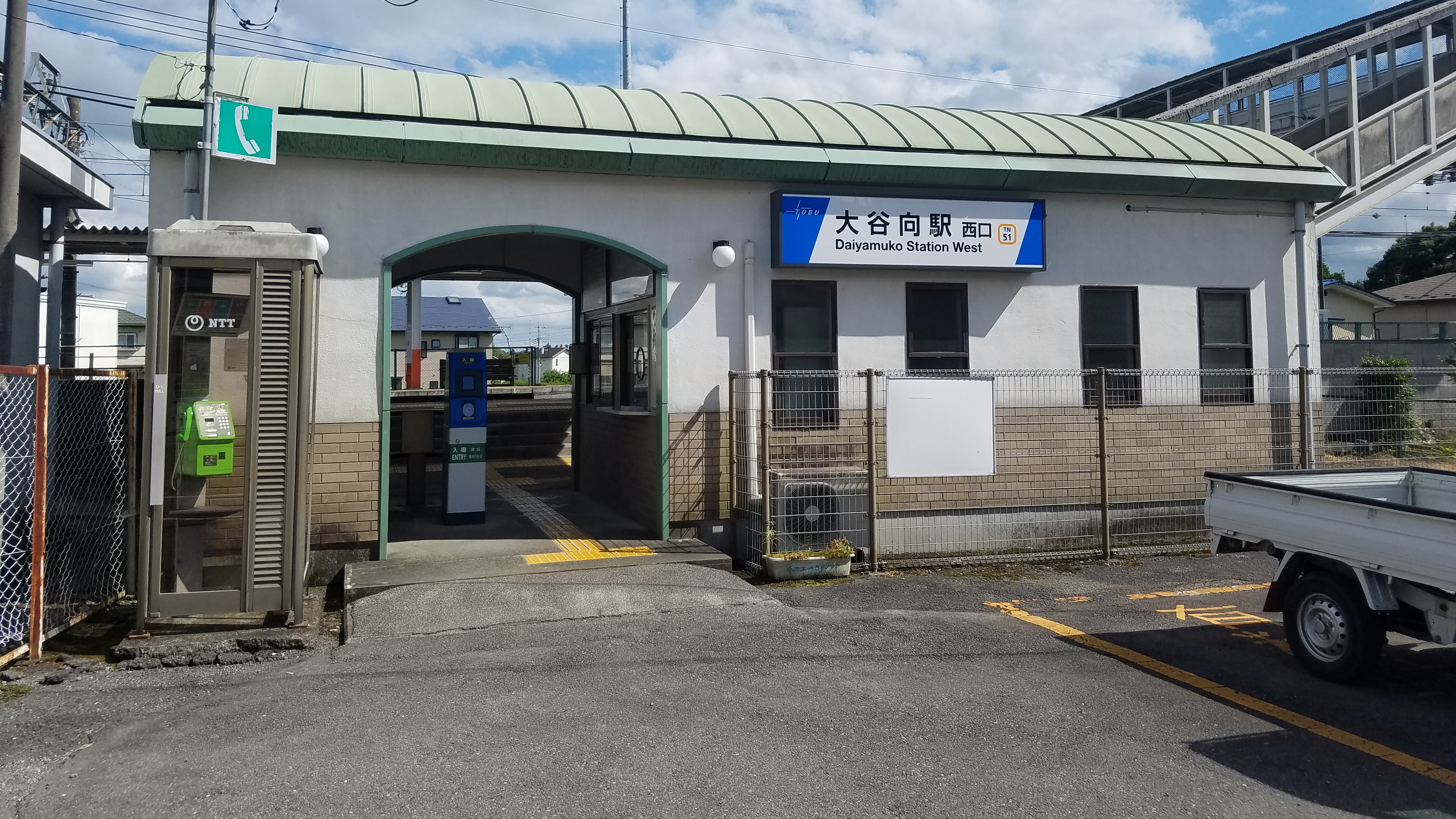
- Daiyamukō Station in August 2021

General information
- Location: 1406 Imaichi, Nikkō-shi, Tochigi-ken 321-1261; Japan
- Coordinates: 36.7321°N 139.6919°E
- Operator: Tōbu Railway
- Line: Tōbu Nikkō Line
- Distance: 0.8 km from Shimo-Imaichi
- Platforms: 2 side platforms

Other information
- Station code: TN-51
- Website: Official website

History
- Opened: 2 January 1917
- Former names: Daiyamukō-Imaichi (to 1919)

Passengers
- FY2020: 161 daily

Services
Preceding station	Tobu Railway	Following station
Shimo-Imaichi TN23 Terminus	Kinugawa Line	Ōkuwa TN52 towards Shin-Fujiwara
Location
- Location within Tochigi Prefecture Location within Japan

Daiyamukō Station (大谷向駅, Daiyamukō-eki) is a railway station in the city of Nikkō, Tochigi, Japan, operated by the private railway operator Tōbu Railway. The station is numbered "TN-51".

== Lines ==
Daiyamukō Station is served by the Tōbu Kinugawa Line, with direct services to and from Asakusa and Shinjuku in Tokyo, and is 0.8 km from the starting point of the line at Shimo-Imaichi.

== Station layout ==
The station consists of two opposed side platforms connected to the station building by a footbridge.

=== Platforms ===
1	■ Tōbu Kinugawa Line	for Kinugawa-Onsen
2	■ Tōbu Kinugawa Line	for Shimo-Imaichi

== History ==
The station opened on 2 January 1917 as Daiyamukō-Imaichi Station (大谷向今市駅). It was renamed Daiyamukō in 1919. The station was closed in November 1927, and reopened on 1 March 1931. It was destaffed from 1 September 1983.

From 17 March 2012, station numbering was introduced on all Tōbu lines, with Daiyamukō Station becoming "TN-51.

The platforms received protection by the national government as a Registered Tangible Cultural Properties in 2017.

== Passenger statistics ==
In fiscal 2019, the station was used by an average of 161 passengers daily (boarding passengers only).

== Surrounding area ==
- Imaichi Daiyamukō Post Office
- National Route 121
- National Route 461

== See also ==
- List of railway stations in Japan
