= Yaita Station =

Railway station in Yaita, Tochigi Prefecture, Japan

Yaita Station 矢板駅
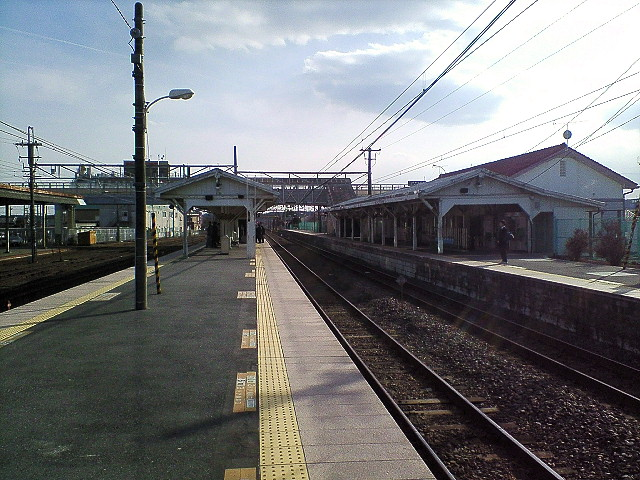
- Yaita Station, March 2007

General information
- Location: 1 Ōgi-chō, Yaita-shi, Tochigi-ken 329-2161; Japan
- Coordinates: 36.8069°N 139.9326°E
- Operator: JR East
- Line: Tōhoku Main Line
- Distance: 141.8 km from Tokyo
- Platforms: 2 island +1 side platforms
- Connections: Bus stop

Other information
- Status: Staffed (Midori no Madoguchi)
- Website: Official website

History
- Opened: 1 October 1886

Passengers
- FY2019: 2728 daily

Services
Preceding station	JR East	Following station
Kataoka towards Tokyo	Utsunomiya Line Local	Nozaki towards Kuroiso
Location
- Location within Tochigi Prefecture Location within Japan

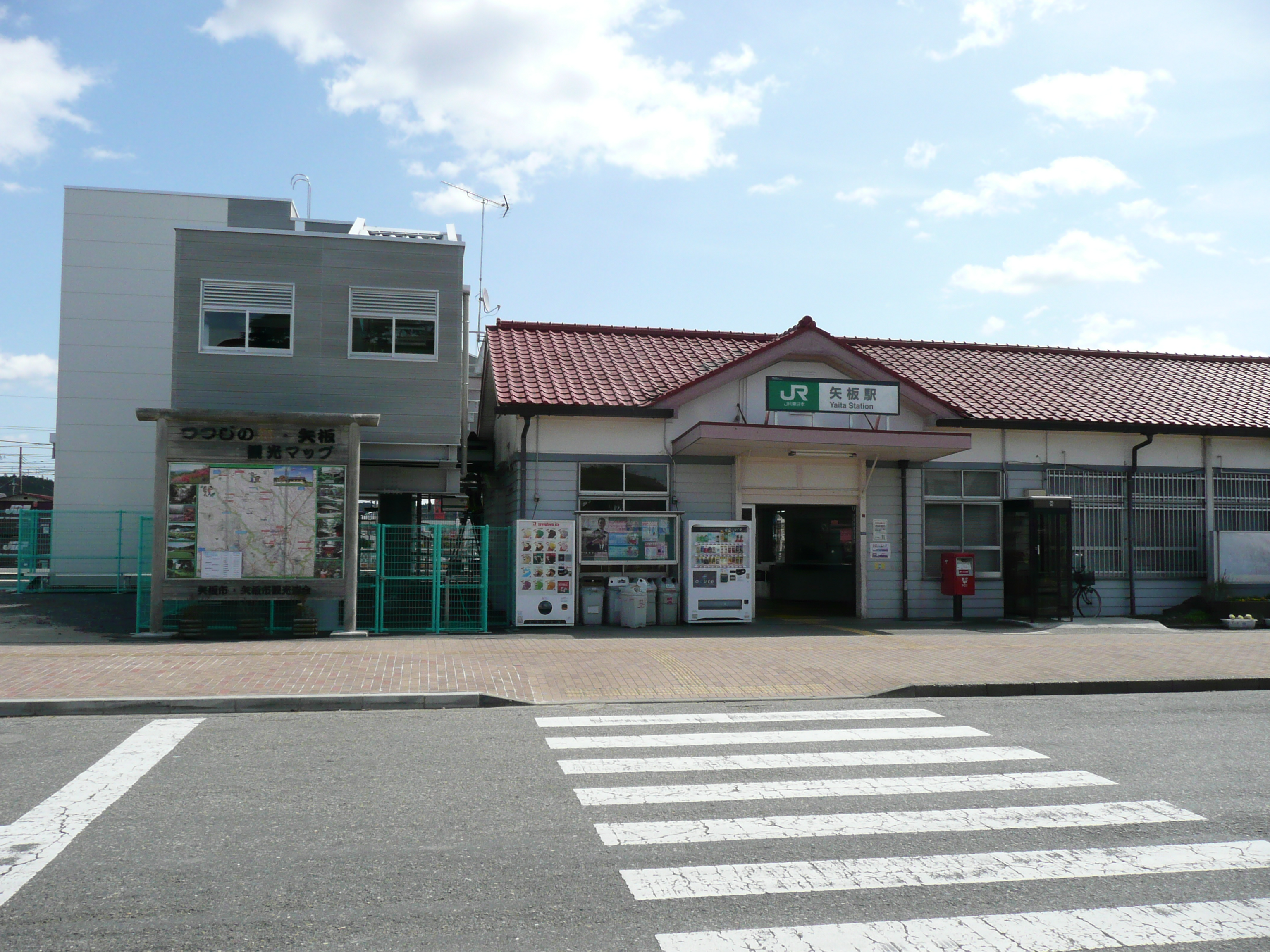
Yaita Station, March 2010

Yaita Station (矢板駅, Yaita-eki) is a railway station in the city of Yaita, Tochigi, Japan, operated by the East Japan Railway Company (JR East).

== Lines ==
Yaita Station is served by the Utsunomiya Line (Tohoku Main Line), and lies 141.8 km from the starting point of the line at Tokyo. The station was formerly also the terminus of the 23.5 km Tobu Yaita Line, which operated from Shin-Takatoku on the Tobu Kinugawa Line between 1 March 1924 and 30 June 1959.

The station was formerly also the terminus of the 23.5 km Tobu Yaita Line, which operated from Shin-Takatoku Station on the Tobu Kinugawa Linebetween 1 March 1924 and 30 June 1959.

== Station layout ==
This station has one island platform and one side platform connected to the station building by a footbridge. However, platform 2 is not in regular operation. The station has a Midori no Madoguchi staffed ticket office.

=== Platforms ===
1	■ Utsunomiya Line	for Nasushiobara and Kuroiso
3	■ Utsunomiya Line (Ueno-Tokyo Line)	for Utsunomiya, Ōmiya, Ueno, Tokyo, Yokohama, Atami (via Tokaido Line)

== History ==
Yaita Station opened on 1 October 1886. With the privatization of JNR on 1 April 1987, the station came under the control of JR East.

== Passenger statistics ==
In fiscal 2019, the station was used by an average of 2728 passengers daily (boarding passengers only).

== Surrounding area ==
- Yaita City Hall
- YaitaPost Office
- National Route 4

== See also ==
- List of railway stations in Japan
