= Shin-Takatoku Station =

Railway station in Nikkō, Tochigi Prefecture, Japan

TN53 Shin-Takatoku Station 新高徳駅
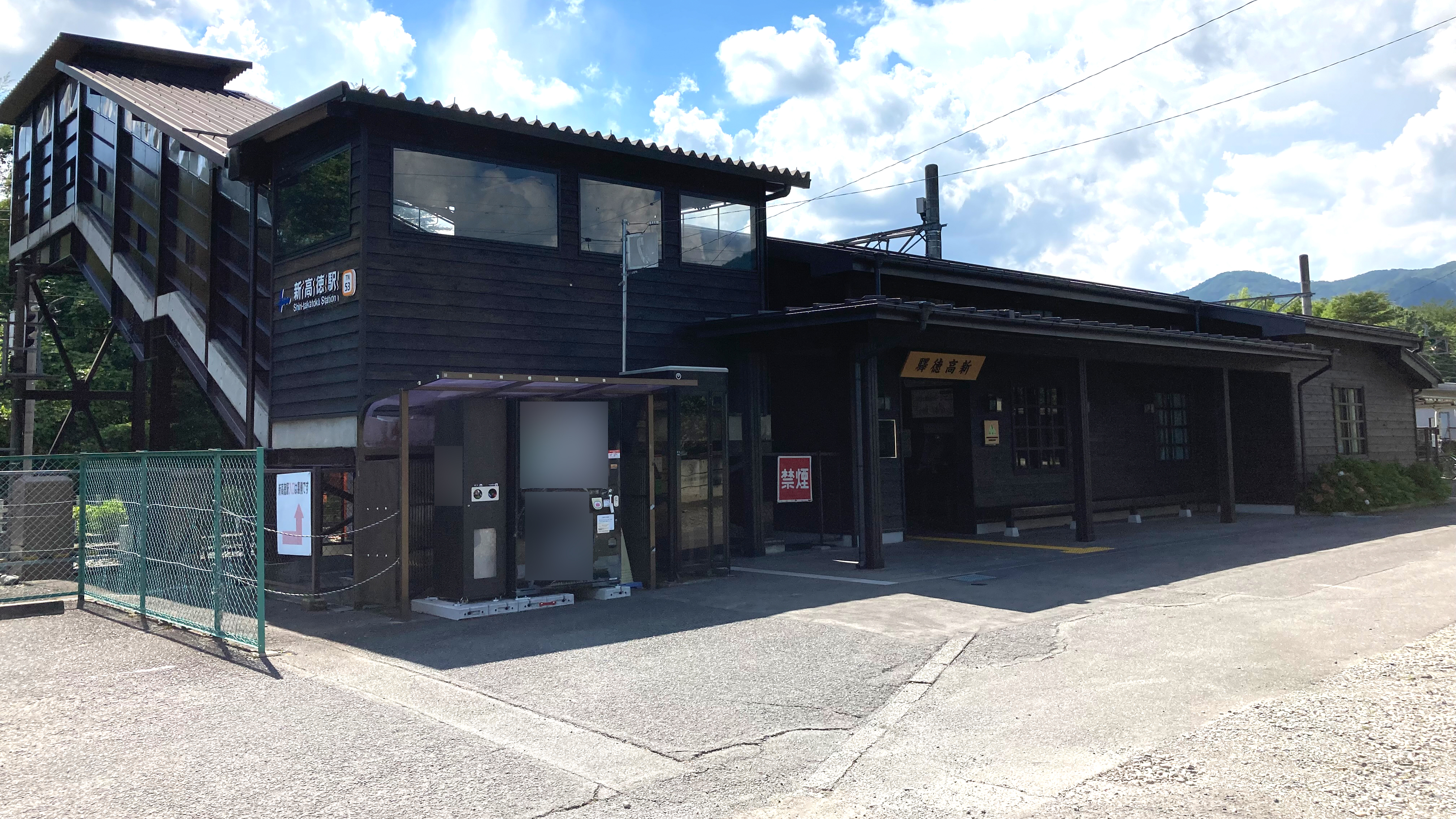
- Shin-Takatoku station building in August 2021

General information
- Location: 465 Takatoku, Nikkō-shi, Tochigi-ken 321-2523; Japan
- Coordinates: 36.7796°N 139.7107°E
- Operator: Tōbu Railway
- Line: Tōbu Nikkō Line
- Distance: 7.3 km from Shimo-Imaichi
- Platforms: 1 island platform

Other information
- Station code: TN-53
- Website: Official website

History
- Opened: 1 November 1917
- Former names: Takatoku (to October 1929)

Passengers
- FY2019: 335 daily

Services
Preceding station	Tobu Railway	Following station
Shimo-Imaichi TN23 towards Asakusa	Aizu	Tobu World Square TN55 towards Shin-Fujiwara
Ōkuwa TN52 towards Shimo-Imaichi	Kinugawa Line	Kosagoe TN54 towards Shin-Fujiwara
Location
- Location within Tochigi Prefecture Location within Japan

Shin-Takatoku Station (新高徳駅, Shin-Takatoku-eki; lit. "New-Takatoku Station") is a railway station in the city of Nikkō, Tochigi, Japan, operated by the private railway operator Tōbu Railway. The station is numbered "TN-53".

== Lines ==
Shin-Takatoku Station is served by the Tōbu Kinugawa Line, with direct services to and from Asakusa in Tokyo, and lies 7.3 km from the starting point of the line at Shimo-Imaichi.

The station was formerly also the terminus of the 23.5 km Tobu Yaita Line, which operated from Yaita on the Tohoku Main Line between 1 March 1924 and 30 June 1959.

== Station layout ==
The station consists of a single island platform serving two tracks, connected to the station building by a footbridge.

=== Platforms ===
1	■ Tōbu Kinugawa Line	for Shimo-Imaichi
2	■ Tōbu Kinugawa Line	for Kinugawa-Onsen

== History ==
The station opened on 1 November 1917 as Takatoku Station (高徳駅). It was renamed Shin-Takatoku on 22 October 1929.

From 17 March 2012, station numbering was introduced on Tōbu lines, with Shin-Takatoku Station becoming "TN-53".

The platform and passenger shelter on the platform received protection by the national government as a Registered Tangible Cultural Property in 2017.

== Passenger statistics ==
In fiscal 2019, the station was used by an average of 335 passengers daily (boarding passengers only).

== Surrounding area ==
- Kinugawa River
- National Route 121
- Fujiwara-Takatoku Post Office
