= Tobu World Square Station =

Railway station in Nikko, Tochigi Prefecture, Japan

TN55 Tobu World Square Station 東武ワールドスクウェア駅
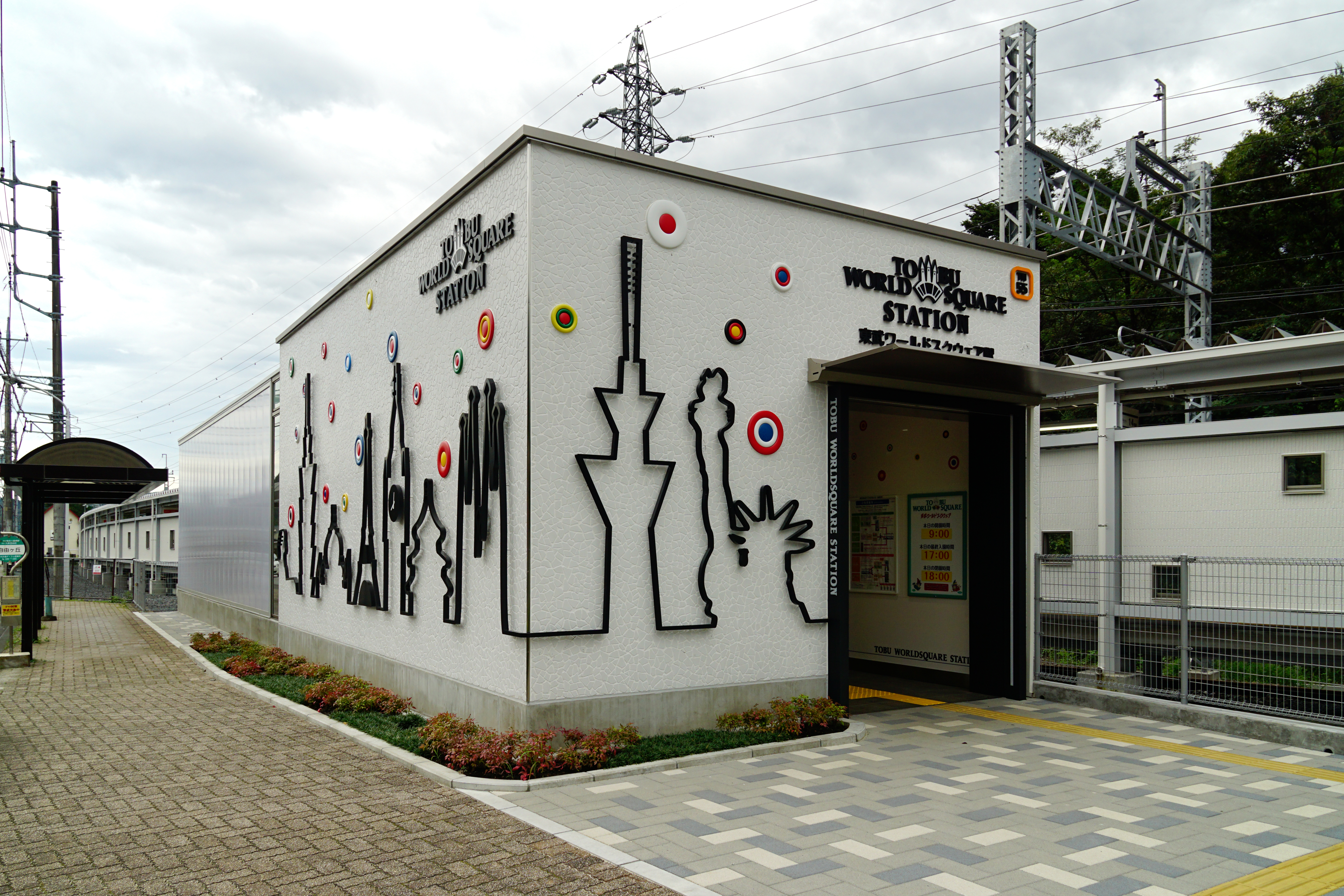
- The station entrance in August 2017

General information
- Location: 334-10 Kinugawa-Onsen Ohara, Nikkō-shi, Tochigi-ken 321–2522; Japan
- Coordinates: 36°48′30.8″N 139°42′33.1″E
- Operator: Tobu Railway
- Line: Tobu Kinugawa Line
- Distance: 10.6 km from Shimo-Imaichi
- Platforms: 1 side platform
- Tracks: 1

Construction
- Accessible: Access ramp

Other information
- Station code: TN-55
- Website: Official website

History
- Opened: 22 July 2017

Passengers
- FY2019: 298

Services
| Preceding station | Tobu Railway | Following station |
|---|---|---|
| Shimo-Imaichi TN23 towards Shinjuku | Kinugawa | Kinugawa–Onsen TN56 Terminus |
| Shimo-Imaichi TN23 towards Asakusa | Spacia X | Kinugawa–Onsen TN56 Terminus |
| Shimo-Imaichi TN23 towards Asakusa | Kinu | Kinugawa–Onsen TN56 Terminus |
| Shin-Takatoku TN53 towards Asakusa | Aizu | Kinugawa–Onsen TN56 towards Shin-Fujiwara |
| Shimo-Imaichi TN23 Terminus | SL Taiju | Kinugawa–Onsen TN56 Terminus |
| Kosagoe TN54 towards Shimo-Imaichi | Kinugawa Line | Kinugawa–Onsen TN56 towards Shin-Fujiwara |
Location
- Location within Tochigi Prefecture Location within Japan

Tobu World Square Station (東武ワールドスクウェア駅, Tōbu Wārudo Sukuwea-eki; officially stylized as TOBU WORLD SQUARE Station) is a railway station in the city of Nikkō, Tochigi, Japan, operated by the private railway operator Tobu Railway. It opened on 22 July 2017, and primarily serves the adjacent Tobu World Square theme park.

== Lines ==
Tobu World Square Station is served by the 16.2 km (10.1 mi) Tobu Kinugawa Line, with direct services to and from Asakusa and Shinjuku in Tokyo. Situated between Kosagoe and Kinugawa-onsen stations, it lies 10.6 km from the starting point of the line at Shimo-Imaichi.

== Station layout ==
The station has one side platform serving a single bidirectional track.

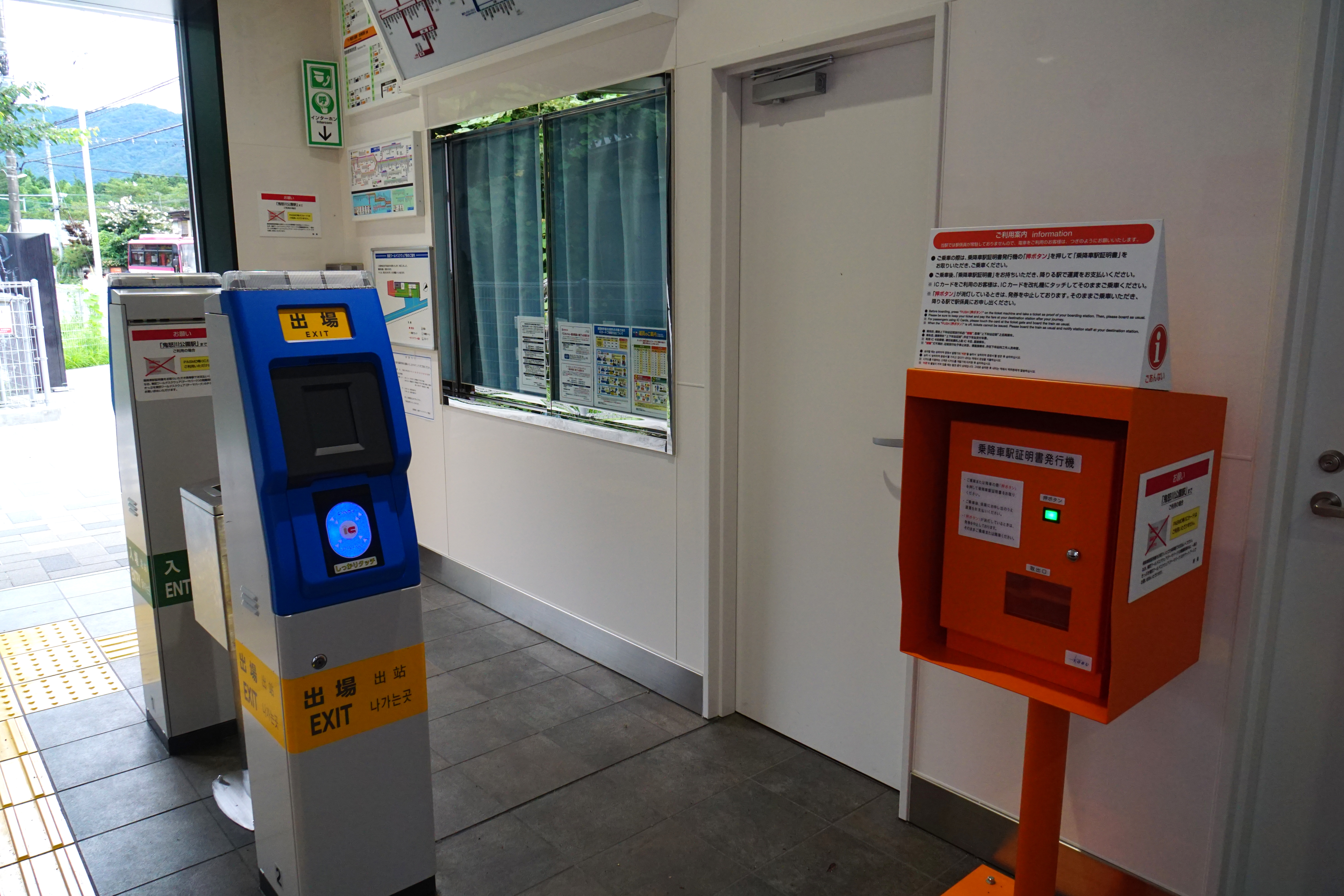
The station entrance in August 2017

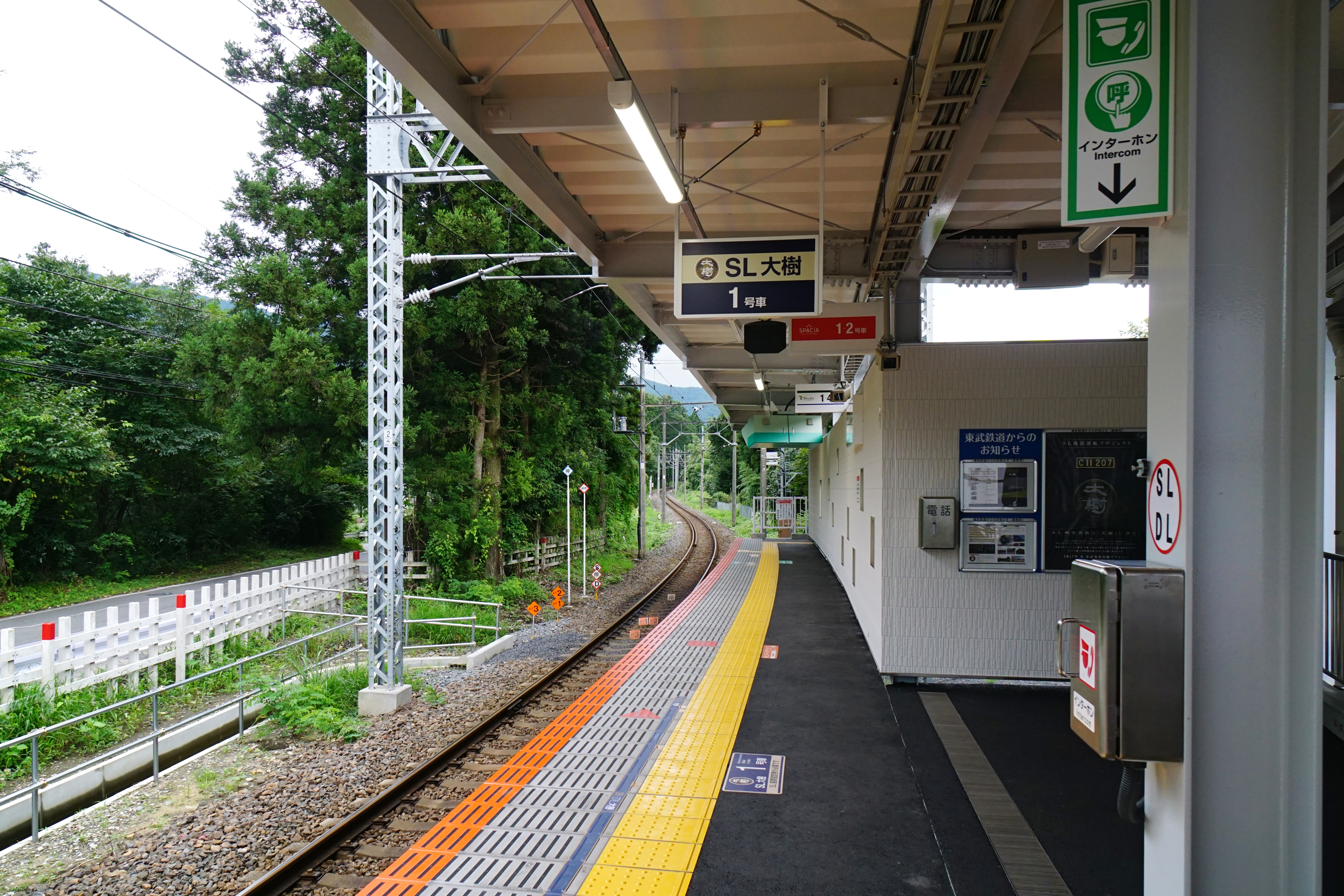
The station platform looking north in August 2017

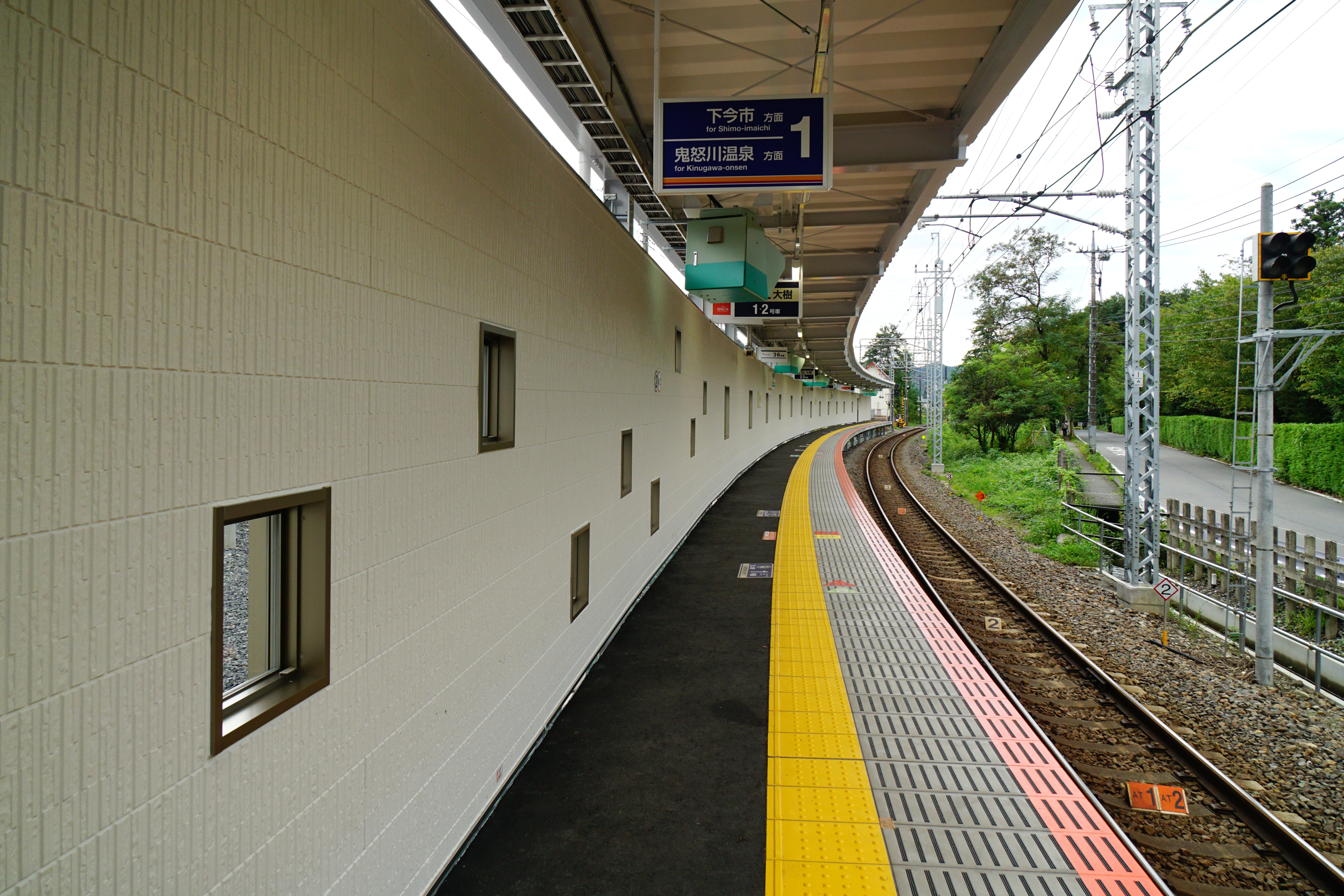
The station platform looking south in August 2017

== History ==
Initial details of the new station were formally announced on 25 November 2016.

== Passenger statistics ==
In fiscal 2019, the station was used by an average of 298 passengers daily (boarding passengers only).

== Surrounding area ==
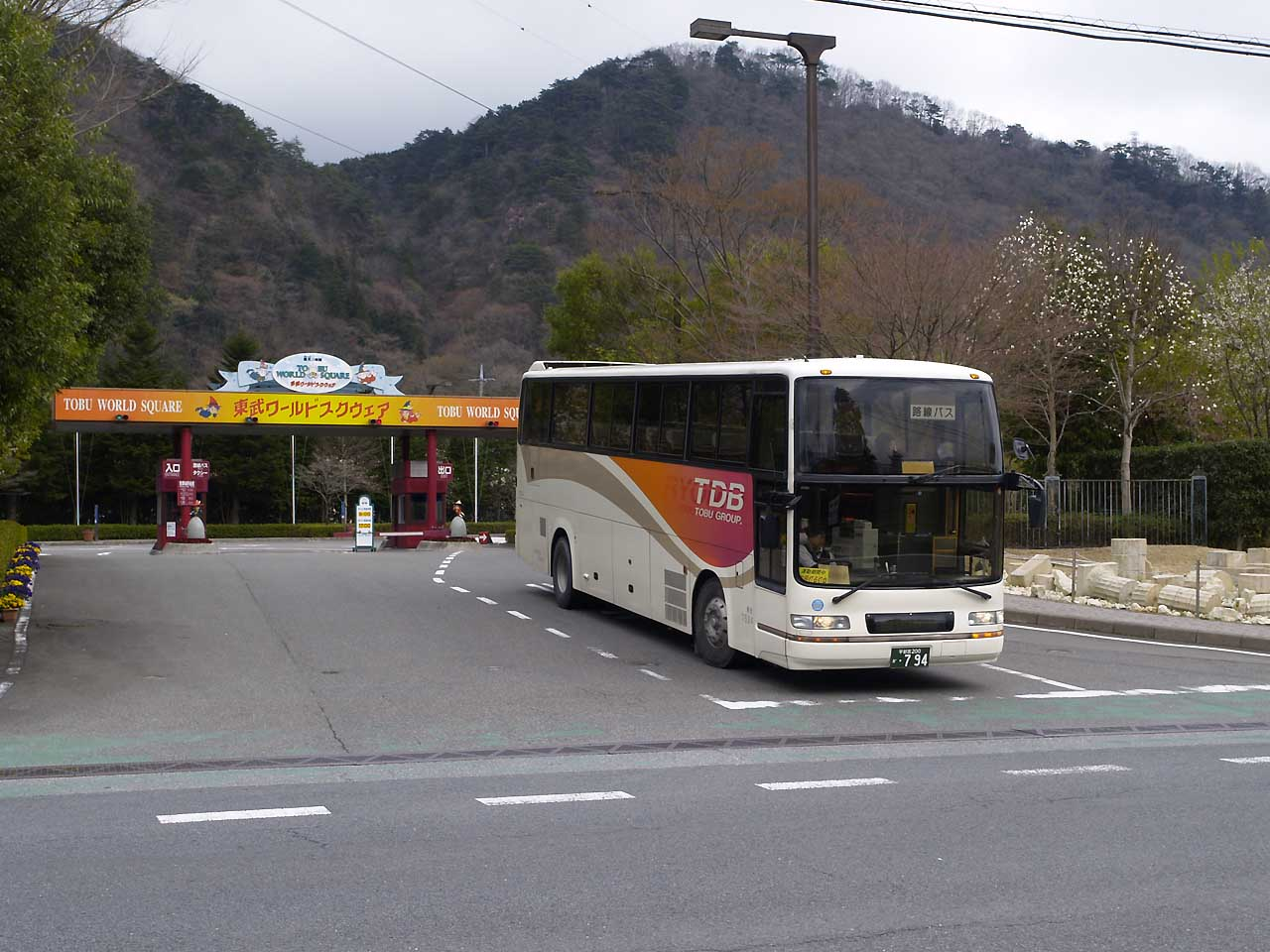
The entrance to Tobu World Square in 2010

- National Route 121
- Tobu World Square theme park, opened in April 1993
- Hotel Harvest Kinugawa
- Kinugawa River

== See also ==
- List of railway stations in Japan
