= Tōbu Yaita Line =

Heavy rail in Tochigi Prefecture, Japan

Overview
- Owner: Tobu Railway
- Locale: Tochigi Prefecture
- Termini: Shin-Takatoku; Yaita
- Stations: 9

Service
- Type: Heavy rail

History
- Opened: 1 March 1924
- Closed: 30 June 1959

Technical
- Line length: 23.5 km (14.6 mi)
- Track gauge: 1,067 mm (3 ft 6 in)
- Old gauge: 762 mm (2 ft 6 in)
Route map

The Tōbu Yaita Line (東武矢板線, Tōbu Yaita-sen) was a 23.5 km railway line in Japan operated by Tobu Railway, which connected Shin-Takatoku on the Tōbu Kinugawa Line to Yaita on the Tōhoku Main Line in Tochigi Prefecture. The line opened on 1 March 1924, and closed on 30 June 1959.

== Operations ==
In its final years, there were just five trains in each direction daily, with only three in each direction running over the entire length of the line. Trains were mixed passenger and freight services hauled by 4-4-0 steam locomotives built by Beyer, Peacock & Company in England, with passenger cars converted from former Tobu electric multiple units.

== Stations ==
All stations are located within Tochigi Prefecture.

Station		Distance (km)		Transfers	Location
Station		Between Stations	Total	Transfers	Location
Shin-Takatoku	新高徳駅	-	0.0	Kinugawa Line (TN53)	Fujihara, Shioya District (now Nikkō)
Nishi-Funyū	西船生駅	4.6	4.6		Shioya, Shioya District
Funyū	船生駅	3.2	7.8		Shioya, Shioya District
Tenchō	天頂駅	2.1	9.9		Shioya, Shioya District
Yoshiba	芦場駅	1.2	11.1		Shioya, Shioya District
Tamanyū	玉生駅	2.9	14.0		Shioya, Shioya District
Karahori	柄堀駅	3.0	17.0		Shioya, Shioya District
Kōoka	幸岡駅	3.5	20.5		Yaita
Yaita	矢板駅	3.0	23.5	■ Tōhoku Main Line ( Utsunomiya Line)	Yaita

== History ==
The line first opened on 1 March 1924 by the Shimotsuke Electric Railway (下野電気鉄道, Shimotsuke Denki Tetsudō), as a 762 mm (2 ft 6 in) narrow gauge branch line which extended 9.9 km from Takatoku Station (later Shin-Takatoku Station) to Tenchō Station (天頂駅). The line was re-gauged to 1,067 mm (3 ft 6 in) and extended from Tenchō to Yaita on the Tōhoku Main Line, with the 23.5 km line completed in October 1929.

On 1 May 1943, the line was bought by the Tobu Railway, becoming the Yaita Line.

The line closed on 30 June 1959.

== See also ==
- List of railway lines in Japan
