= Tobu Kinugawa Line =

Railway line in Nikko, Japan

Kinugawa Line

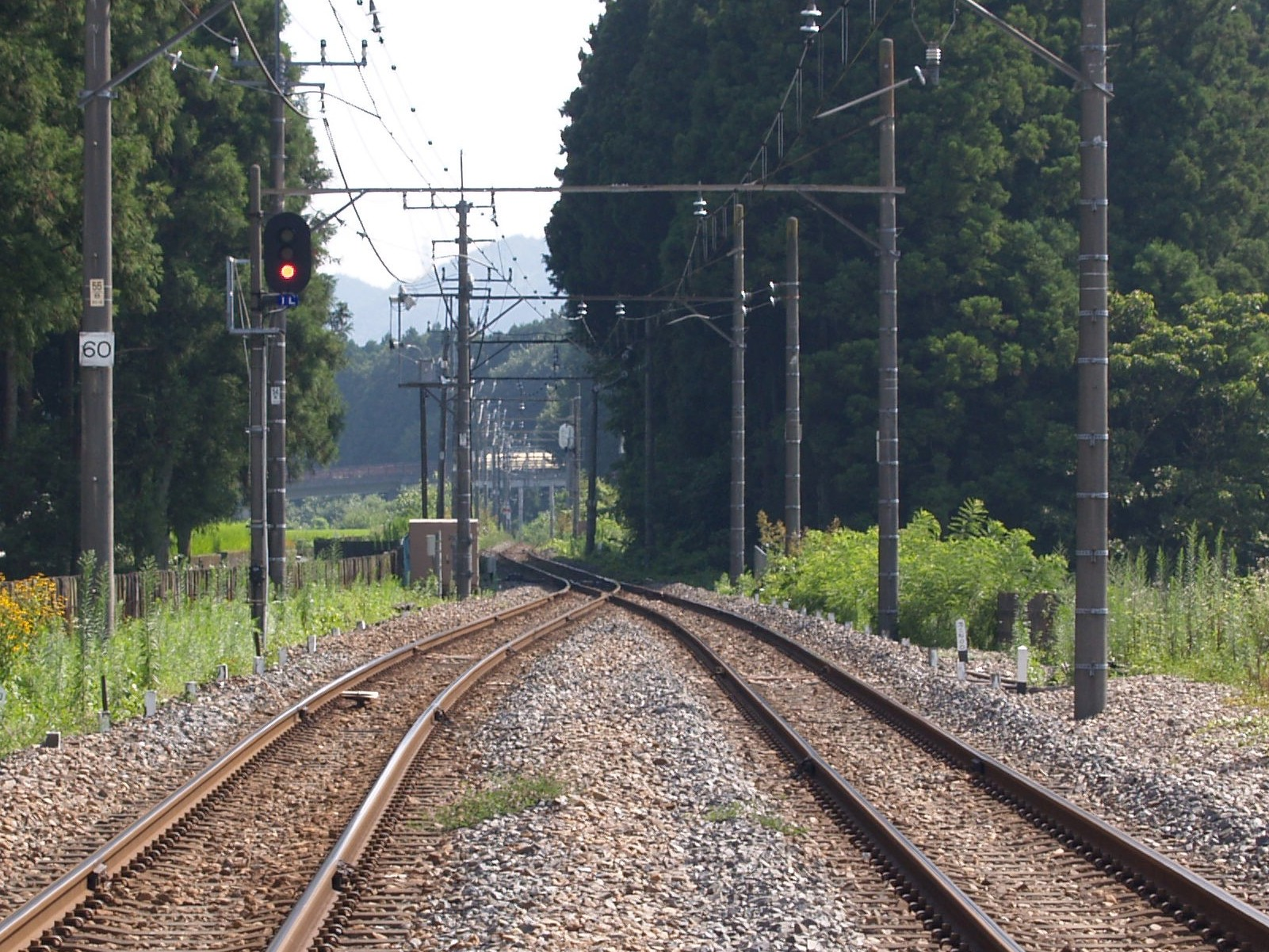

Overview
- Native name: 鬼怒川線
- Status: In service
- Owner: Tobu Railway Co., Ltd.
- Locale: Tochigi Prefecture
- Termini: Shimo-Imaichi; Shin-Fujiwara
- Stations: 9

Service
- Type: Heavy rail
- System: Tobu Railway
- Route number: TN
- Operator(s): Tobu Railway Co., Ltd.

History
- Opened: 2 January 1917; 109 years ago

Technical
- Line length: 16.2 km (10.1 mi)
- Track gauge: 1,067 mm (3 ft 6 in)
- Electrification: 1,500 V DC, overhead catenary

The Kinugawa Line (鬼怒川線, Kinugawa-sen) is a 16.2 km (10.1 mi) long Japanese railway line from Shimo-Imaichi Station to Shin-Fujiwara Station in Nikkō, Tochigi. It is owned and operated by the private railway operator Tobu Railway.

At Shimo-Imaichi Station it connects with the Nikko Line. At Shin-Fujiwara Station it connects with the Yagan Railway Aizu Kinugawa Line. Some trains go beyond the Aizu Kinugawa Line terminus at Aizu-Kōgen Oze-guchi Station onto the Aizu Railway Aizu Line.

The line runs surcharged, reserved-seat limited express services from and to Asakusa and Shinjuku in Tokyo.

The whole line is electrified at 1,500 V DC, but it is single tracked except for a 0.8 km (0.50 mi) double-tracked section at Kinugawa-Onsen Station.

== Stations ==
All stations are located within Nikkō, Tochigi.

No.	Station	Japanese	Distance (km)		SPACIA	JR	Revaty Aizu	Revaty Kinu	SL&DL Taiju	Ozatoro Tenbō Ressha YUMEGURI	Transfers
No.	Station	Japanese	Between stations	Total	SPACIA	JR	Revaty Aizu	Revaty Kinu	SL&DL Taiju	Ozatoro Tenbō Ressha YUMEGURI	Transfers
TN23	Shimo-Imaichi	下今市	-	0.0	●	●	●	●	●		Nikkō Line (TN23)
TN51	Daiya-Mukō	大谷向	0.8	0.8	↕	↕	◆	↕	↕		
TN52	Ōkuwa	大桑	4.0	4.8	↕	↕	◆	▲	↕		
TN53	Shin-Takatoku	新高徳	2.5	7.3	△	↕	●	▲	↕		(Yaita Line - closed 1959)
TN54	Kosagoe	小佐越	2.6	9.9	↕	↕	◆	▲	↕		
TN55	Tobu World Square	東武ワールドスクウェア	0.7	10.6	●	●	●	▲	↕		
TN56	Kinugawa-Onsen	鬼怒川温泉	1.8	12.4	●	●	●	●	●	●	
TN57	Kinugawa-Kōen	鬼怒川公園	2.1	14.5	△		●			↓	
TN58	Shin-Fujiwara	新藤原	1.7	16.2	△		●			●	■ Aizu Kinugawa Line

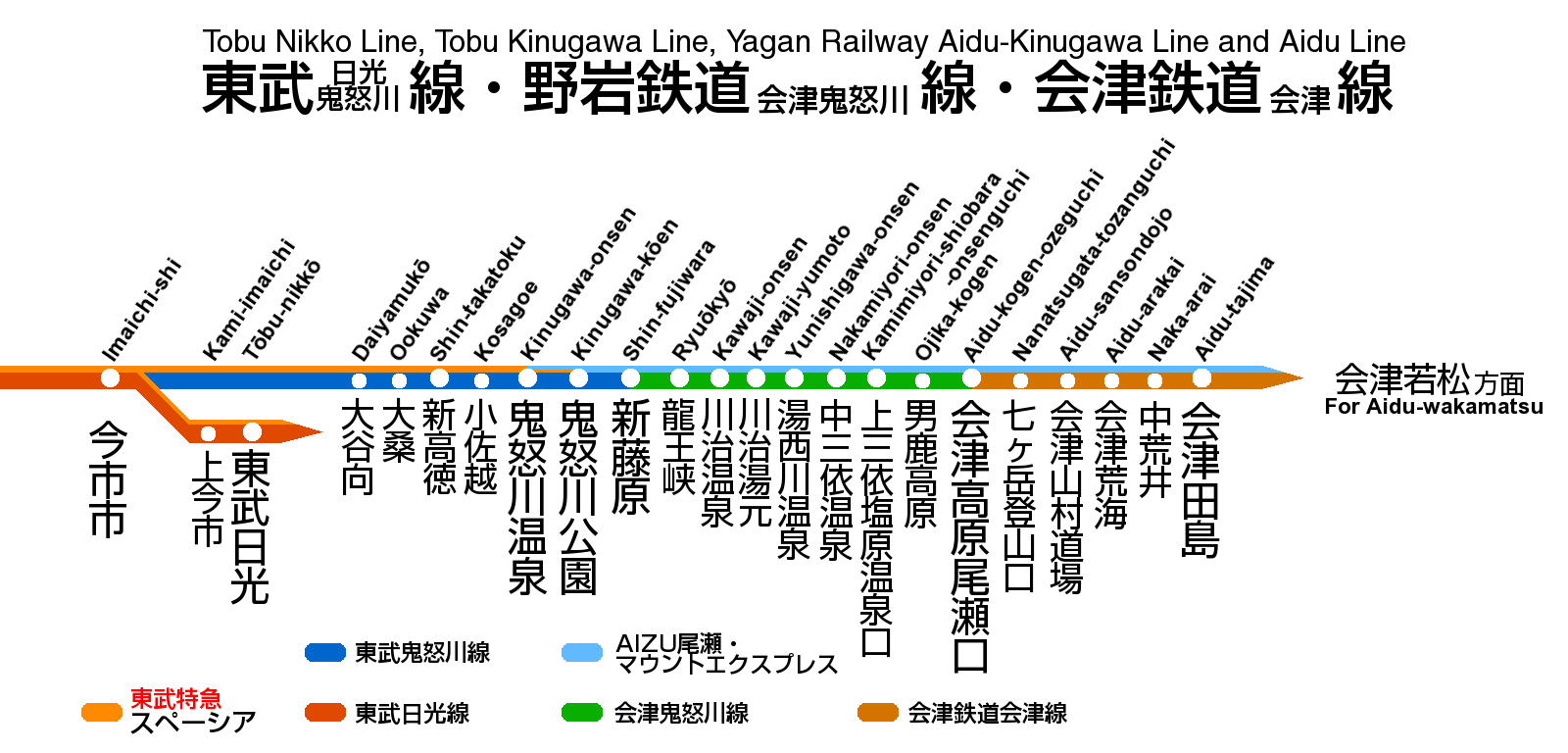
Route map of the Kinugawa Line

== History ==
- 1915: Fujiwara Tramway (藤原軌道株式会社, Fujiwara Kidō Kabushiki-gaisha) was licensed to build a 762 mm (2 ft 6 in) gauge steam-hauled tramway. It was renamed Shimotsuke Tramway (下野軌道株式会社, Shimotsuke Kidō Kabushiki-gaisha) in the same year.
- 2 January 1917: A 3.6-mile (5.8 km) section from Daiya-gawa Hokugan Station to Kinugawa Nangan Station was opened. The line was extended a further 2.5 miles (4.0 km) the same year.
- March 1919: Ōhara Station to Shimotaki Station section was opened.
- October 1919: Daiya Mukō Imaichi Station to Shin-Imaichi Station section was opened.
- 1 January 1920: Shimotaki Station to Fujiwara Station section was open to complete the whole 10.9-mile (17.5 km) line.
- 6 June 1921: The company name was renamed Shimotsuke Electric Railway Co., Ltd. (下野電気鉄道株式会社, Shimotsuke Denki Tetsudō Kabushiki-gaisha).
- 9 March 1922: The whole line was electrified at 600 V DC.
- April 1927: The corporate headquarters was relocated to the Tobu Railway headquarters in Tokyo.
- 22 October 1929: 1,067 mm (3 ft 6 in) gauge operation began on all the line.
- 1931: The voltage was raised to 1,500 V.
- 1 May 1943: Shimotsuke Electric Railway was bought out by Tobu Railway. The line became Tobu Kinugawa Line.
- 9 October 1986: Yagan Railway Aizu Kinugawa Line through service began.
- 12 October 1990: Aizu Railway Aizu Line through service to Aizu Tajima Station began.
- 18 March 2006: New Kinugawa services to/from Shinjuku commence.

From 17 March 2012, station numbering was introduced on all Tobu lines, with Tobu Kinugawa Line stations adopting the prefix "TN" in orange.

A new station, called Tobu World Square Station, opened between Kosagoe and Kinugawa-Onsen on 22 July 2017 to serve the nearby Tobu World Square theme park. From this date, Tobu World Square Station was numbered "TN-55", and the station numbers for Kinugawa-Onsen to Shin-Fujiwara were adjusted on 21 April 2017, ahead of the opening.

== Future developments ==
=== Steam-hauled services ===
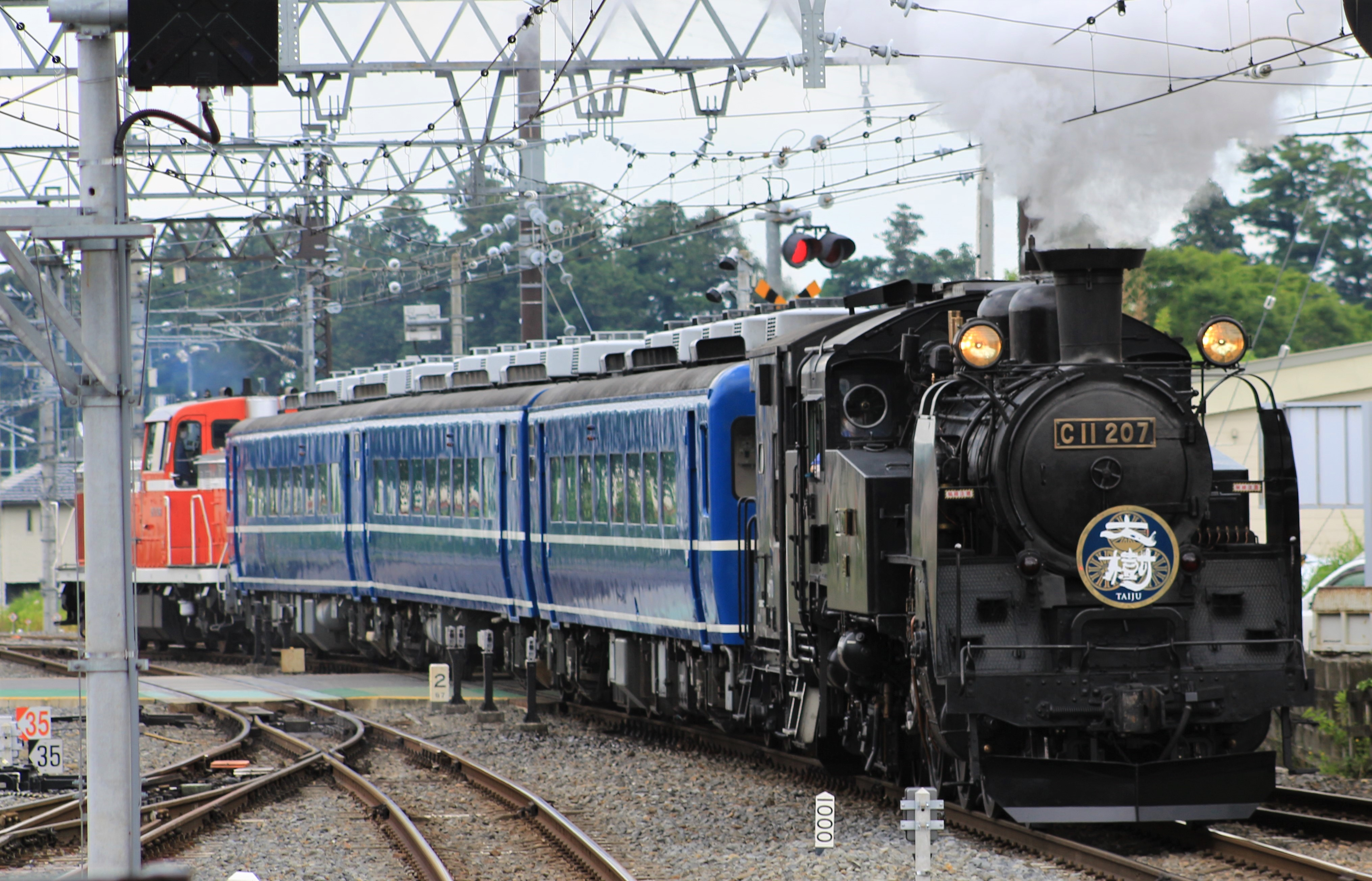
C11 207 in June 2020

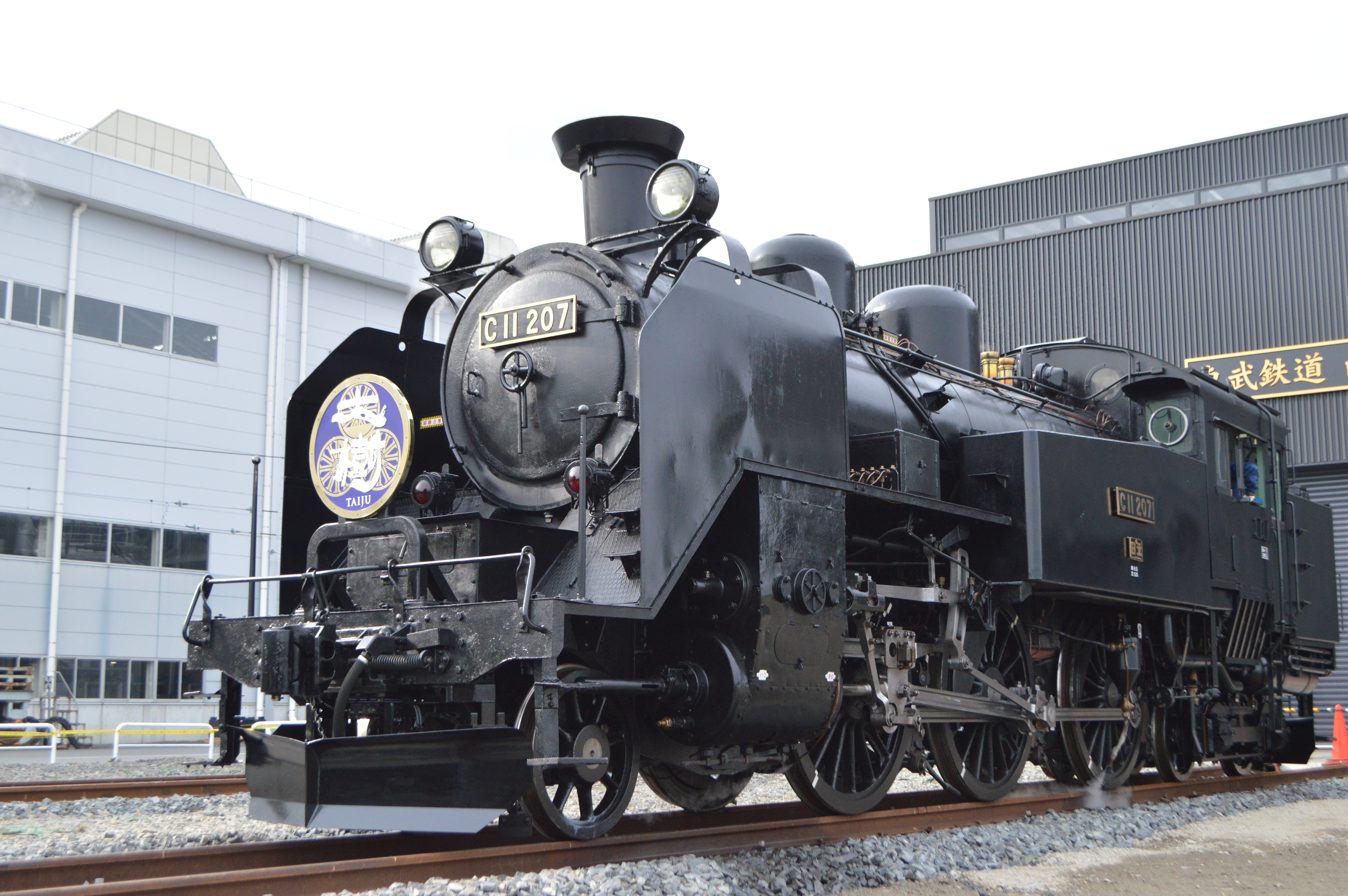
C11 207 at Tobu's Minami-Kurihashi Depot in December 2016

Tobu has leased former JNR Class C11 steam locomotive C11 207 from JR Hokkaido for use on the 12.4 km section of the Kinugawa Line between Shimo-Imaichi and Kinugawa-Onsen stations from 10 August 2017. Turntables will also be installed at Shimo-Imaichi and Kinugawa-Onsen to turn the locomotive in service. A two-stall engine shed is also being constructed for the steam loco at Shimo-Imaichi.

== See also ==
- List of railway lines in Japan
