= Kinugawa (train) =

Japanese train service

Kinugawa Spacia Kinugawa
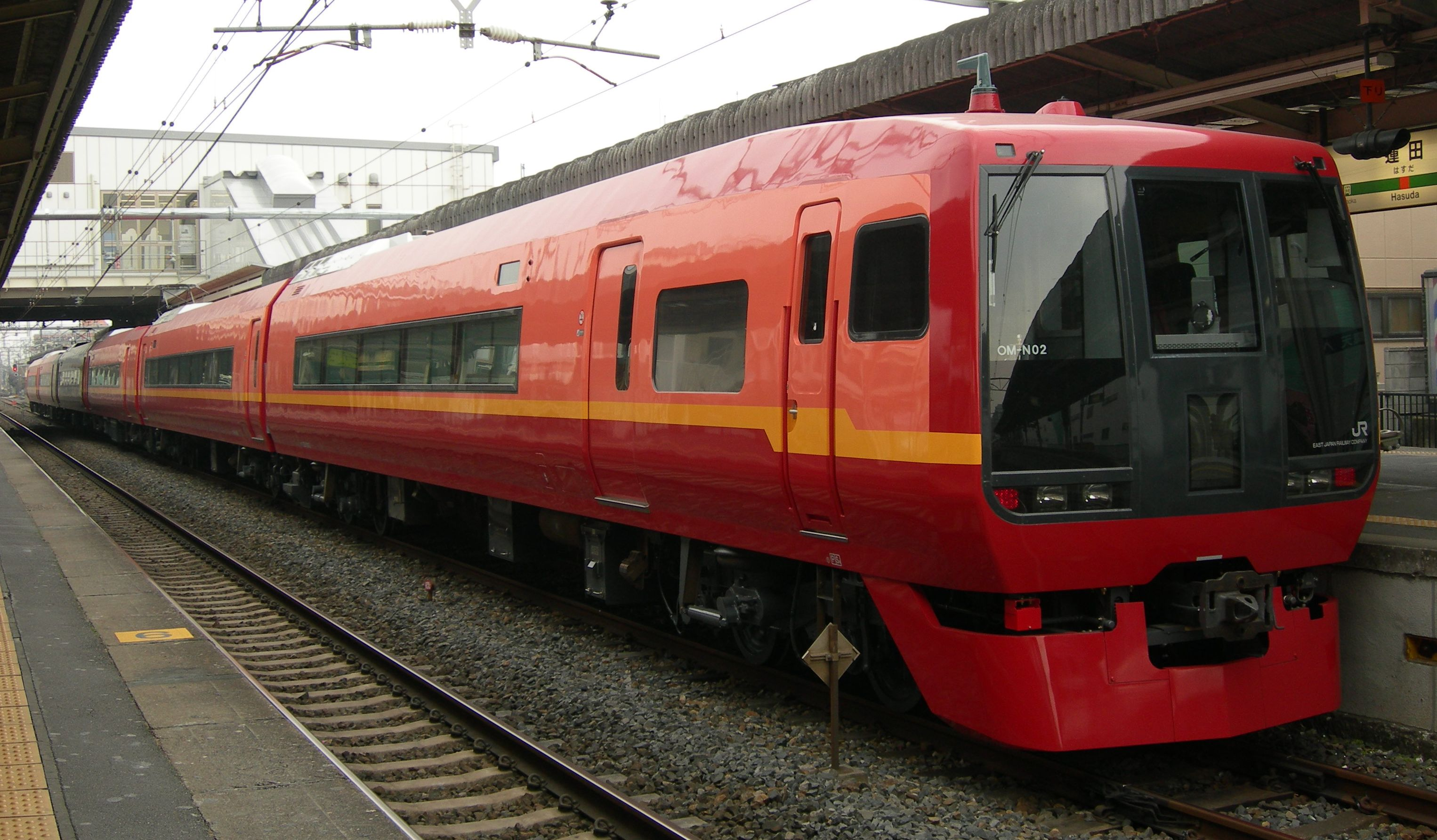
- A 253-1000 series EMU, February 2011

Overview
- Service type: Limited express
- First service: 2006
- Current operator(s): JR East/Tobu Railway

Route
- Line(s) used: Yamanote Freight Line, Tōhoku Main Line, Tōbu Nikkō Line, Tōbu Kinugawa Line

Technical
- Rolling stock: 253-1000 series, Tobu 100 series
- Operating speed: 120 km/h (75 mph)

The Kinugawa (きぬがわ) and Spacia Kinugawa (スペーシアきぬがわ) are limited express train services in Japan operated jointly by the East Japan Railway Company (JR East) and Tobu Railway between Shinjuku in Tokyo and Kinugawa-Onsen in Tochigi Prefecture.

== Station stops ==
Kinugawa and Spacia Kinugawa services alike stop at the following stations.

- Shinjuku
- Ikebukuro
- Urawa
- Ōmiya
- Tochigi
- Shin-Kanuma
- Shimo-Imaichi
- Kinugawa-Onsen

== Rolling stock ==
Since 4 June 2011, Kinugawa services are formed of refurbished 253-1000 series 6-car EMU sets, and Spacia Kinugawa services are formed of Tobu 100 series Spacia EMUs. Prior to 4 June 2011, JR East services were formed of a dedicated 6-car 485 series EMU set, which was occasionally substituted by a reserve 189 series set nicknamed Ayano (彩野).

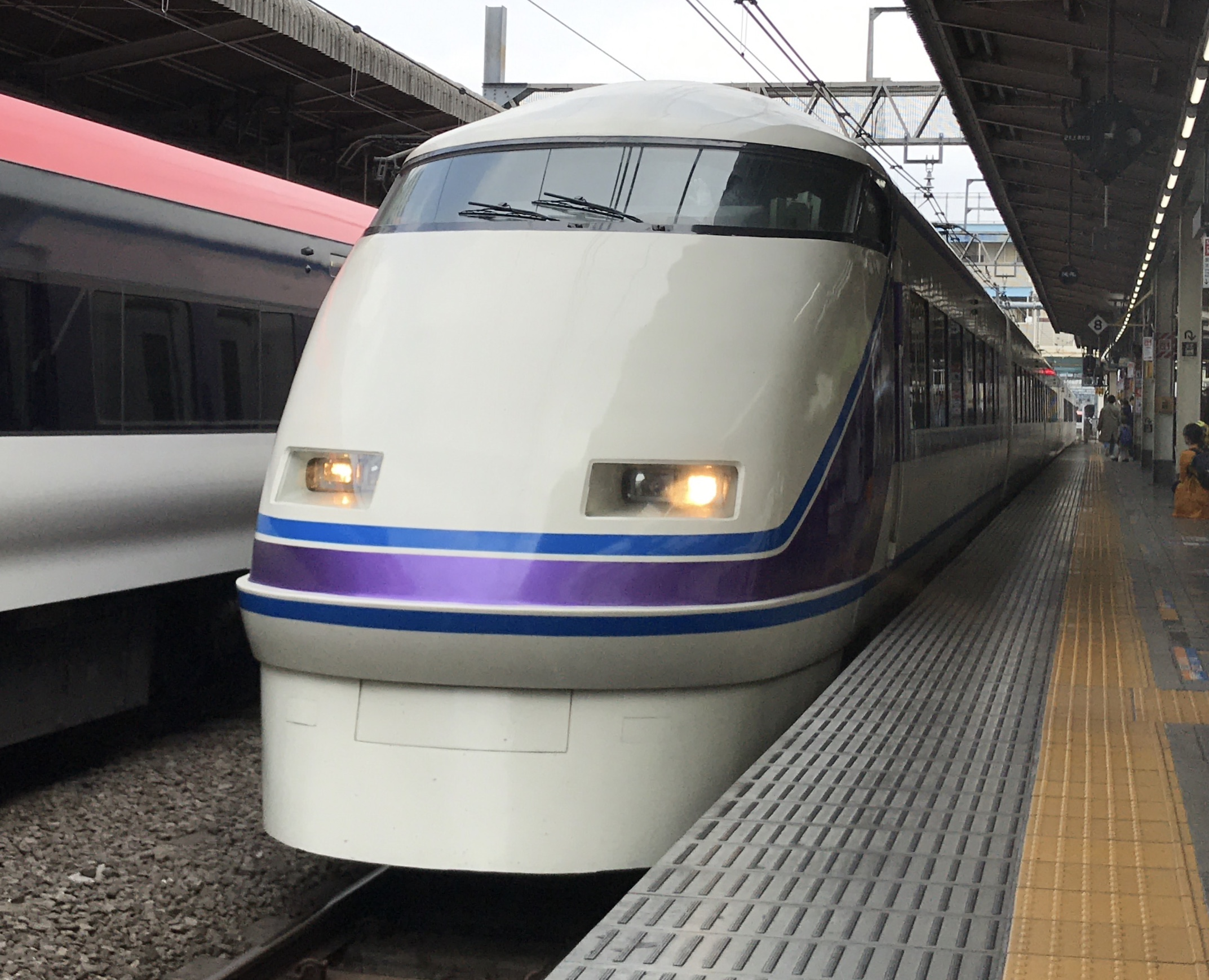
Tobu 100 series EMU on a Spacia Kinugawa service at Ikebukuro Station, April 2019

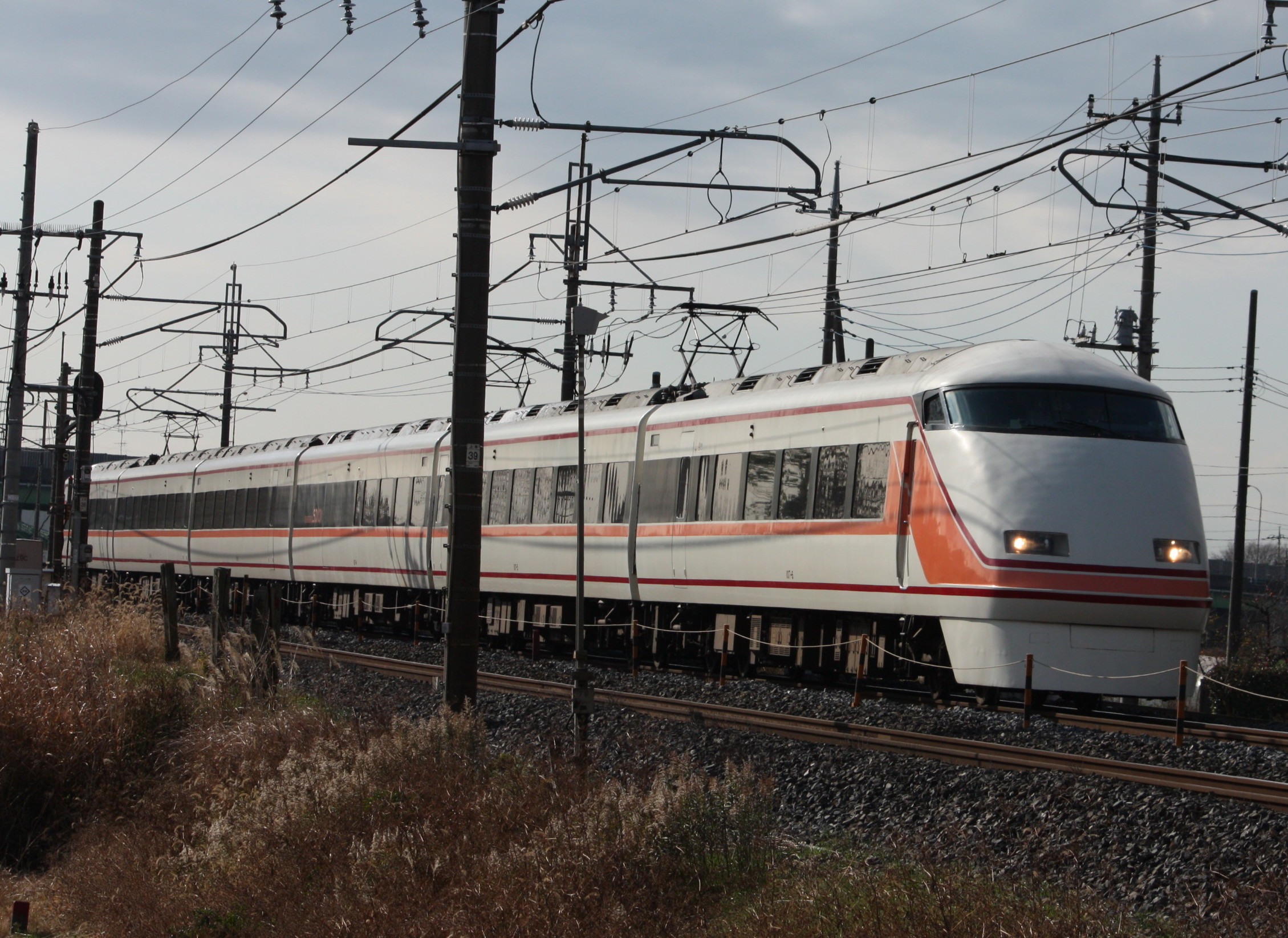
Tobu 100 series EMU on a Spacia Kinugawa service, May 2009

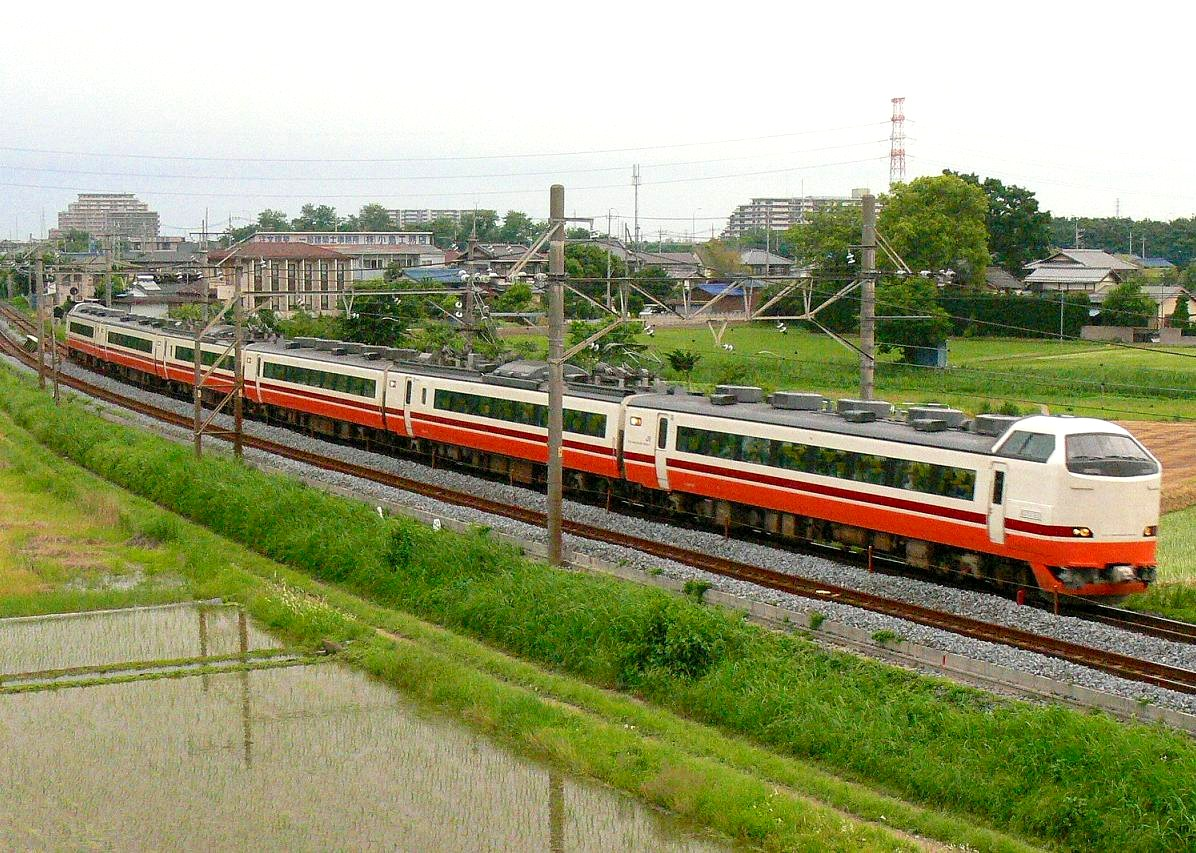
JR East 485 series EMU on a Kinugawa service, May 2006

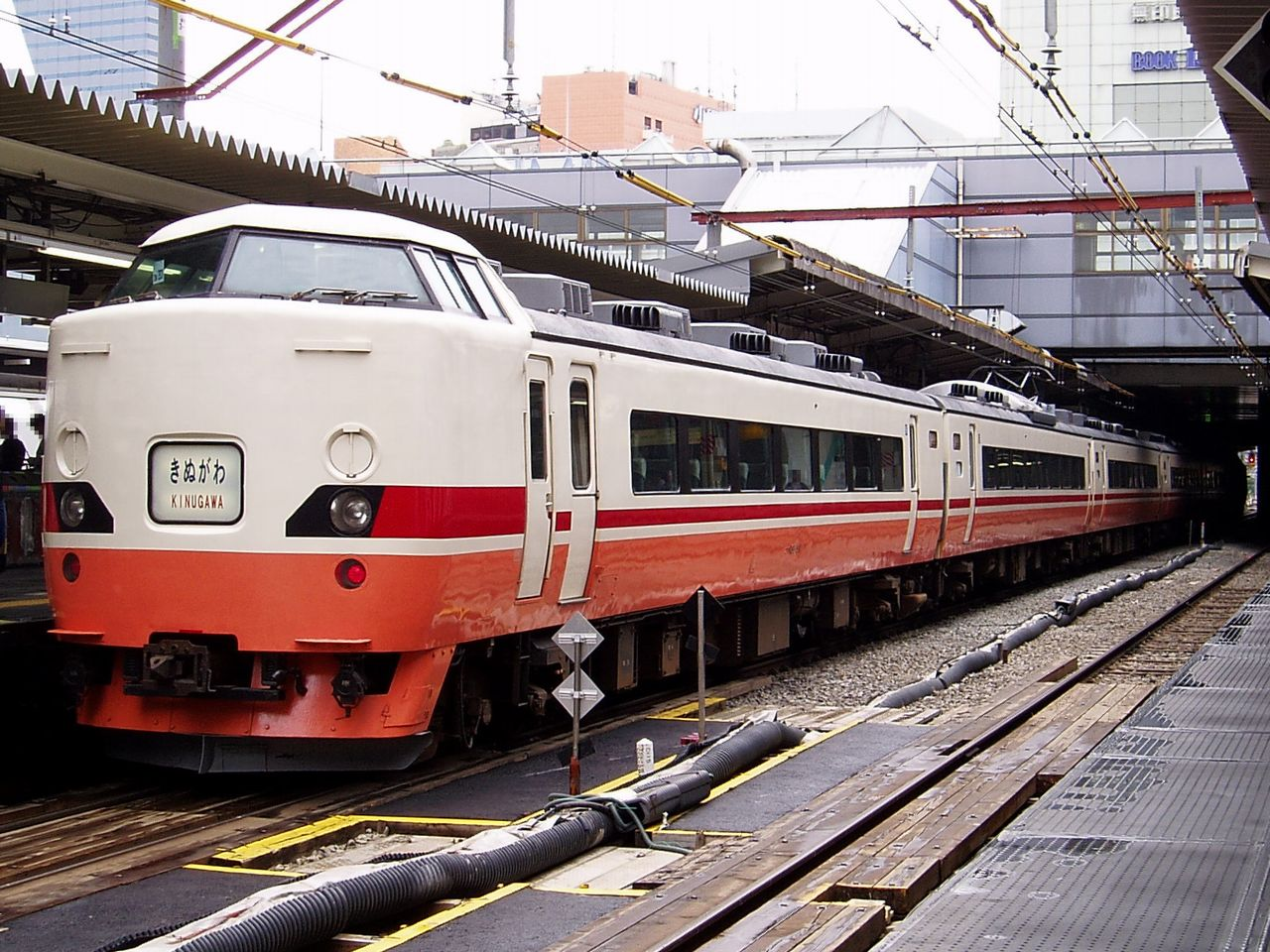
189 series "Ayano" set on a Kinugawa service at Shinjuku Station, June 2007

== History ==
The Kinugawa service was introduced from 18 March 2006 as a limited express service operated jointly by JR East and Tobu between Shinjuku and Kinugawa-Onsen, utilizing a newly constructed link between the two railways' tracks at Kurihashi Station, where trains stop briefly for a crew change.

From the start of the revised timetable on 16 March 2013, Kinugawa services also stop at Urawa Station.

== See also ==
- List of named passenger trains of Japan
- Nikkō – a similar service between Shinjuku and Tōbu Nikkō, also jointly operated by JR East and Tobu
