= Shimo-Imaichi Station =

Railway station in Nikkō, Tochigi Prefecture, Japan

TN23 Shimo-Imaichi Station 下今市駅
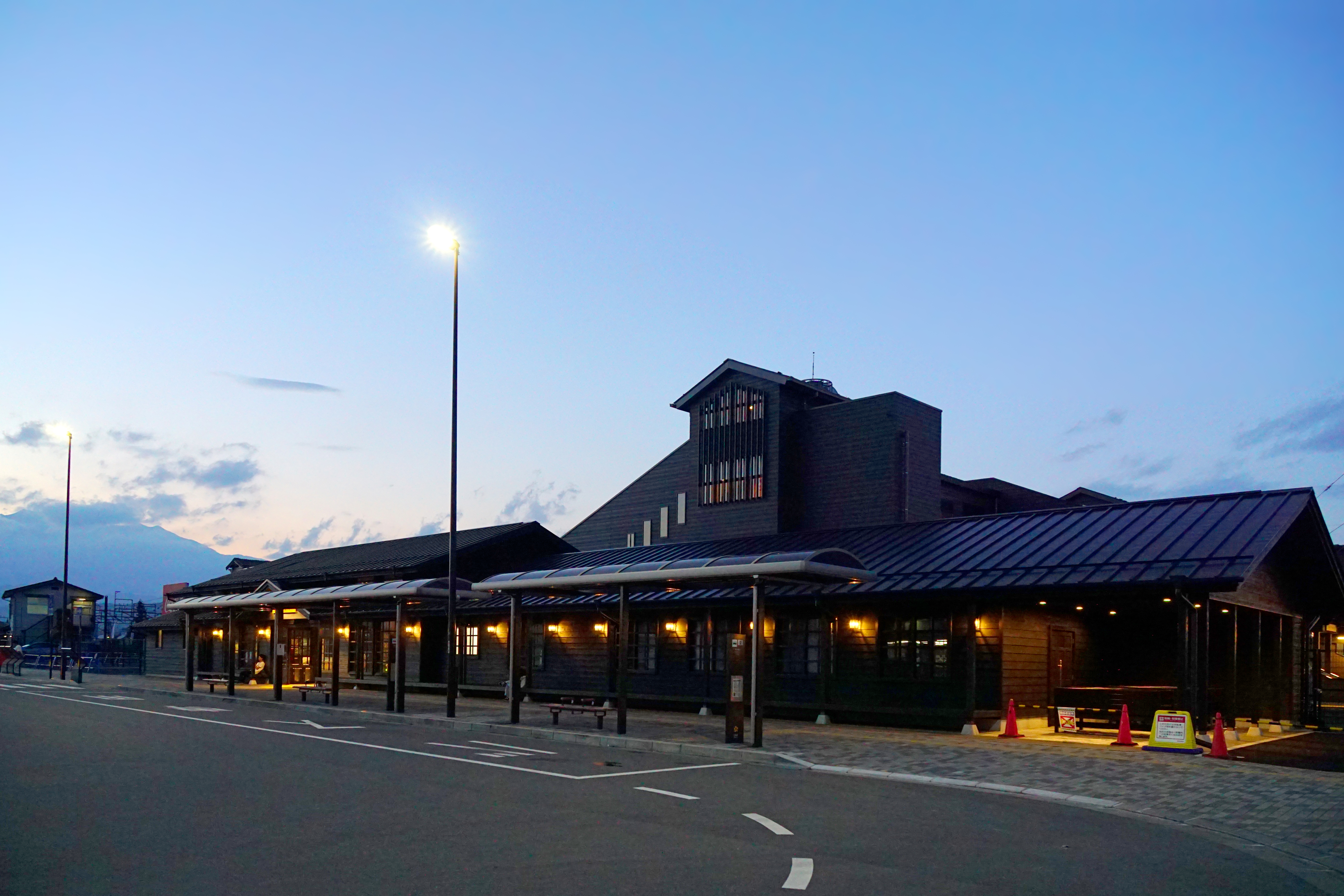
- Shimo-Imaichi Station frontage in August 2017

General information
- Location: 1110 Imaichi, Nikkō-shi, Tochigi-ken 321-1261; Japan
- Coordinates: 36.7256°N 139.6932°E
- Operator: Tōbu Railway
- Lines: Tōbu Nikkō Line; Tōbu Kinugawa Line
- Distance: 87.4 km from Tōbu-Dōbutsu-Kōen
- Platforms: 2 island platforms
- Tracks: 4

Other information
- Station code: TN-23
- Website: Official website

History
- Opened: 7 July 1929
- Rebuilt: 2016-2017

Passengers
- FY2019: 2,432 daily

Services
Preceding station	Tobu Railway	Following station
Shin-Kanuma TN18 towards Shinjuku	Nikkō	Tōbu–Nikkō TN25 Terminus
Shin-Kanuma TN18 towards Asakusa	Spacia X	Tōbu–Nikkō TN25 Terminus
Tochigi TN11 towards Asakusa	Kegon	Tōbu–Nikkō TN25 Terminus
Terminus	SL Taiju Futara	Tōbu–Nikkō TN25 Terminus
Shin-Kanuma TN18 towards Minami-Kurihashi	Nikkō Line Express	Tōbu–Nikkō TN25 Terminus
Myojin TN22 towards Tōbu-Dōbutsu-Kōen	Nikkō Line Local	Kami-Imaichi TN24 towards Tōbu–Nikkō
Shin-Kanuma TN18 towards Shinjuku	Kinugawa	Tobu World Square TN55 towards Kinugawa–Onsen
Shin-Kanuma TN11 towards Asakusa	Spacia X	Tobu World Square TN55 towards Kinugawa–Onsen
Tochigi TN11 towards Asakusa	Kinu	Tobu World Square TN55 towards Kinugawa–Onsen
Tochigi TN11 towards Asakusa	Aizu	Shin-Takatoku TN53 towards Shin-Fujiwara
Terminus	SL Taiju	Tobu World Square TN55 towards Kinugawa–Onsen
Terminus	Kinugawa Line	Daiyamukō TN51 towards Shin-Fujiwara
Location
- Location within Tochigi Prefecture Location within Japan

Shimo-Imaichi Station (下今市駅, Shimo-Imaichi-eki) is a railway station in the city of Nikkō, Tochigi, Japan, operated by the private railway operator Tōbu Railway. The station is numbered "TN-23".

== Lines ==
Shimo-Imaichi Station is served by the 94.5 km Tōbu Nikkō Line, and is also the starting point of the 16.2 km Tobu Kinugawa Line to Shin-Fujiwara. It is 87.4 km from the starting point of the Tobu Nikko Line at Tōbu-Dōbutsu-Kōen.

== Station layout ==
The station consists of two island platforms serving four tracks, connected to the station entrance by a footbridge.

=== Platforms ===
1	■ Tōbu Nikkō Line	for Tōbu-Nikkō
2	■ Tōbu Kinugawa Line	for Kinugawa-Onsen
3, 4	■ Tōbu Nikkō Line	for Shin-Tochigi and Tōbu-Dōbutsu-Kōen

== History ==
Shimo-Imaichi Station opened on 7 July 1929.

From 17 March 2012, station numbering was introduced on all Tōbu lines, with Shimo-Imaichi Station becoming "TN-23".

A turntable was installed next to the station in 2016 for turning the steam locomotive used on steam-hauled tourist trains operating between Shimo-Imaichi and Kinugawa-Onsen since August 2017. The turntable was acquired from the JR West Nagatoshi Station in Yamaguchi Prefecture. A two-stall engine shed to house the steam locomotive was also constructed adjacent to it. At the same time, the station was renovated to architecturally resemble a Japanese railway station from the Showa era.

The original footbridge linking the platforms received protection by the national government as a Registered Tangible Cultural Property in 2017.

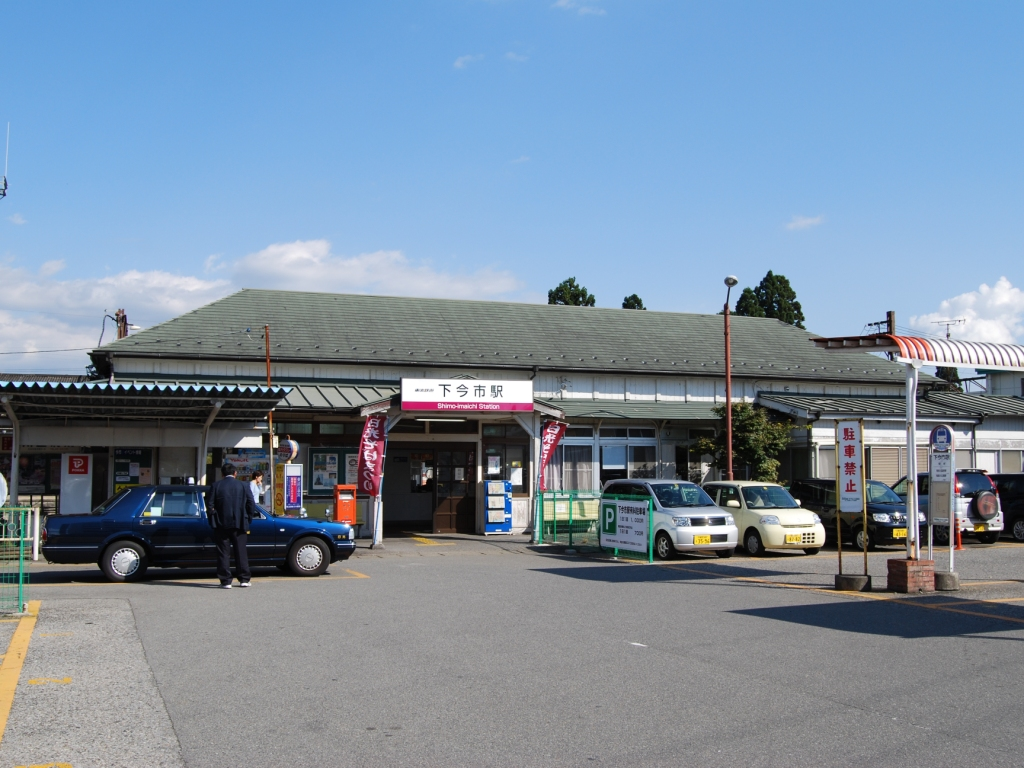
The station in October 2008

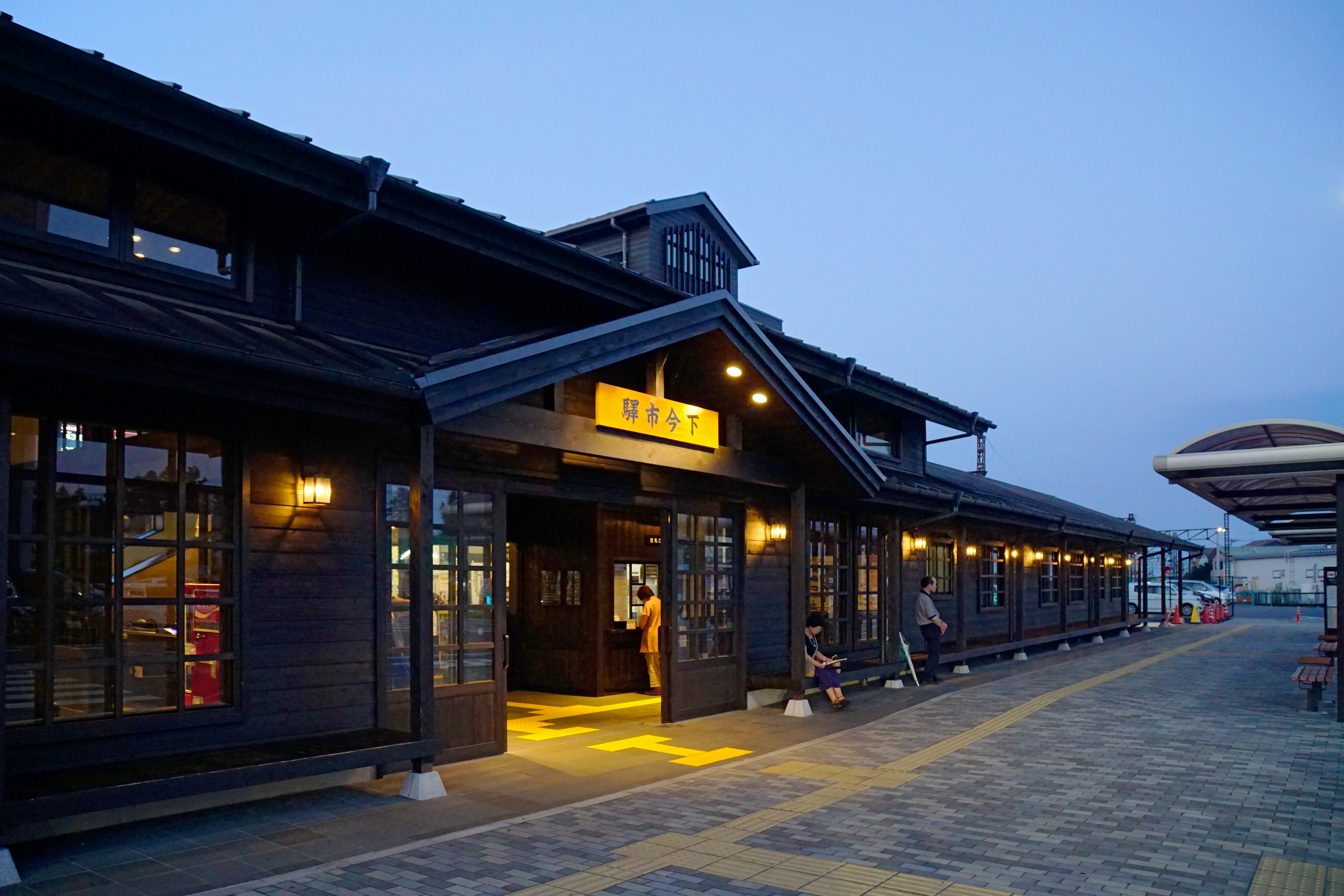
The station entrance in August 2017, following renovation

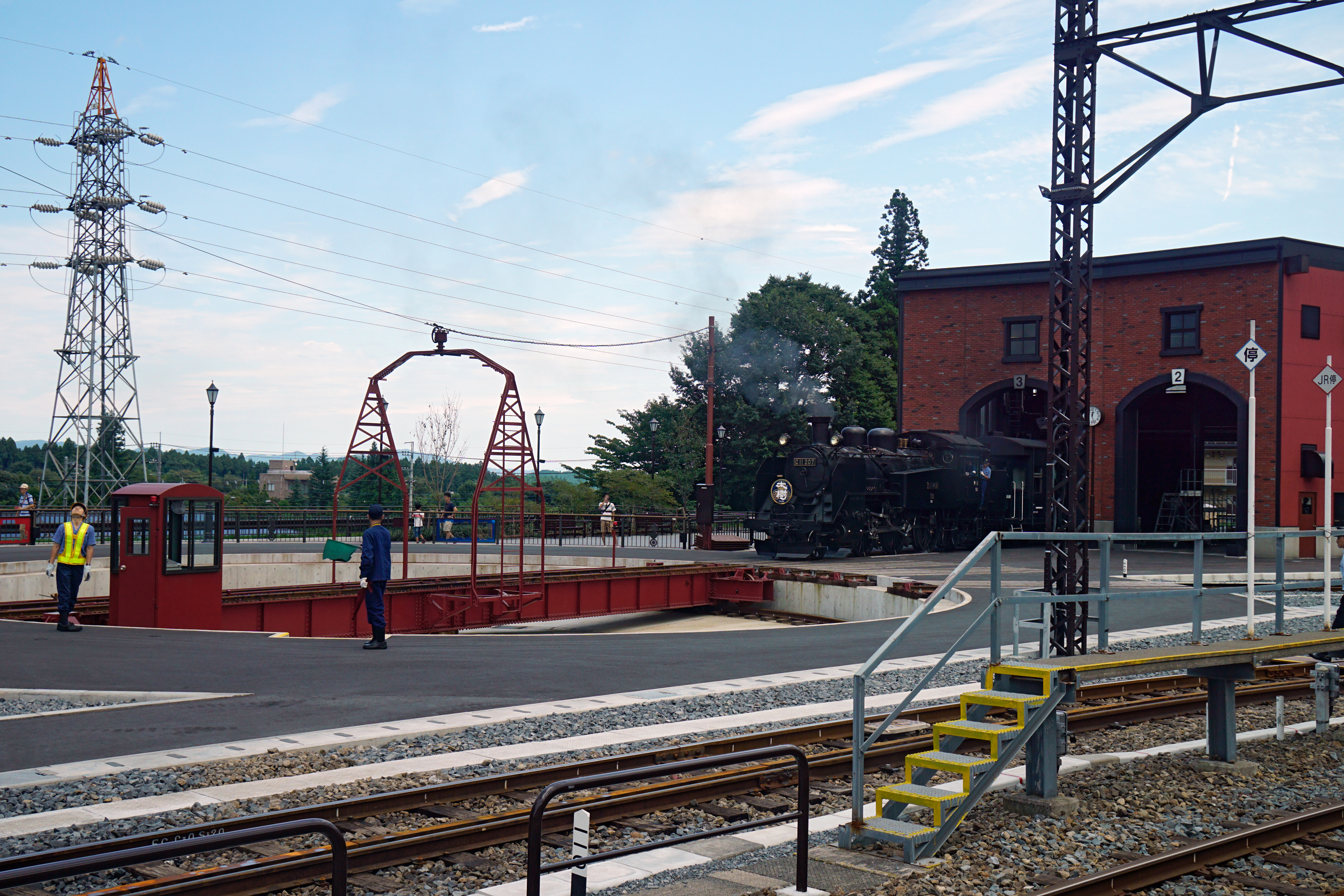
The turntable and engine shed in August 2017

== Passenger statistics ==
In fiscal 2019, the station was used by an average of 2432 passengers daily (boarding passengers only).

== Surrounding area ==
- Former Imaichi City Hall
- Imaichi Post Office
- National Route 119
- National Route 121

== See also ==
- List of railway stations in Japan
