= Kinugawa–Onsen Station =

Railway station in Nikko, Tochigi Prefecture, Japan

TN56 Kinugawa-Onsen Station 鬼怒川温泉駅
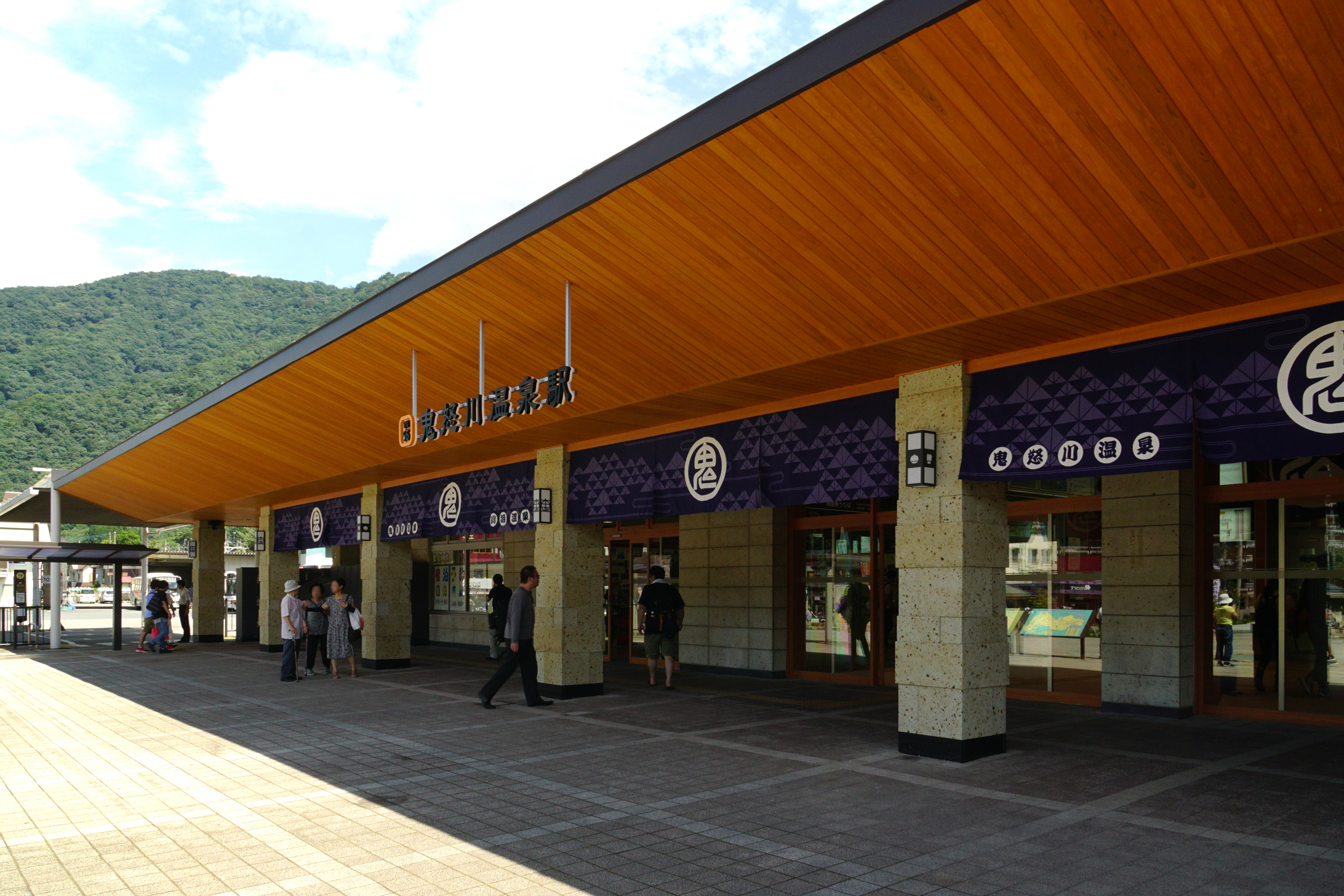
- Kinugawa-Onsen Station in August 2017

General information
- Location: 1390 Kinugawa-Onsen Ohara, Nikkō-shi, Tochigi-ken 321-2522; Japan
- Coordinates: 36.8227°N 139.7163°E
- Operator: Tobu Railway
- Line: Tobu Kinugawa Line
- Distance: 12.4 km from Shimo-Imaichi
- Platforms: 2 island platforms

Other information
- Station code: TN-56
- Website: Official website

History
- Opened: 17 March 1919
- Former names: Otaki; Shimotaki (until 1927)

Passengers
- FY2019: 2,731 daily

Services
Preceding station	Tobu Railway	Following station
Tobu World Square TN55 towards Shinjuku	Kinugawa	Terminus
Tobu World Square TN55 towards Asakusa	Spacia X	Terminus
Tobu World Square TN55 towards Asakusa	Kinu	Terminus
Tobu World Square TN55 towards Asakusa	Aizu	Kinugawa-Kōen TN57 towards Shin-Fujiwara
Tobu World Square TN55 towards Shimo-Imaichi	SL Taiju	Terminus
Tobu World Square TN55 towards Shimo-Imaichi	Kinugawa Line	Kinugawa-Kōen TN57 towards Shin-Fujiwara
Location
- Location within Tochigi Prefecture Location within Japan

Kinugawa-Onsen Station (鬼怒川温泉駅, Kinugawa-Onsen-eki) is a railway station in the city of Nikkō, Tochigi, Japan, operated by the private railway operator Tobu Railway. The station is numbered "TN-56".

== Lines ==
Kinugawa–Onsen Station is served by the Tobu Kinugawa Line, with direct services to and from Asakusa and Shinjuku in Tokyo, and is 12.4 km from the starting point of the line at Shimo-Imaichi.

== Station layout ==
The station consists of two island platforms connected by a footbridge.

=== Platforms ===
1	■ Tobu Kinugawa Line	for Shimo-Imaichi (starting trains only)
2	■ Tobu Kinugawa Line	for Shimo-Imaichi for Shin-Fujiwara
3	■ Tobu Kinugawa Line	for Shin-Fujiwara
4	■ Tobu Kinugawa Line	for Shimo-Imaichi

== History ==
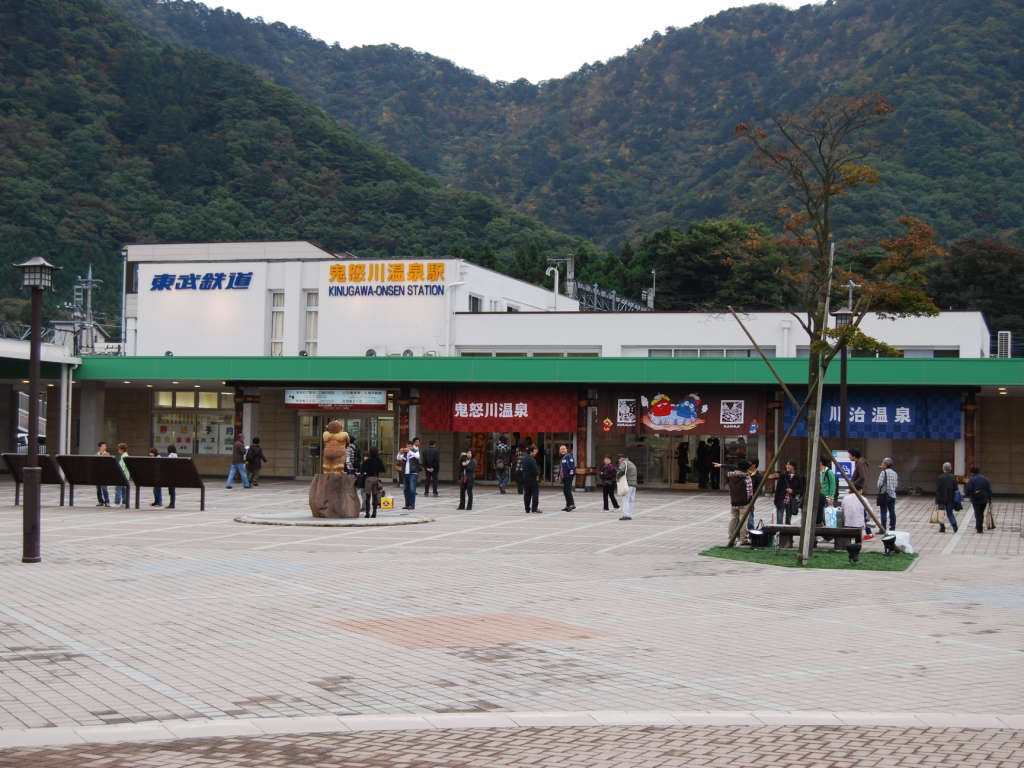
The station in October 2008

The station opened on 17 March 1919 as Shimo-Taki Station (下滝駅). It was renamed Otaki Station (大滝駅) on 19 March 1922, and Kinugawa-Onsen on 19 February 1927.

From 17 March 2012, station numbering was introduced on all Tobu lines, with Kinugawa–Onsen Station becoming "TN-55". It was renumbered "TN-56" on 21 April 2017 ahead of the opening of Tobu World Square Station (TN-55) in July 2017.

A turntable was installed next to the station during 2016 for turning the steam locomotive to be used on steam-hauled tourist trains operating between Shimo-Imaichi and Kinugawa-Onsen from summer 2017. The turntable was acquired from the JR West Miyoshi Station in Hiroshima Prefecture.

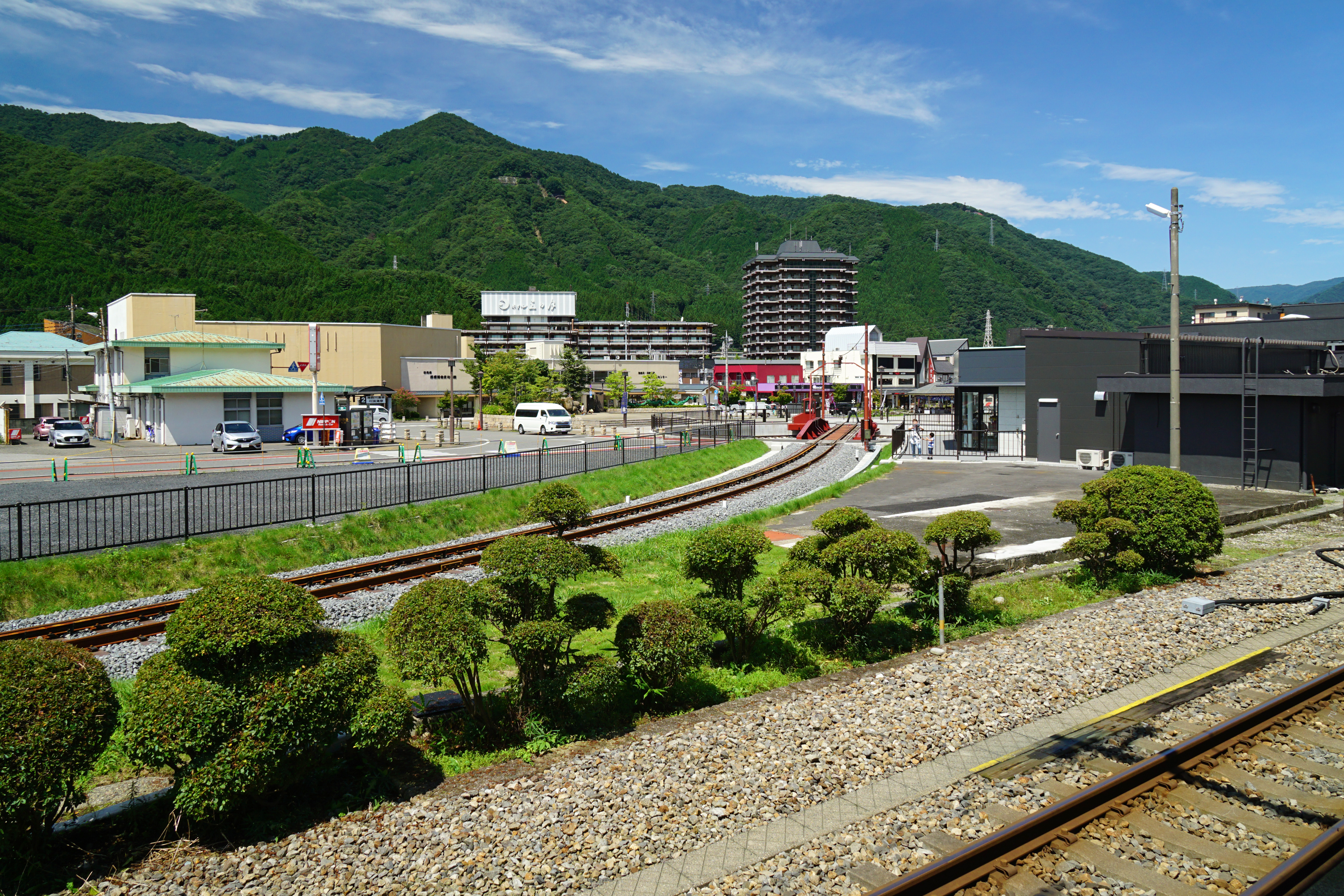
The spur leading to the turntable in August 2017

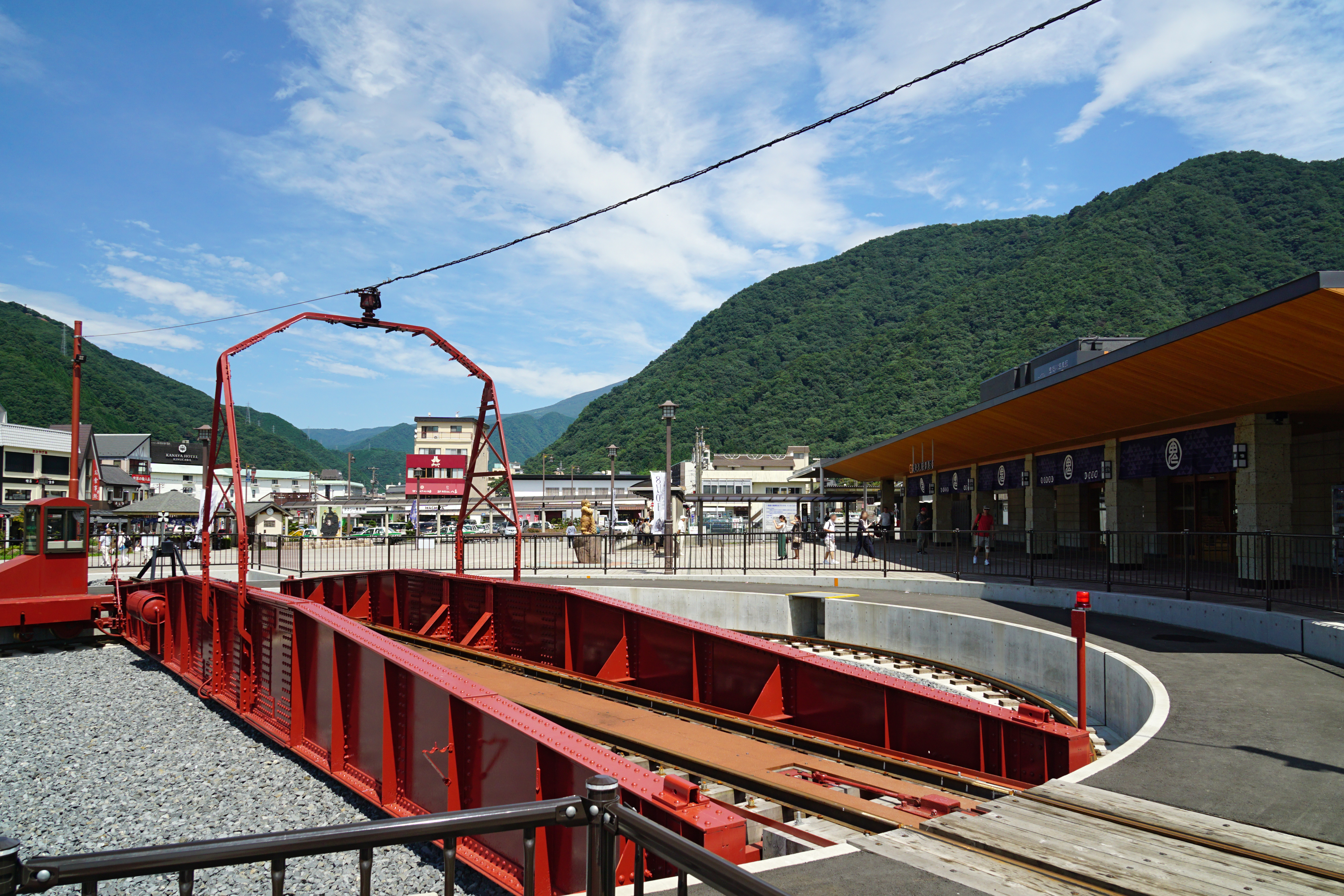
The turntable in August 2017

== Passenger statistics ==
In fiscal 2019, the station was used by an average of 2731 passengers daily (boarding passengers only).

== Surrounding area ==
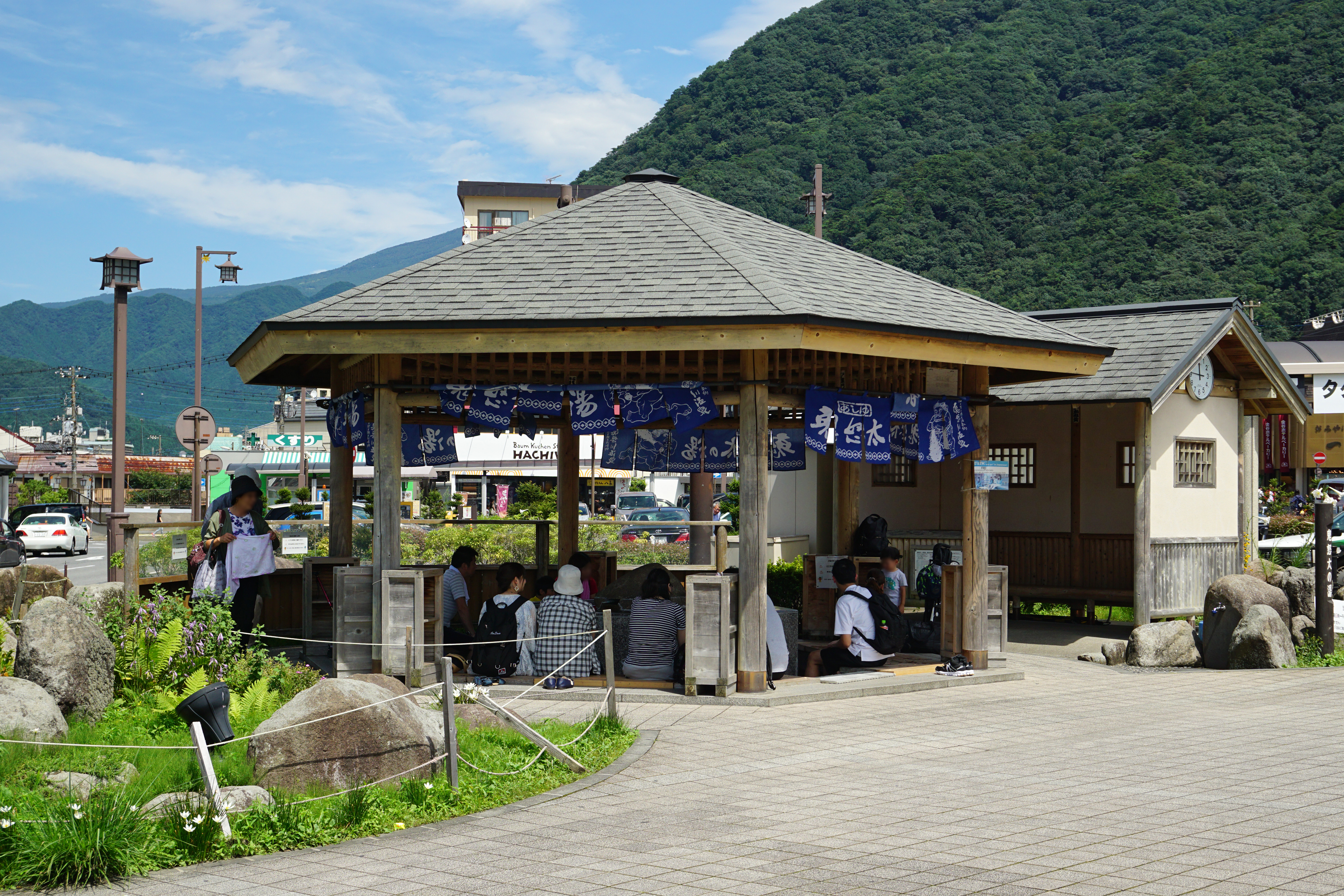
The public ashiyu footbath in front of the station in August 2017

- Kinugawa River
- Kinugawa Onsen hot spring area
- Tobu World Square theme park
- Kinugawa Onsen Post Office
- National Route 120
- National Route 121

== See also ==
- List of railway stations in Japan
