= Kinderdijk windmills =

UNESCO World Heritage Site

Mill Network at Kinderdijk-Elshout
UNESCO World Heritage Site
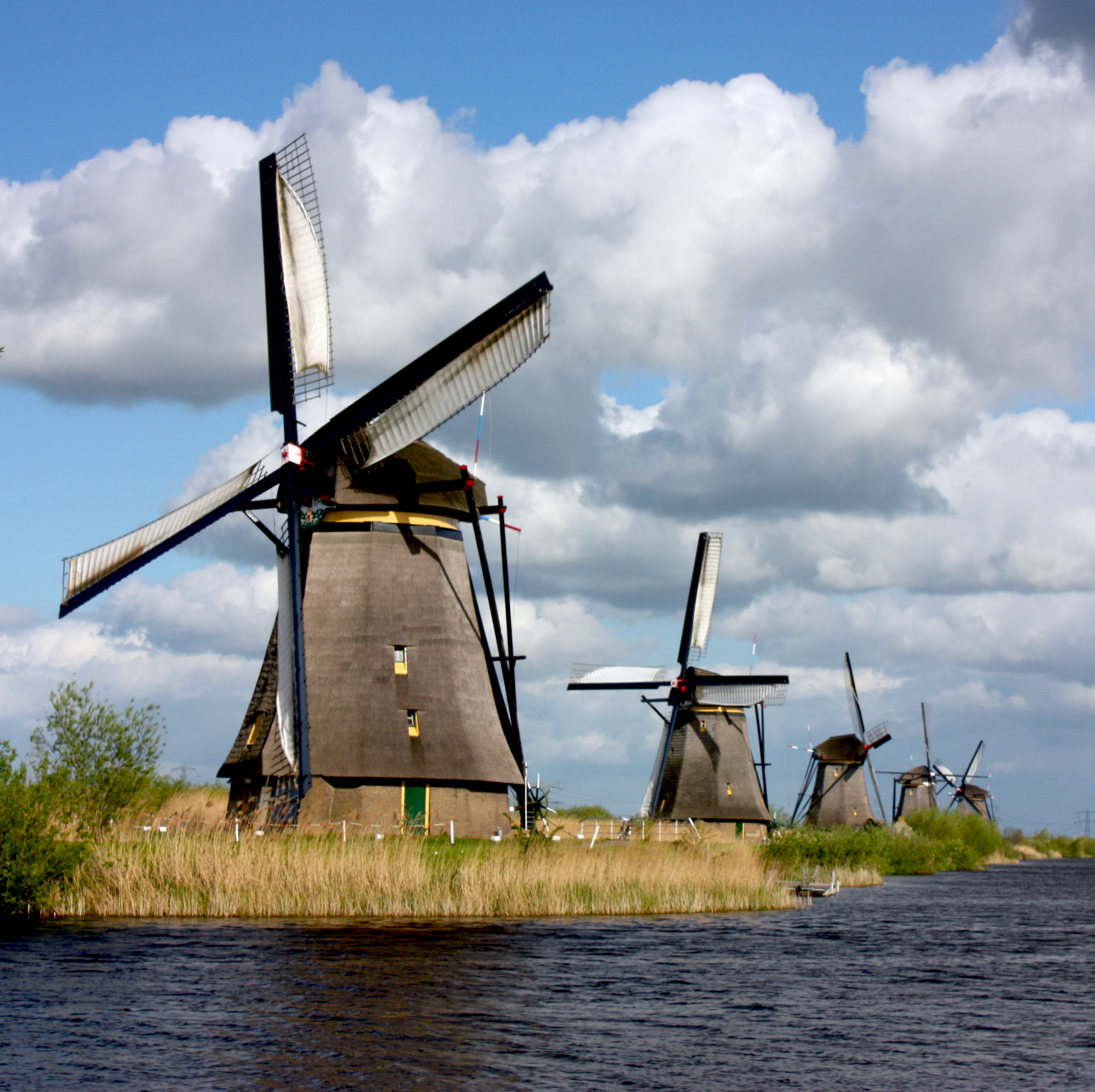
- View of windmills at Kinderdijk

- Location within South Holland Location within Netherlands
- Location: Molenlanden, Alblasserdam, South Holland, Netherlands
- Criteria: Cultural: (i), (ii), (iv)
- Reference: 818
- Inscription: 1997 (21st Session)
- Area: 322 ha (800 acres)
- Website: kinderdijk.com
- Coordinates: 51°52′57″N 4°38′58″E

The Kinderdijk windmills are a group of 19 monumental windmills in the Alblasserwaard polder, in the province of South Holland, Netherlands. Most of the mills are part of the village of Kinderdijk in the municipality of Molenlanden, and one mill, De Blokker, is part of the municipality of Alblasserdam. Built in 1738 and 1740, to keep water out of the polder, it is the largest concentration of old windmills in the Netherlands and one of the best-known Dutch tourist sites. The mills are listed as national monuments and the entire area is a protected village view since 1993. They have been a UNESCO World Heritage Site since 1997, and as such are officially named as the Mill Network at Kinderdijk-Elshout.

== History ==
Kinderdijk lies in the Alblasserwaard, at the confluence of the Lek and Noord rivers. In Alblasserwaard, problems with water became more and more apparent in the 13th century. Large canals, called "weteringen", were dug to get rid of the excess water in the polders. However, the drained soil started setting, while the level of the river rose due to the river's sand deposits. Most of the current mills were built in 1738 and 1740 (see below).

After a few centuries, an additional way to keep the polders dry was required. It was decided to build a series of windmills, with a limited capacity to bridge water level differences, but just able to pump water into a reservoir at an intermediate level between the soil in the polder and the river; the reservoir could be let out into the river through locks whenever the river level was low enough; the river level has both seasonal and tidal variations. During the nineteenth century sinking land and rising water levels required more water pumping capacity than the mills could provide. The Nederwaard and Overwaard water boards (both of which owned and operated a row of the mills) had steam powered pumping stations built. By the 1920s one of these was electrified, while the other received diesel powered engines. The brick Nederwaard windmills were decommissioned, although the millers and their families were allowed to continue to inhabit them. Fuel shortage during World War II briefly forced the water boards to return to wind powered water pumping, which proved to be the last hurrah for the windmills. After the war all mills were decommissioned and the millers released from their contracts. By this time there was already an appreciation for the windmills' picturesque charm, which led to resistance (even at the level of national politics) when the Overwaard water board formulated plans to demolish the eight octagonal mills. The Kinderdijk windmills were already a tourist destination by then. The first museum mill (now museum mill Nederwaard) opened during the 1950s.

Today the windmills are still kept in working order, but they are no longer used for water management. The main water works are provided by two electric pumping stations near one of the entrances of the windmills site.

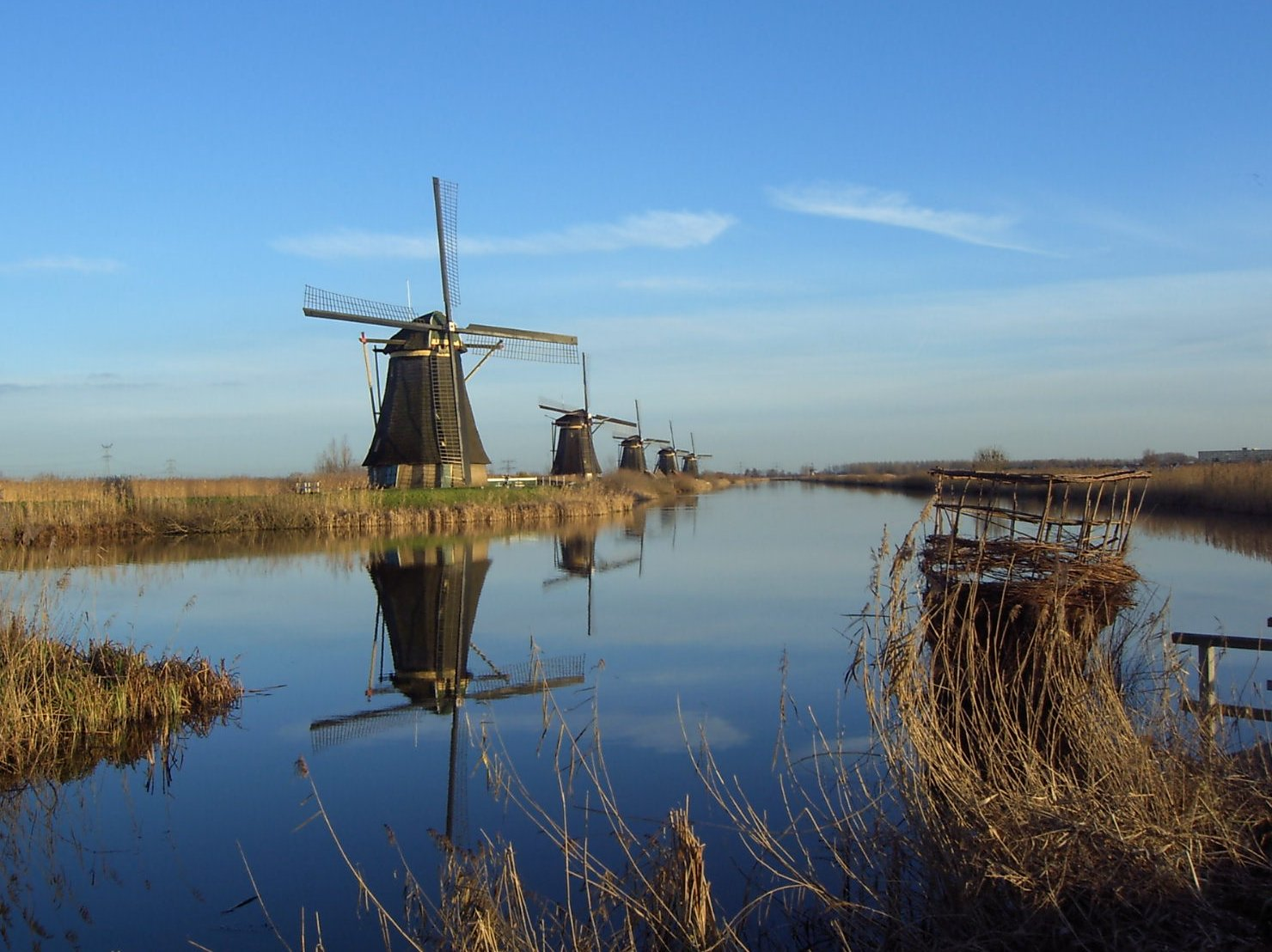
Windmills at Kinderdijk

== Description ==
Windmills

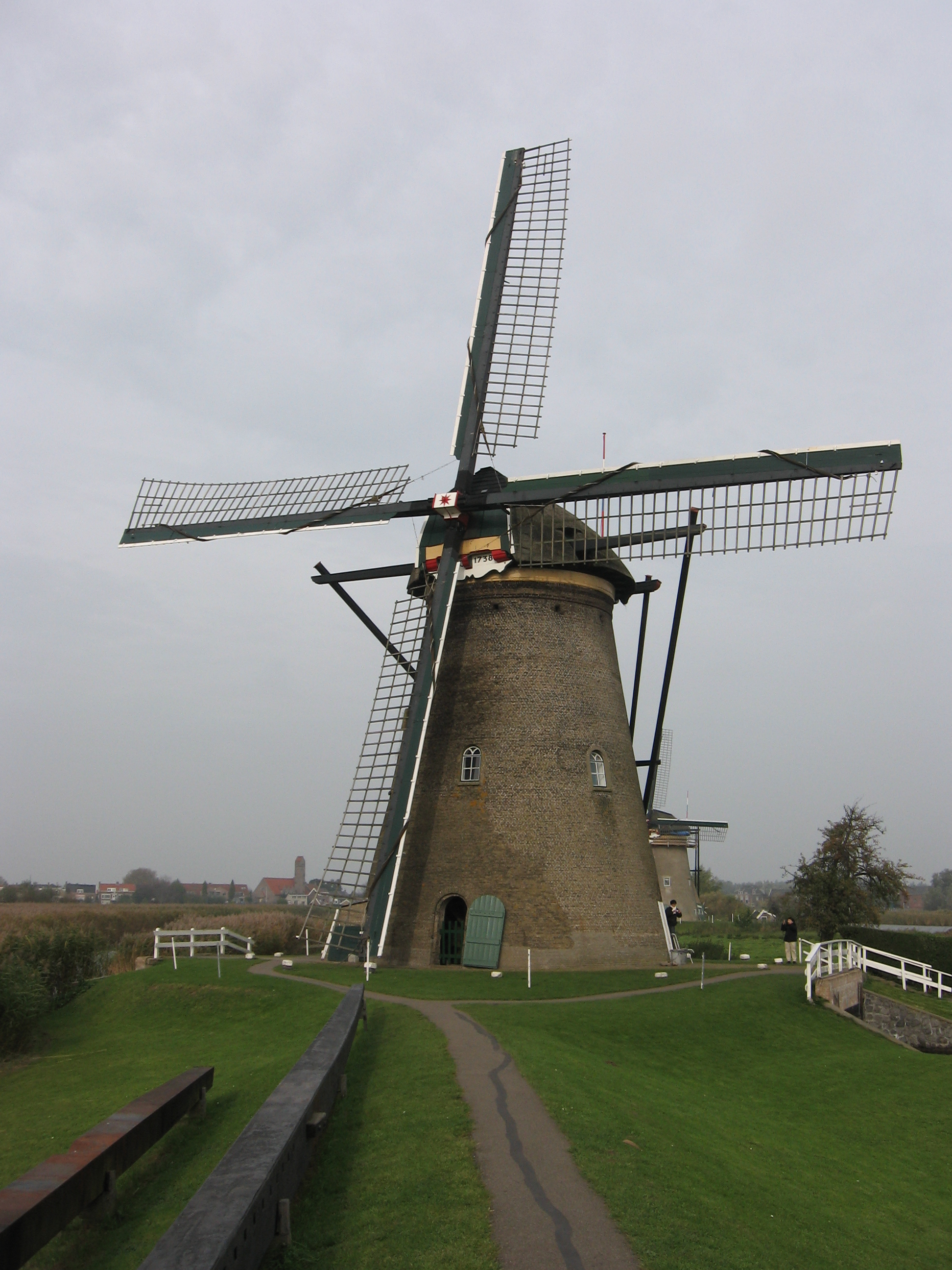
Nederwaard Mill No.2

The eight brick mills of the Nederwaard were built in 1738, the wooden mills of the Overwaard in 1740. The former move the drainage water from the lower polders of the Alblasserwaard into a reservoir, the latter that from the higher polders. Both reservoirs used to drain in turn into the river Lek by means of locks during low river water levels; nowadays modern pumping stations are in place.

=== List of windmills ===
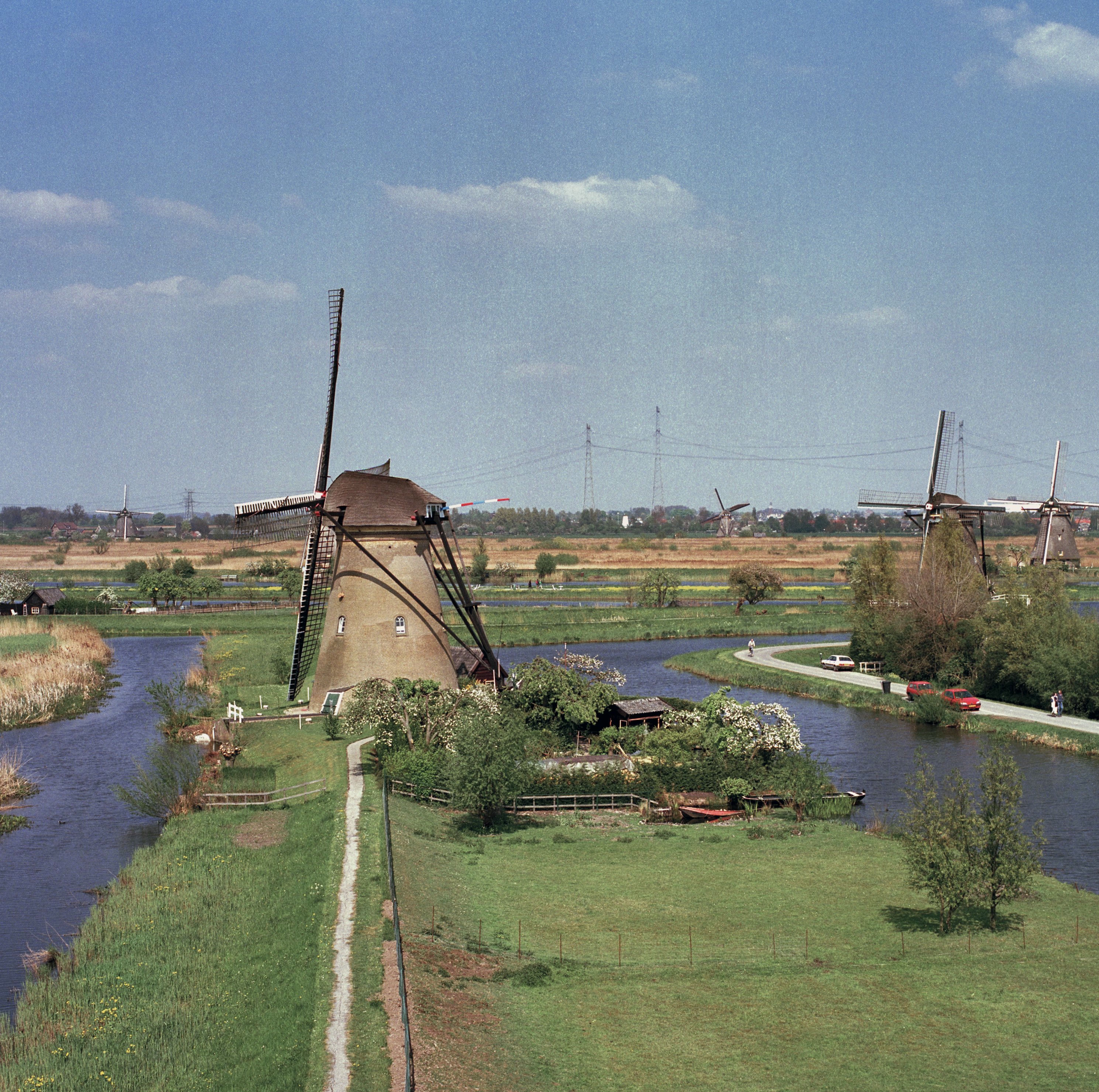
Nederwaard Mill No.6 pumping water from one canal to the next

This is a list of the 19 mills:

De Nederwaard

- Nederwaard Molen No.1 (1738)
- Nederwaard Molen No.2 (1738)
- Nederwaard Molen No.3 (1738)
- Nederwaard Molen No.4 (1738)
- Nederwaard Molen No.5 (1738)
- Nederwaard Molen No.6 (1738)
- Nederwaard Molen No.7 (1738)
- Nederwaard Molen No.8 (1738)

De Overwaard

- Overwaard Molen No.1 (1740)
- Overwaard Molen No.2 (1740–1981, 1984)
- Overwaard Molen No.3 (1740)
- Overwaard Molen No.4 (1740)
- Overwaard Molen No.5 (1740)
- Overwaard Molen No.6 (1740)
- Overwaard Molen No.7 (1740)
- Overwaard Molen No.8 (1740)

Nieuw-Lekkerland

- De Hoge Molen (1740)
- Kleine of Lage Molen (1761)

Alblasserdam

- De Blokker (1630–1997, 2001)
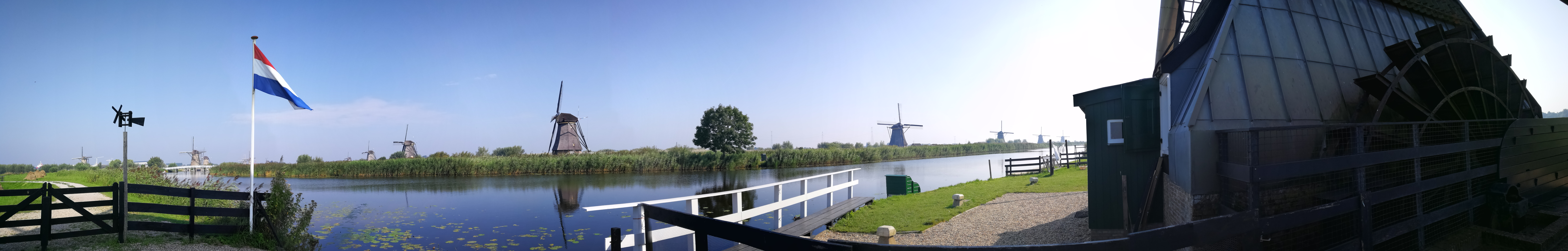
Panoramic view of the Kinderdijk Windmills.

== Modern day ==
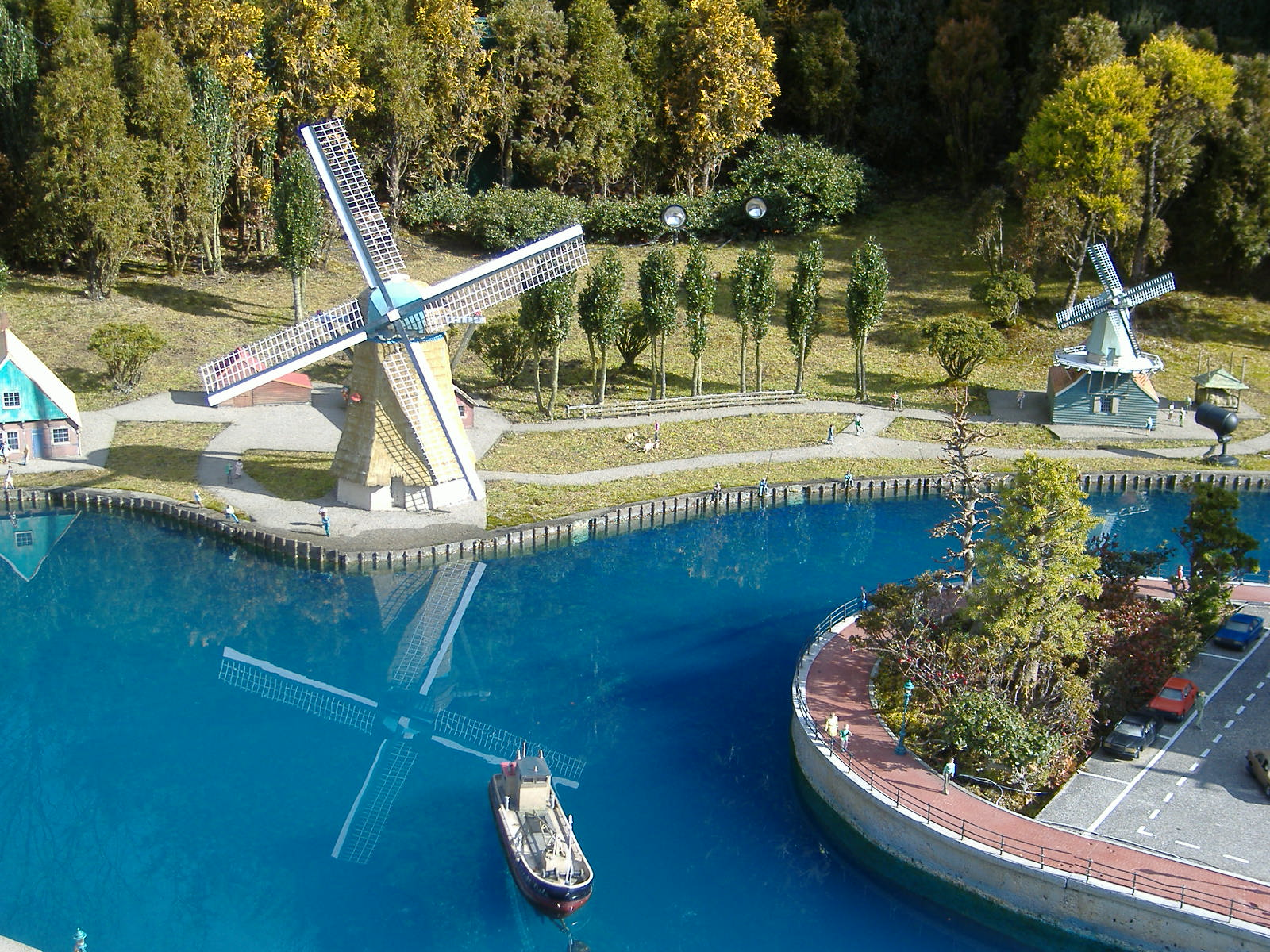
The 1/25 scale miniature windmills of Kinderdijk (left) and Zaanse Schans B (right) in Tobu World Square, Japan.

The mills are listed as national monuments and the entire area is a protected village view since 1993. The Kinderdijk-Elshout complex (which includes the mills) was inscribed as a UNESCO World Heritage Site at the 21st session of the World Heritage Committee in 1997. The mills are property of the Kinderdijk World Heritage Foundation. Today, Kinderdijk is one of the most visited cultural landmarks in the Netherlands, attracting hundreds of thousands of tourists annually. Visitors can explore the windmills via walking paths, bicycle routes, and boat tours, and several mills have been converted into museums.

== See also ==
- Wind pump
- Zaanse Schans
