= Nederwaard Molen No.1 =

One of the 19 windmills of Kinderdjik

Coordinates: 51°53′05″N 4°38′22″E

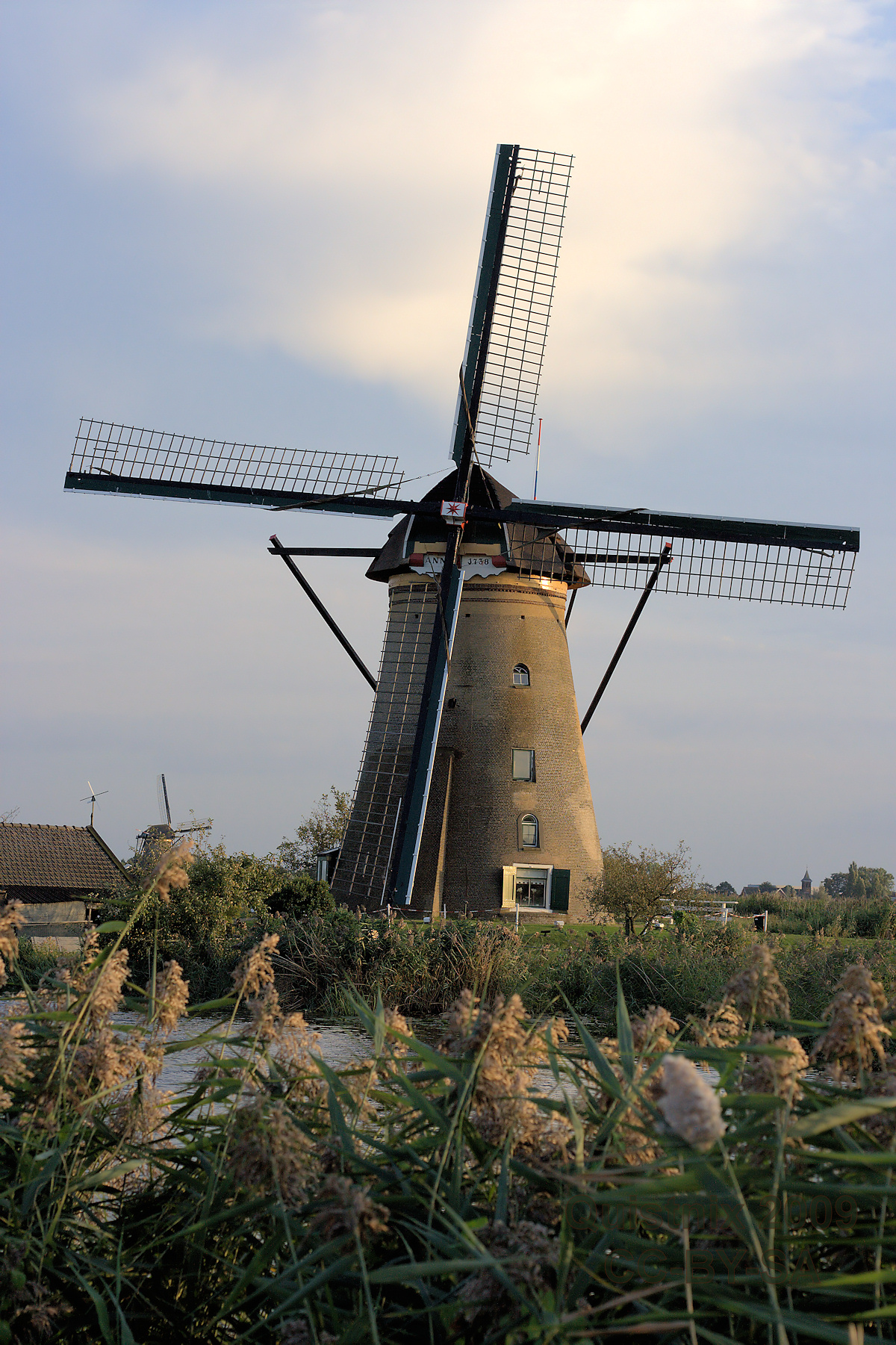

Nederwaard Molen No.1 is one of the Kinderdijk windmills, in the Dutch municipality of Molenlanden. The mill, which dates from 1738, is inhabited and cannot be visited. The owner is the Kinderdijk World Heritage Foundation. The mill has an iron paddle wheel with a diameter of 6.30 meters with which the low basin of the Nederwaard is drained. The mill has sagged over the years and probably around 1870 a buttress was built against the hull on the northeastern side to prevent further sagging.
