= Tobu World Square =

Theme park in Tochigi Prefecture, Japan

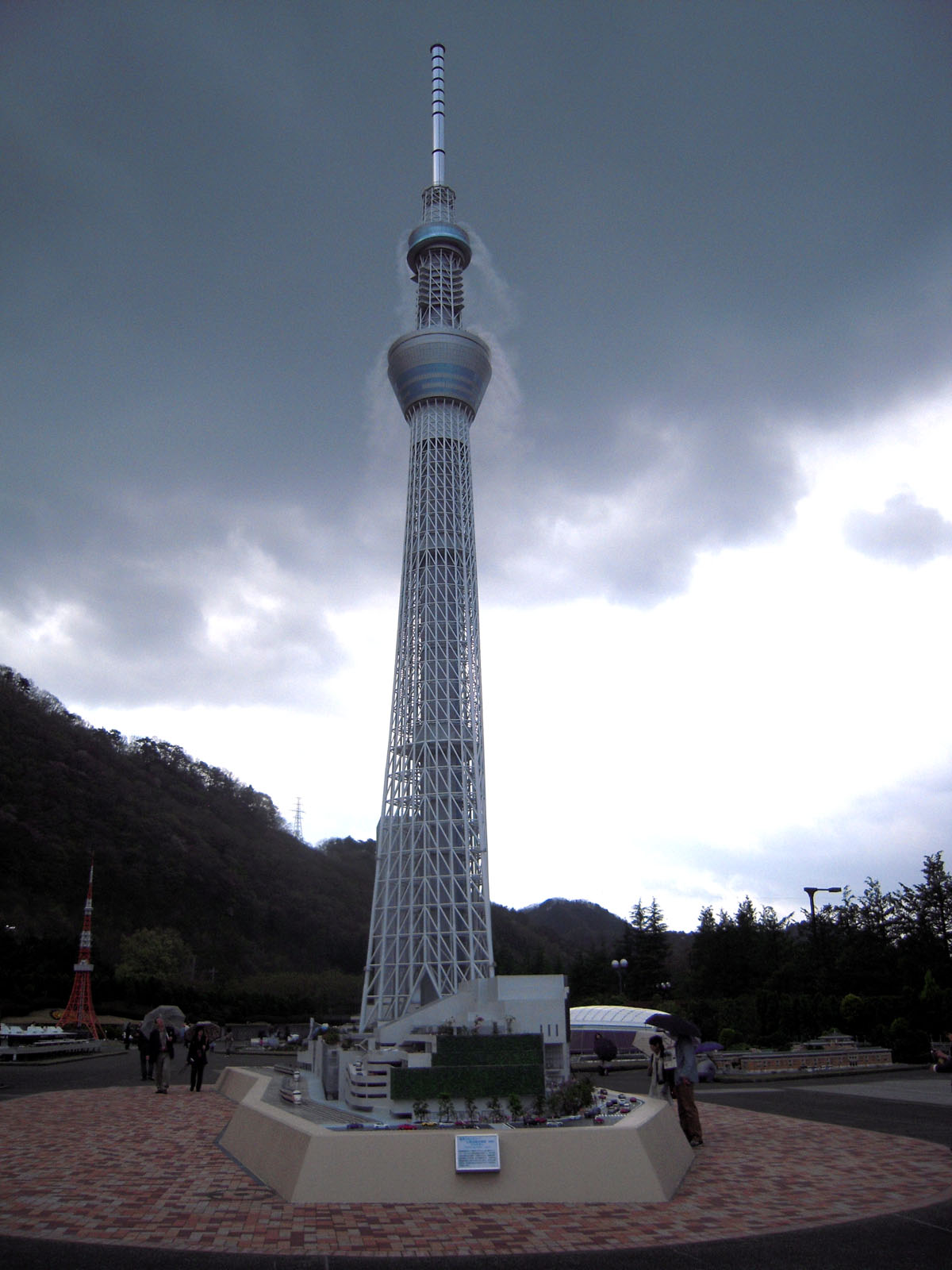
- 1:25 scale replica of Tokyo Skytree
- Interactive map of Tobu World Square
- Location: Kinugawa Onsen, Nikkō, Tochigi, Japan
- Coordinates: 36.807773°N 139.711761°E
- Website: Official website

Tobu World Square (東武ワールドスクウェア) is a theme park in Kinugawa Onsen, Nikkō, Tochigi, Japan. The theme park contains over a hundred 1:25 scale models of famous buildings, including UNESCO-designated World Cultural and Heritage Sites, complete with 140,000 1:25 miniature people.

On 24 April 2010, a 1:25 scale model of the Tokyo Skytree was unveiled at the park. This is 26 metres tall, taller than the 19.95-metre replica of the New York World Trade Center.

== Night time illumination ==
Between November and March the park has extended opening hours. During this time approximately 1.4 million red and blue lights illuminate the park. Buildings such as the Tokyo Sky Tree, the Eiffel Tower and the Duomo di Milano are lit up with LEDs and spotlights. There is also a 150-meter tunnel of lights that leads up to the Alpine Roses Park.

== List of exhibits ==
- Bold Exhibits are UNESCO Cultural heritage sites.

=== Modern Japan zone ===
| No. | Exhibits | Country | Age | Remarks |
|---|---|---|---|---|
| 0 | Tokyo Skytree and Composite Development Area | Japan | 2012 | On display from April 2010. |
| 1 | National Diet Building | Japan | 1936 | |
| 2 | Akasaka Palace | Japan | 1909 | |
| 3 | Tokyo Station | Japan | 1914 | with Shinkansen Yamabiko and Rapid Train of Chūō Line (running). |
| 4 | Tokyo Tower | Japan | 1958 | |
| 5 | Imperial Hotel (Former) | Japan | 1923 | No existing (dismantled in 1968). |
| 6 | Tokyo Dome | Japan | 1988 | |
| 7 | Tokyo National Museum, Honkan | Japan | 1938 | |
| 8 | Tokyo National Museum, Hyōkeikan | Japan | 1909 | |
| 9 | Yoyogi National Gymnasium | Japan | 1964 | |
| 10 | Narita International Airport, Terminal 2 | Japan | 1992 | |
| 11 | Fuji-maru (passenger ship) | Japan | 1989 | |
| 12 | Japanese typical fishing port | Japan | – | with Canal, Sluice and Port facility. |
| | Fuguijiao Lighthouse | Taiwan | 1962 | Exhibition from April 2018. |

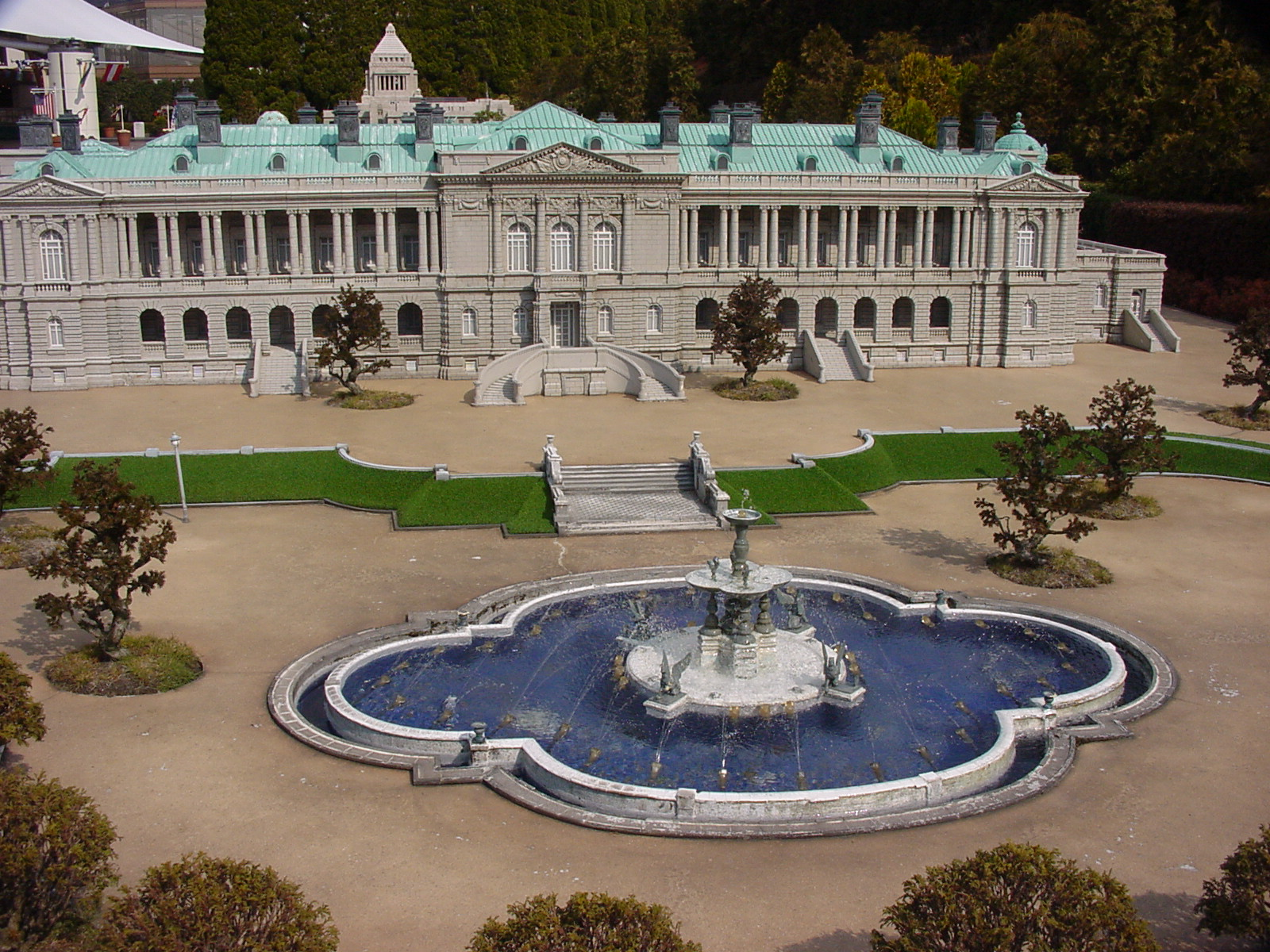
Akasaka Palace

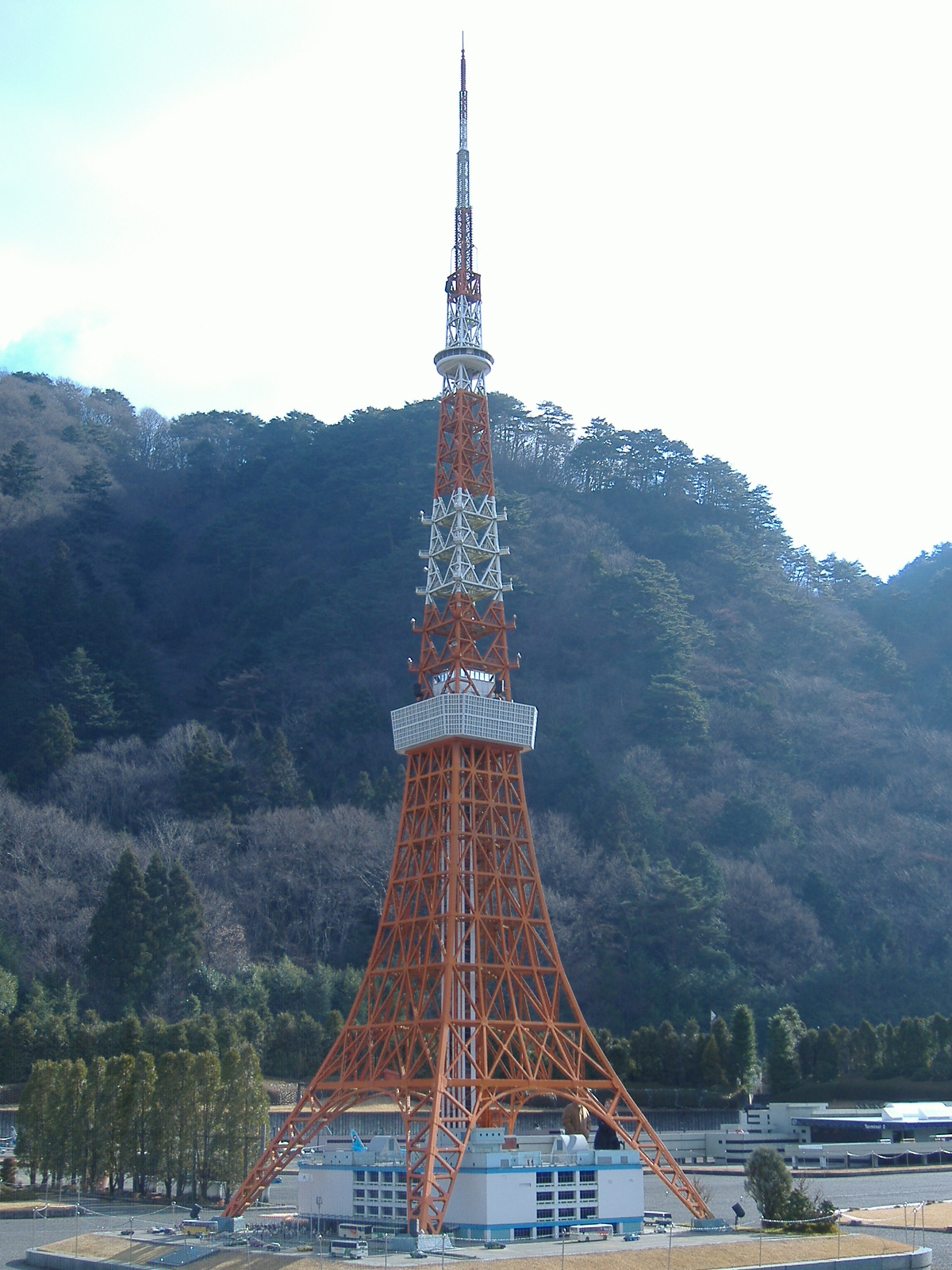
Tokyo Tower

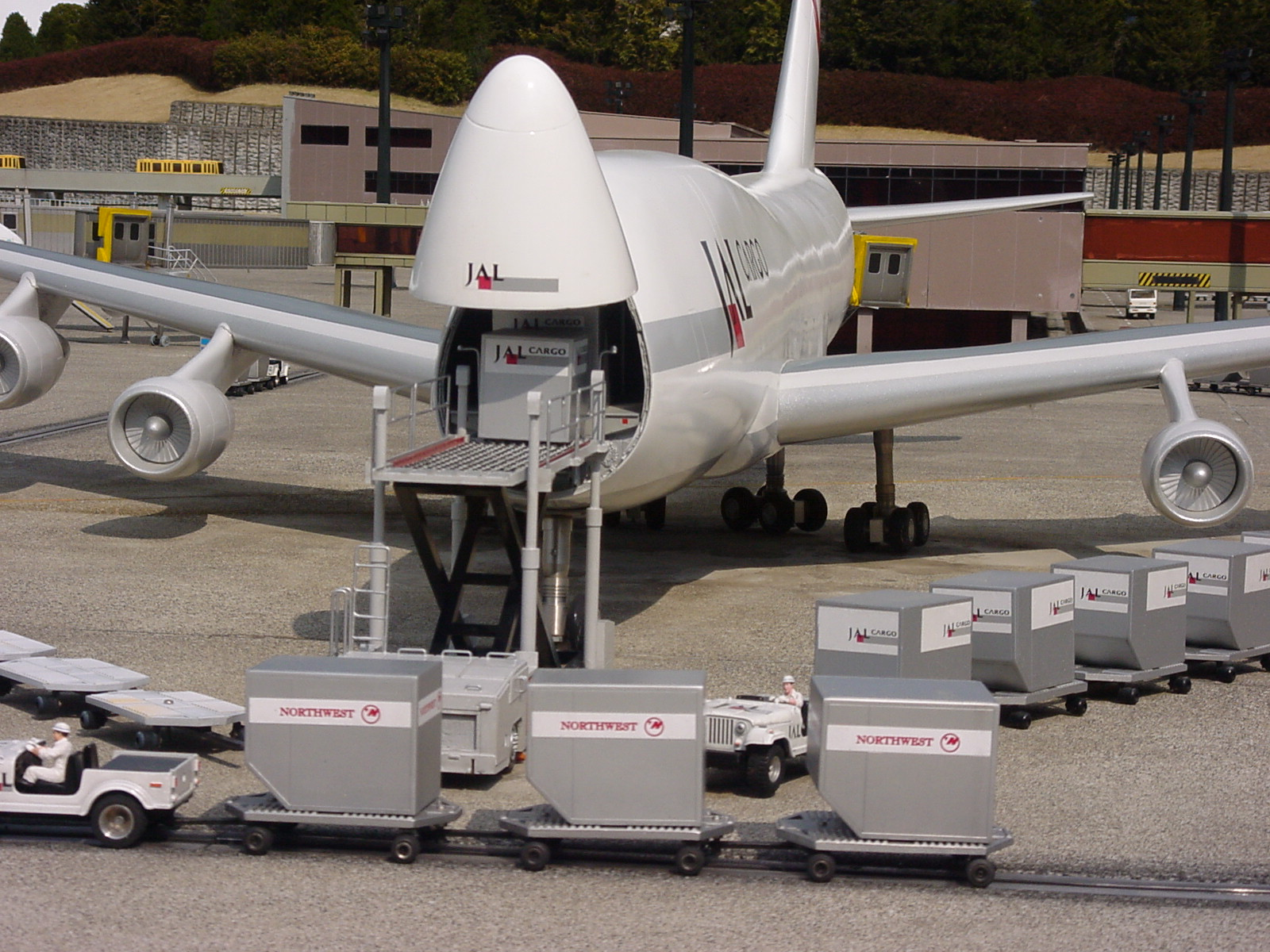
Narita International Airport

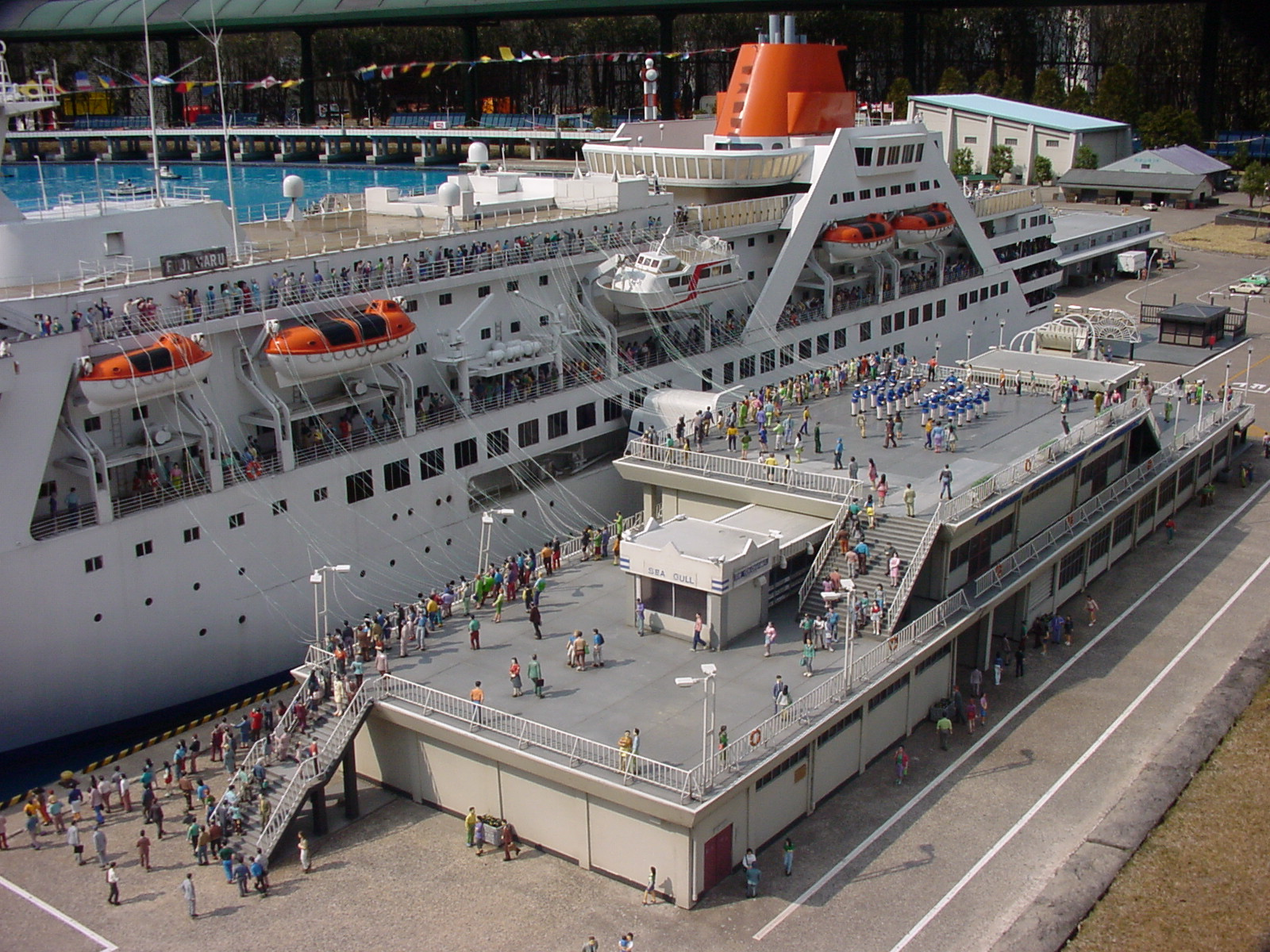
Fujimaru (passenger ship)

=== America Zone ===
| No. | Exhibits | Country | Age | Remarks |
|---|---|---|---|---|
| 13 | Statue of Liberty | United States | 1886 | Cultural heritage. |
| 14 | City Pier A | United States | Late 19th century | |
| 14 | Plaza Hotel | United States | 1907 | |
| 14 | Grand Army Plaza | United States | 1867 | |
| 15 | World Trade Center | United States | 1973 | Destroyed by the September 11 attacks in 2001. |
| 15 | American Standard Building | United States | 1924 | |
| 16 | Empire State Building | United States | 1931 | |
| 17 | Chrysler Building | United States | 1930 | |
| 17 | Central Park | United States | 1876 | |
| 18 | Flatiron Building | United States | 1902 | |
| 18 | Harlem, New York City | United States | – | |
| 19 | White House | United States | 1800 | |

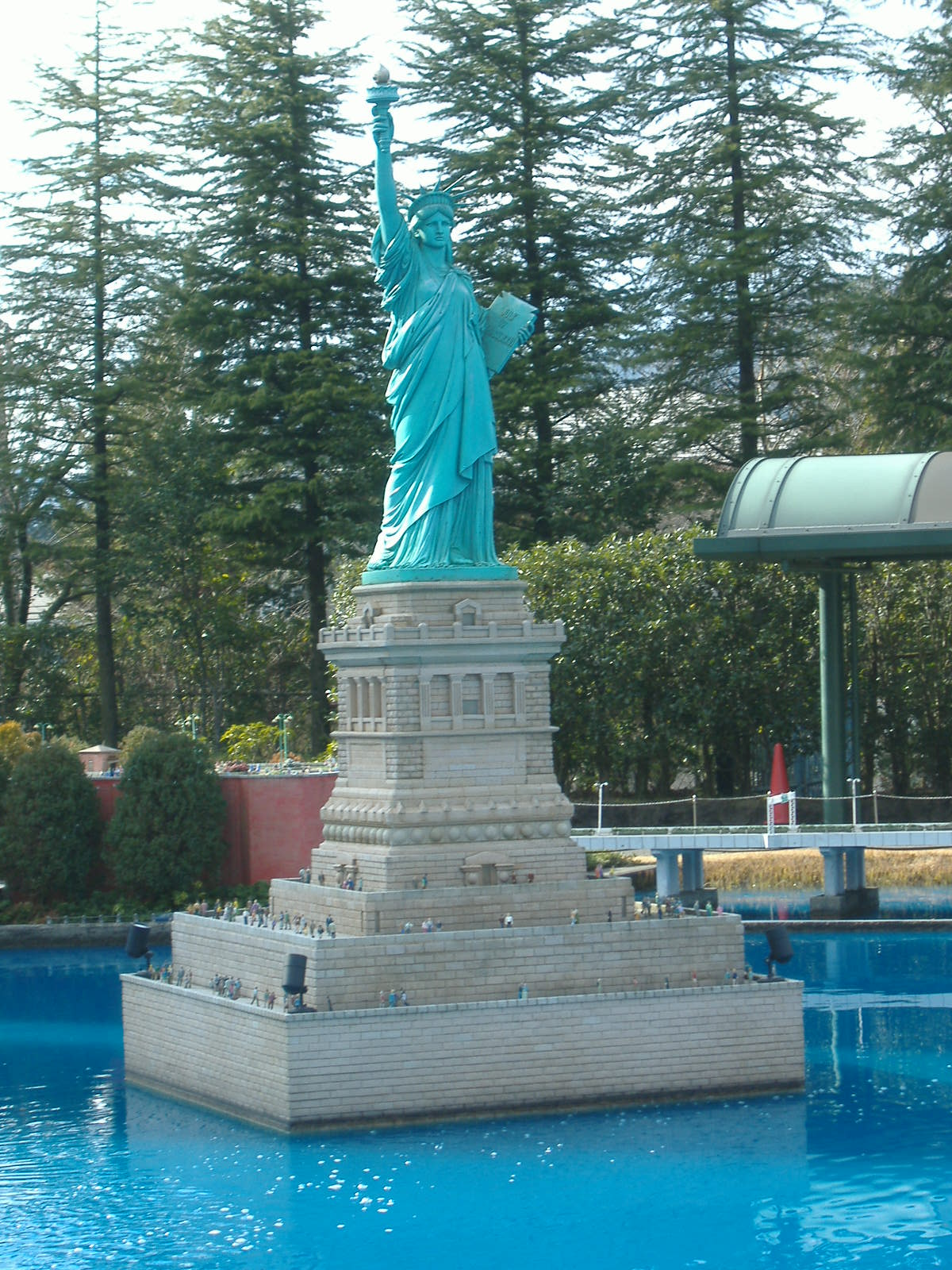
Statue of Liberty

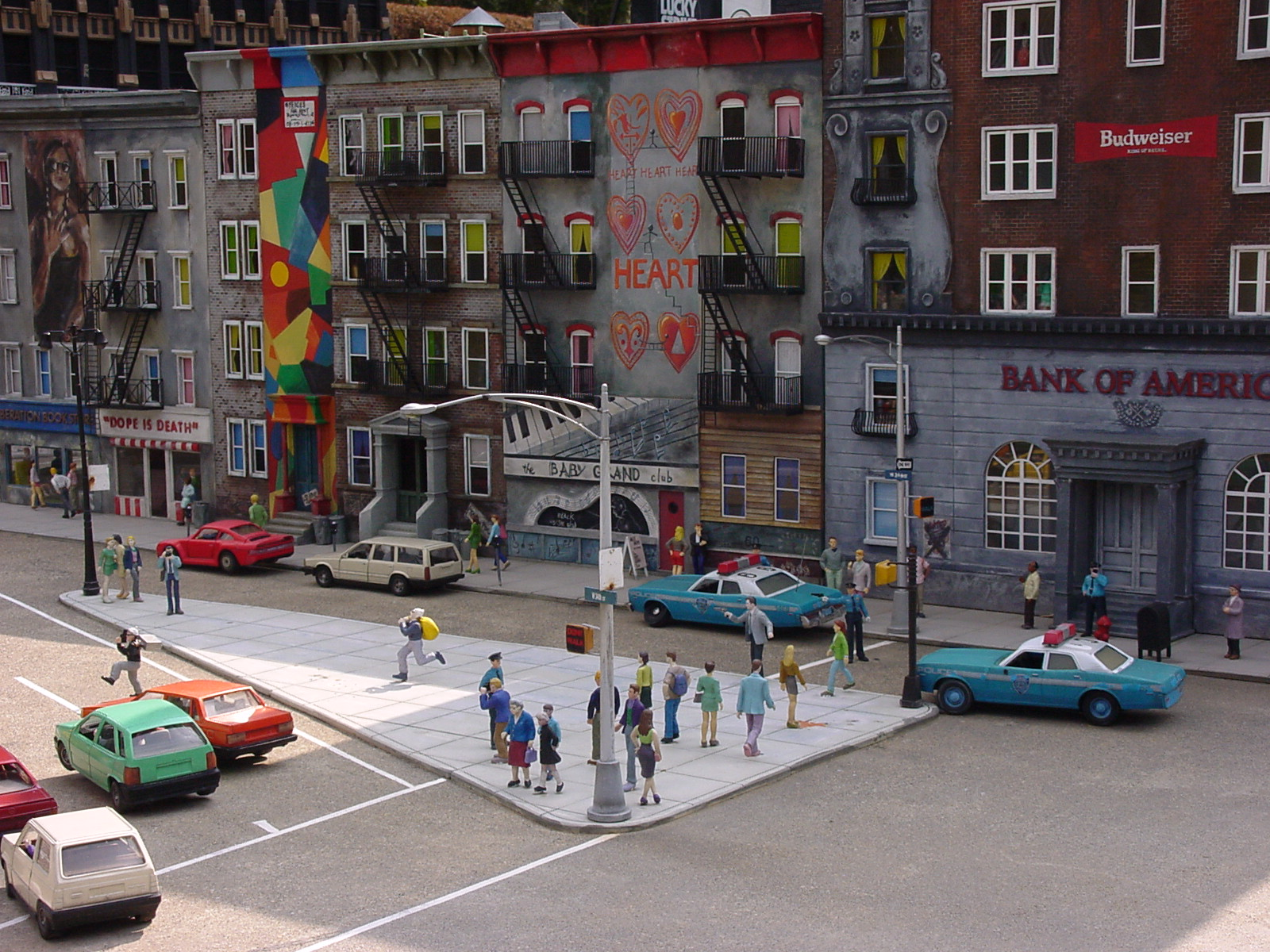
New York robbery

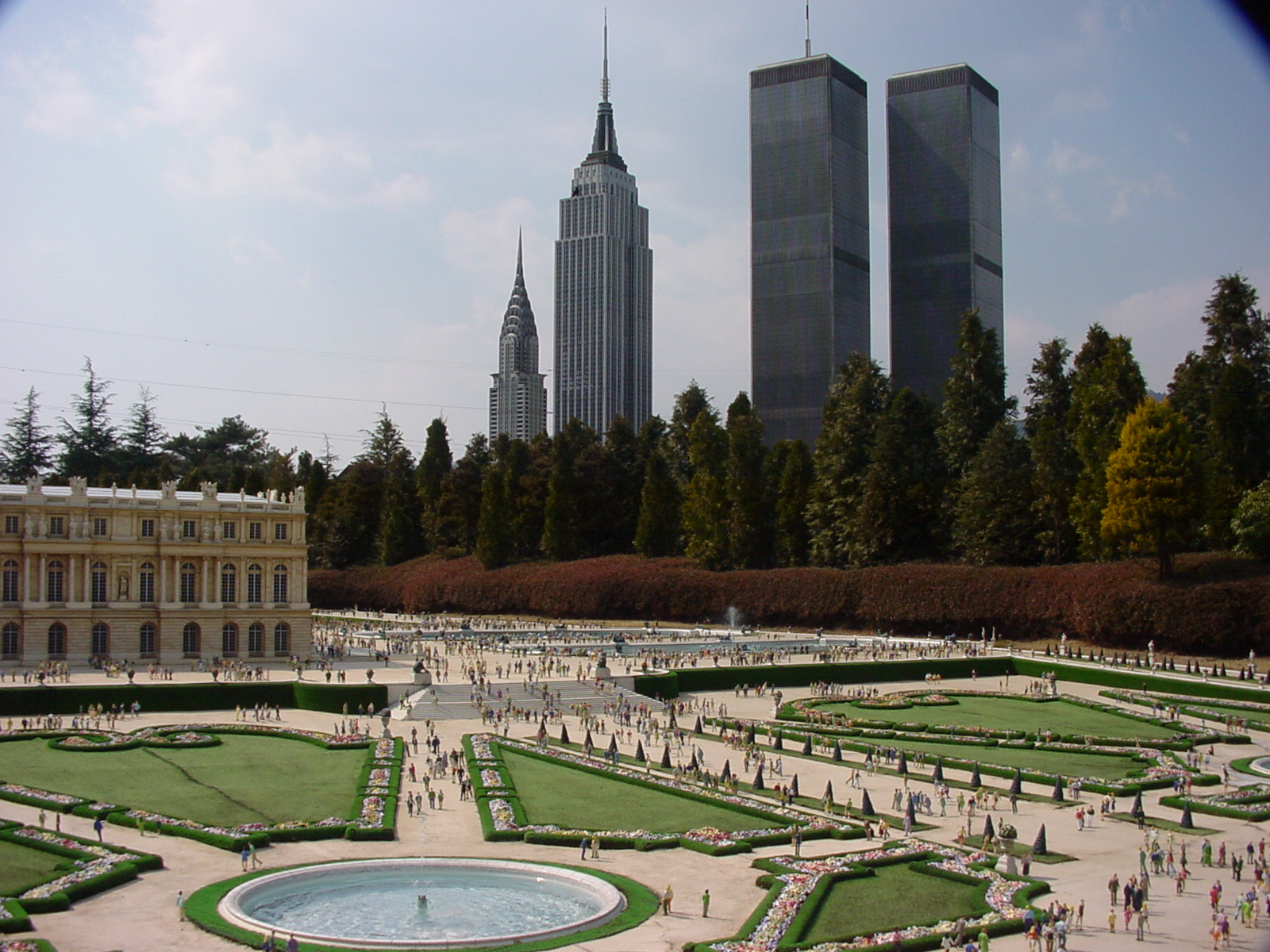
Versailles in front of the World Trade Center

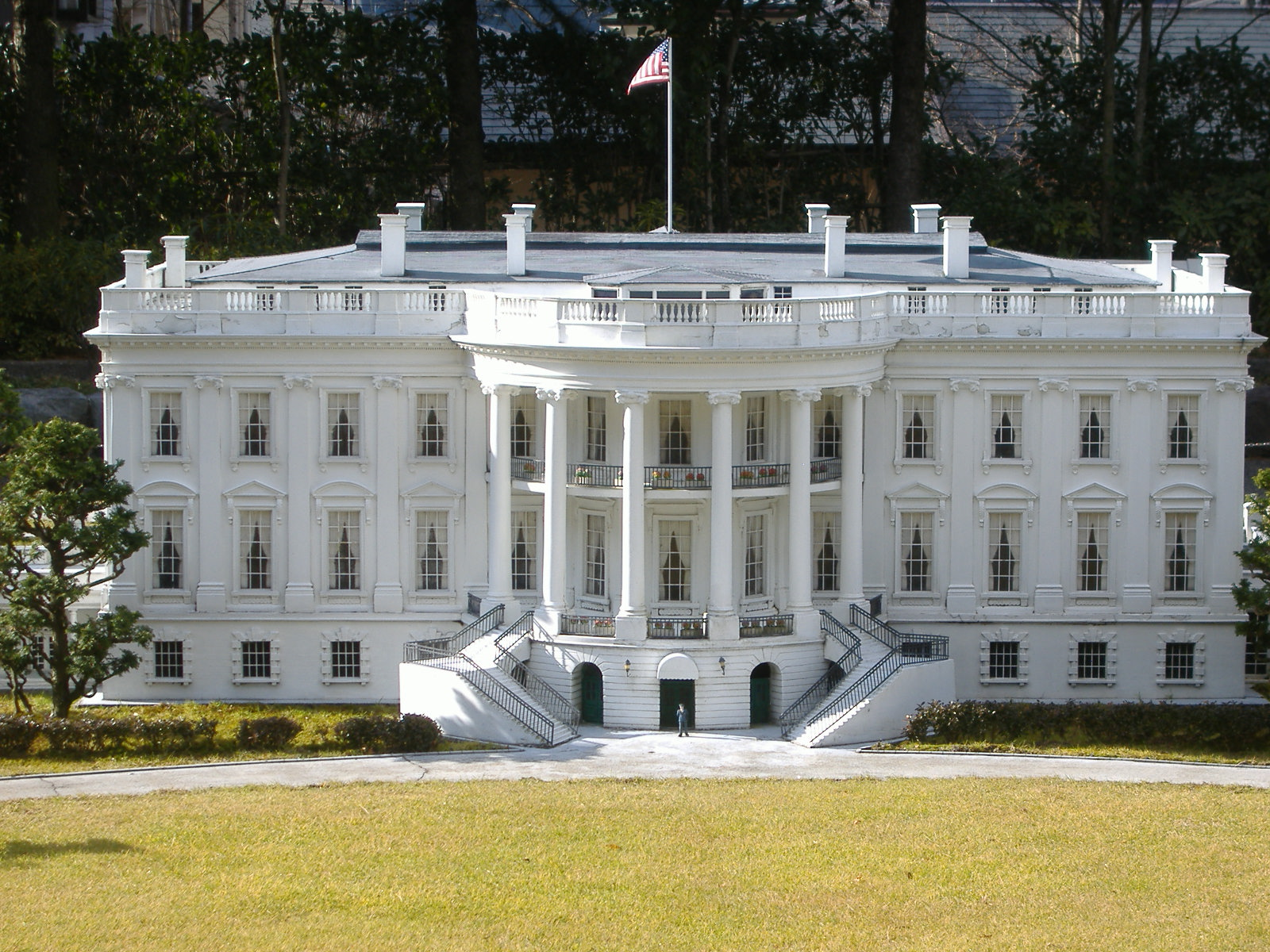
White House

=== Egypt Zone ===
| No. | Exhibits | Country | Age | Remarks |
|---|---|---|---|---|
| 20 | Pyramid of Menkaure | Egypt | Around 26th century BC – 25th century BC | Cultural heritage. |
| 21 | Pyramid of Khafre | Egypt | Around 26th century BC – 25th century BC | Cultural heritage. |
| 22 | Pyramid of Khufu | Egypt | Around 26th century BC – 25th century BC | Cultural heritage. |
| 23 | Great Sphinx of Giza | Egypt | Around 26th century BC – 25th century BC | Cultural heritage. |
| 24 | Abu Simbel temples | Egypt | 13th century BC | Cultural heritage. |

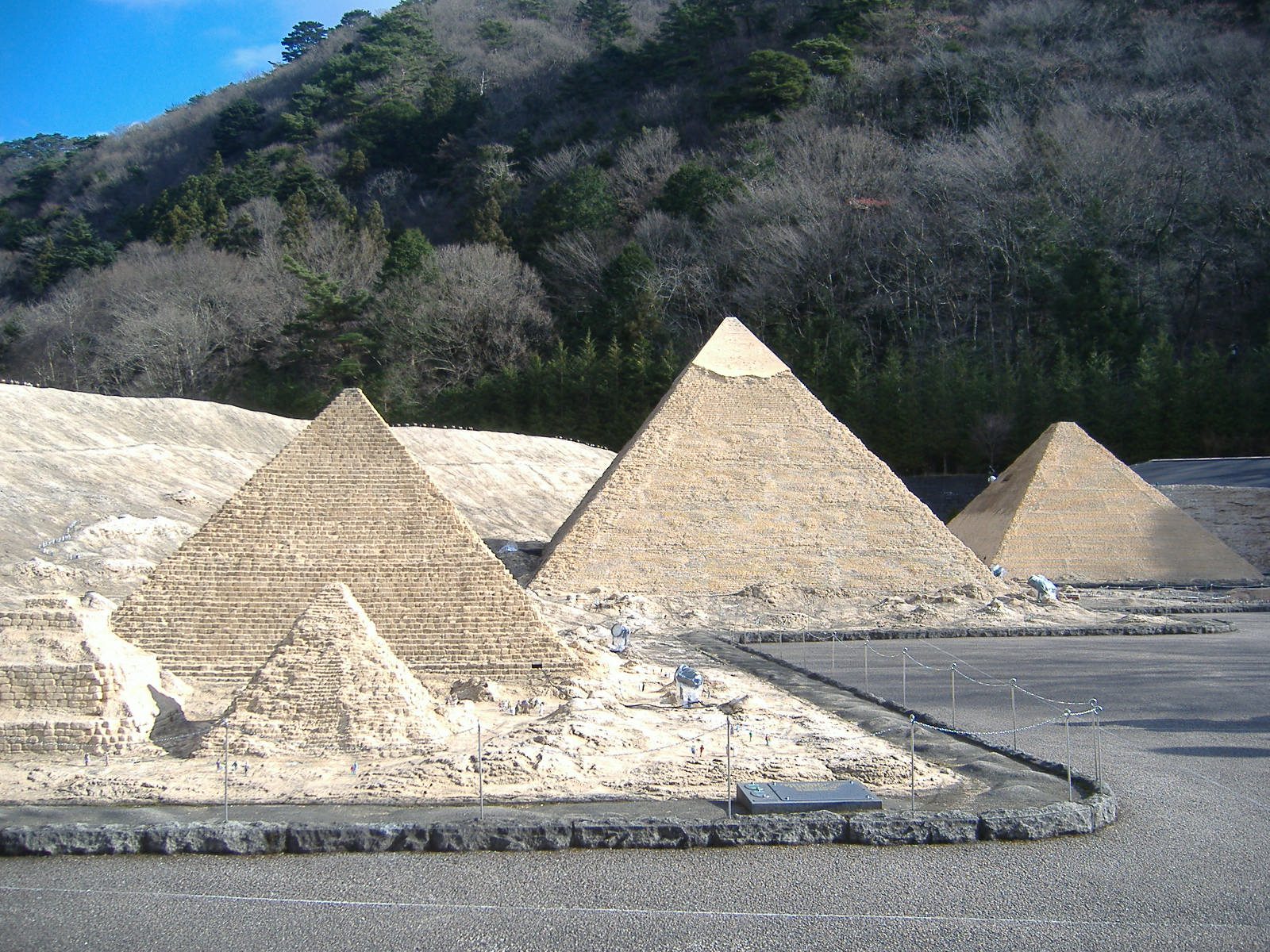
Giza Necropolis

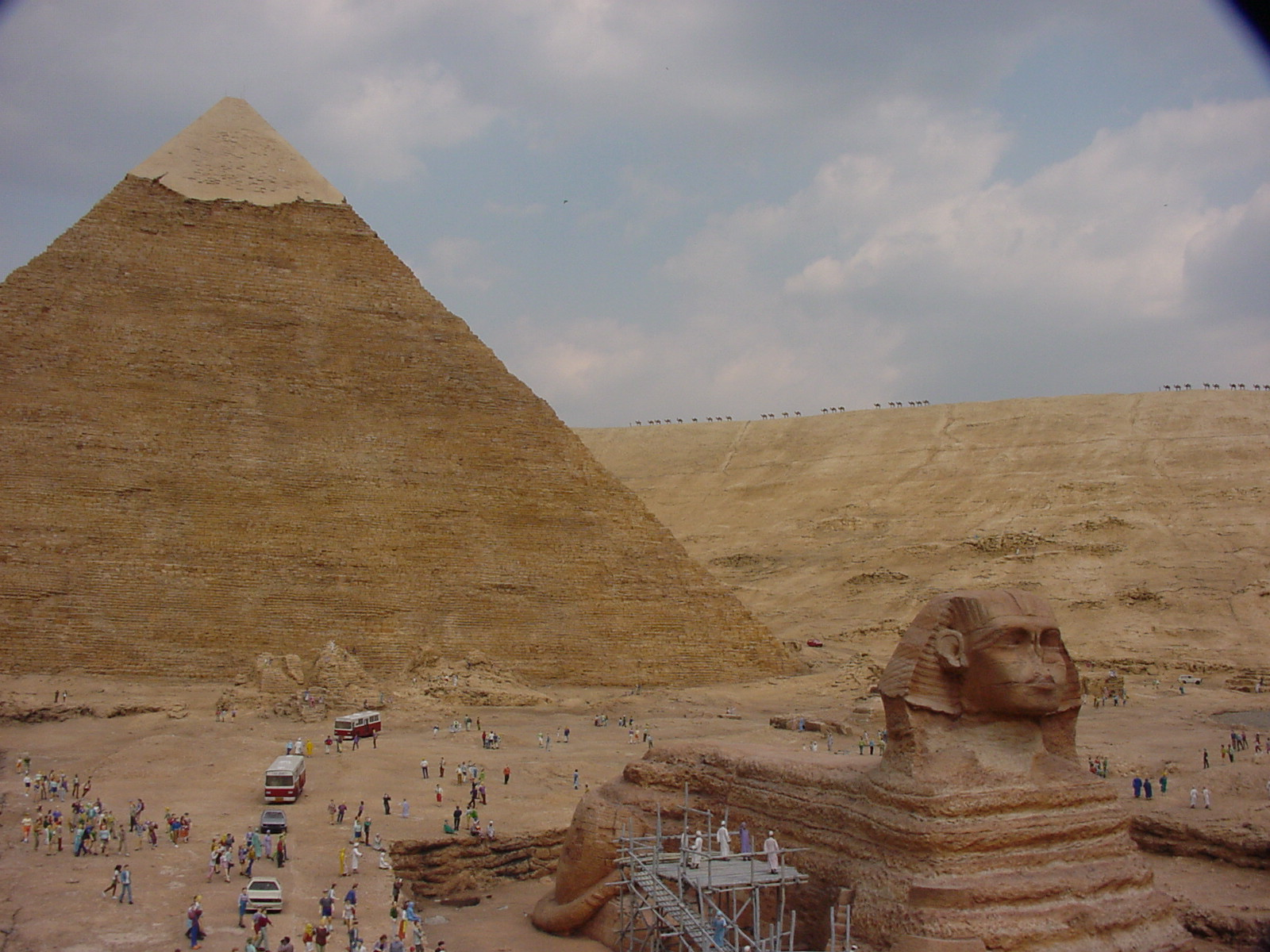
Pyramid of Khafre and the Great Sphinx

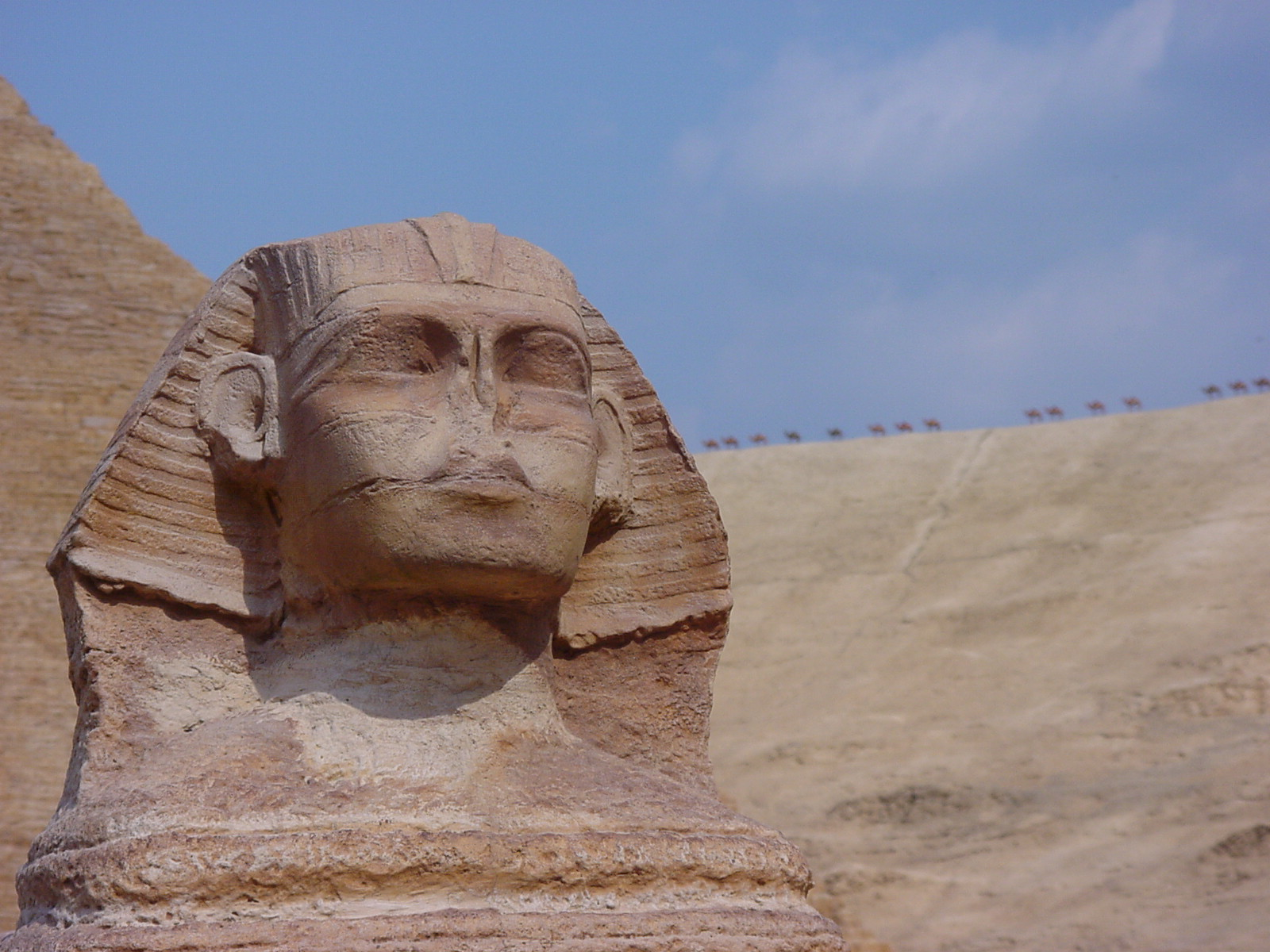
The Great Sphinx and Caravan

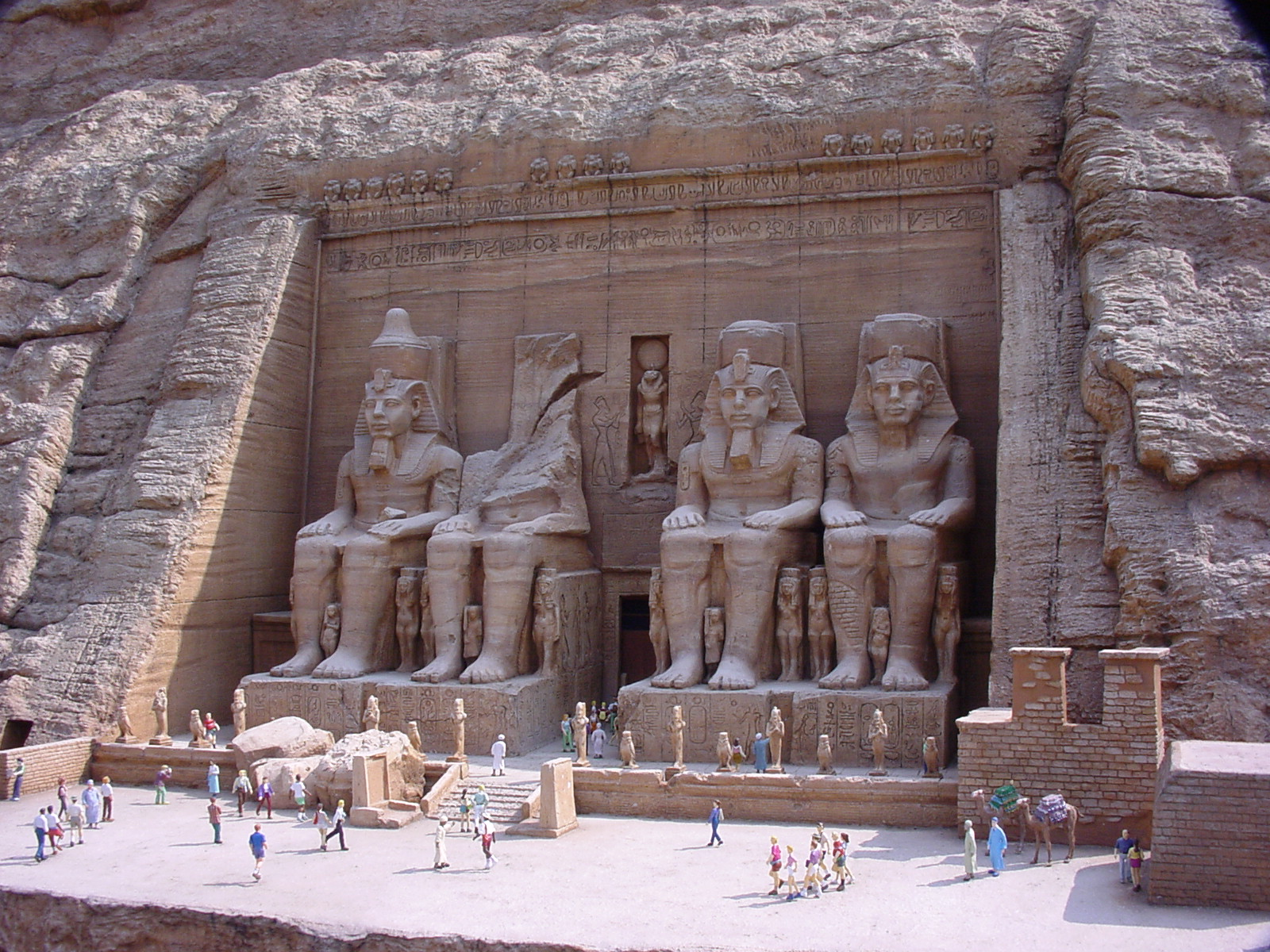
Great Temple of Abu Simbel

=== Europe zone ===
| No. | Exhibits | Country | Age | Remarks |
|---|---|---|---|---|
| 25 | Parthenon | Greece | 5th century BC | Cultural heritage. |
| 26 | Roman Colosseum | Italy | 80 | Cultural heritage. |
| 27 | Leaning Tower of Pisa | Italy | 1372 | Cultural heritage. |
| 28 | St. Peter's Basilica | Vatican City | 1626 | Cultural heritage. |
| 29 | Milan Cathedral | Italy | 1813 | |
| 30 | St Mark's Basilica | Italy | 1090 | Cultural heritage. |
| 31 | Château de Chambord | France | 1547 | Cultural heritage. |
| 32 | Palace of Versailles | France | 1772 | Cultural heritage. |
| 33 | Basilique du Sacré-Cœur | France | 1919 | |
| 34 | Notre Dame de Paris | France | 1225 | Cultural heritage. |
| 35 | Arc de Triomphe | France | 1836 | |
| 36 | Eiffel Tower | France | 1889 | |
| 37 | Belvedere | Austria | 1723 | |
| 38 | Borgund stave church | Norway | Around 12th century | |
| 39 | Peterhof Palace | Russia | 1709 | Cultural heritage. |
| 40 | Saint Basil's Cathedral | Russia | 1560 | Cultural heritage. |
| 41 | Peace Palace | Netherlands | 1913 | |
| 42 | Magere Brug | Netherlands | 1772 | |
| 43 | The Windmills at Kinderdijk | Netherlands | Around 18th century – 19th century | Cultural heritage. |
| 44 | The windmill of Zaanse Schans (A) | Netherlands | Around 18th century – 19th century | |
| 45 | The windmill of Zaanse Schans (B) | Netherlands | Around 18th century – 19th century | |
| 46 | Neuschwanstein Castle | Germany | 1886 | |
| 47 | Buckingham Palace | (United Kingdom) Great Britain | 1703 | |
| 48 | Dover Castle | (United Kingdom) Great Britain | Around 12th century | |
| 49 | Tower Bridge | (United Kingdom) Great Britain | 1894 | |
| 50 | Westminster Abbey | (United Kingdom) Great Britain | 1245–1519 | Cultural heritage. |
| 51 | Big Ben and the Palace of Westminster | (United Kingdom) Great Britain | 1836–1868 | Cultural heritage. |
| 52 | Sagrada Família | Spain | 1882 – (Under construction) | Cultural heritage. |
| 53 | Alhambra | Spain | Around 13th century – 15th century | Cultural heritage. |
| 54 | Park Güell | Spain | 1914 | Cultural heritage. |
| 55 | Casa Vicens | Spain | 1888 | Cultural heritage. |
| 56 | Cathedral of Santa Eulalia, Barcelona | Spain | 1058 | |

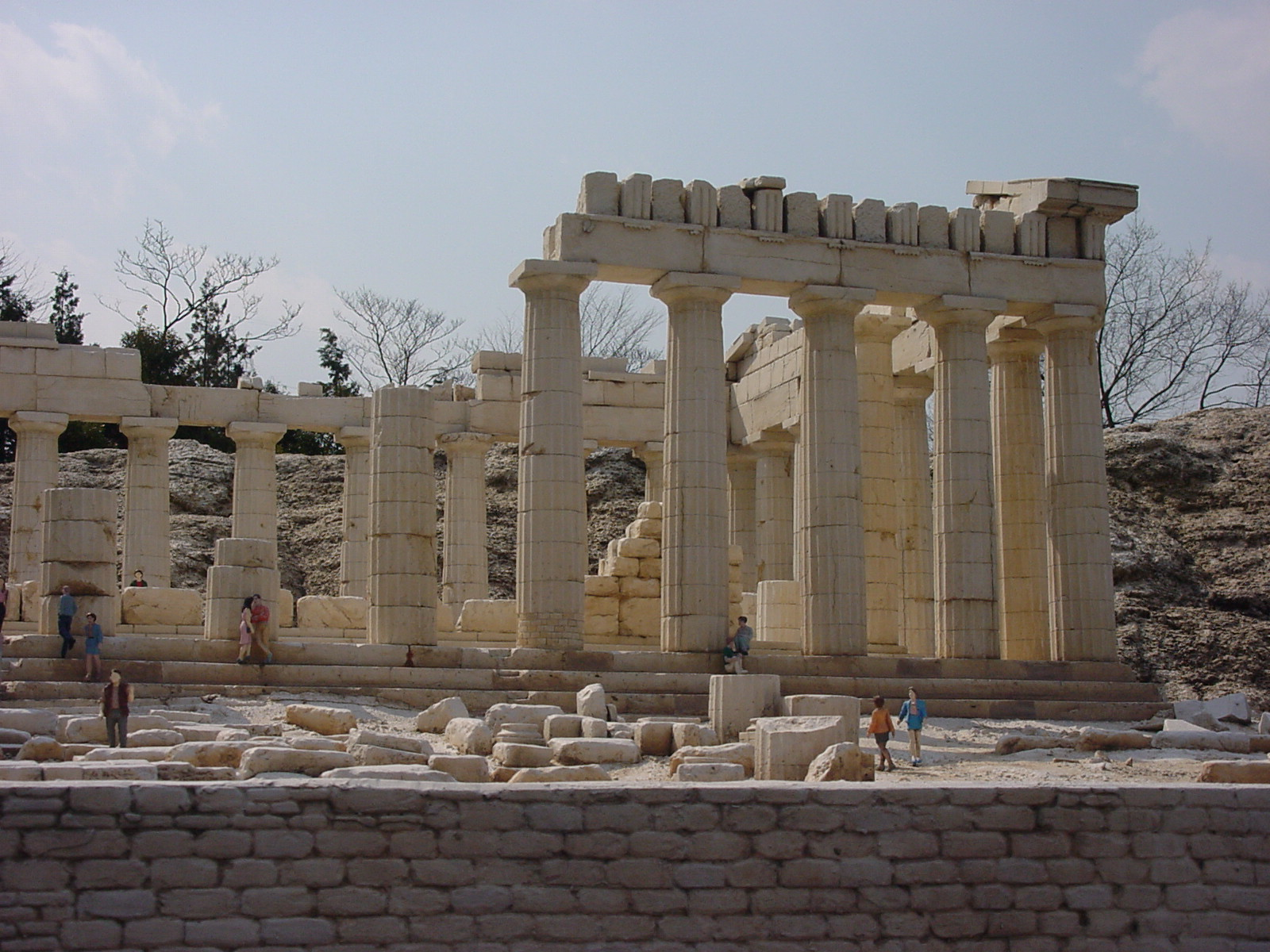
The Parthenon

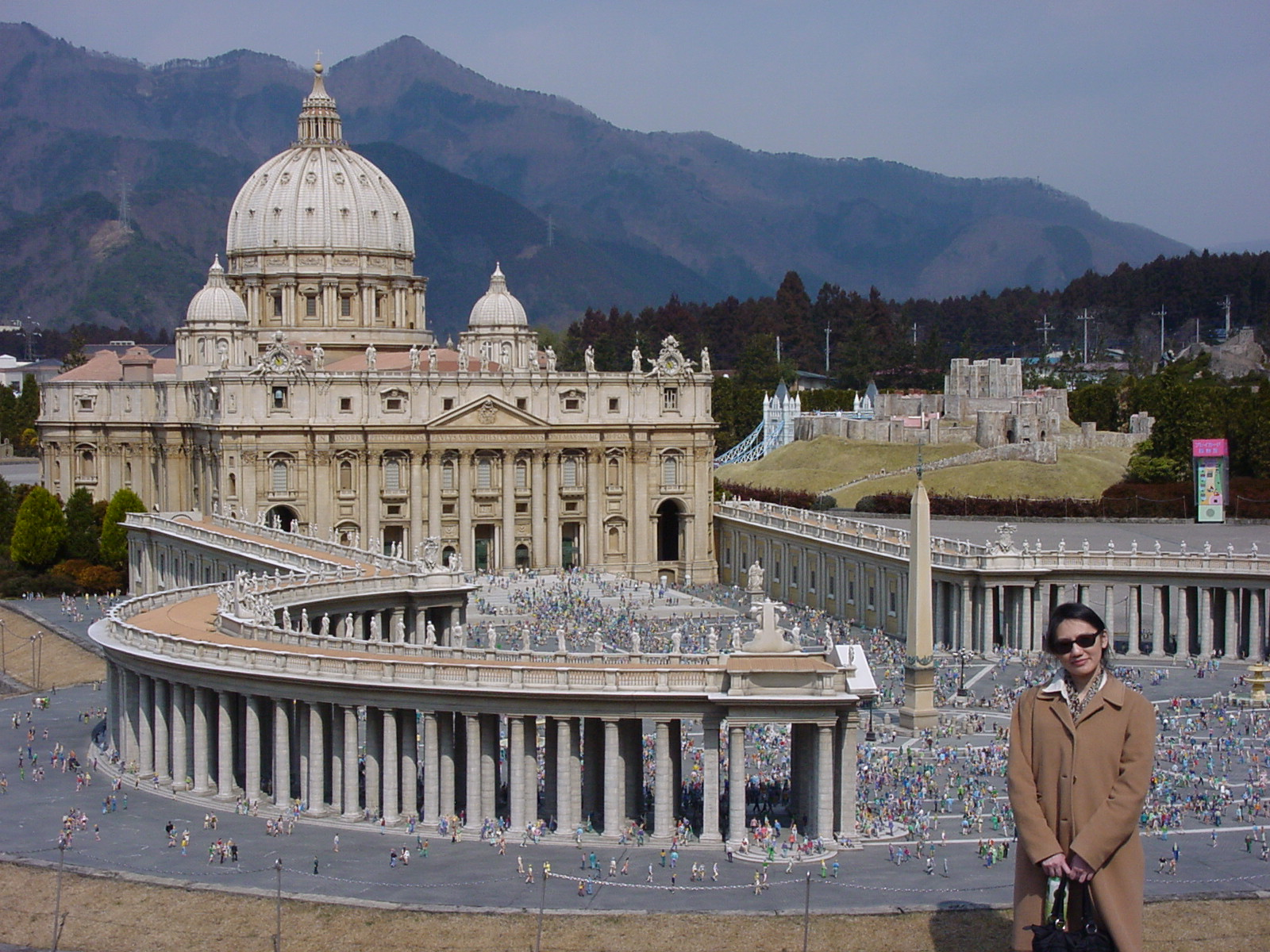
1:25 scale replica of St Peter's Basilica

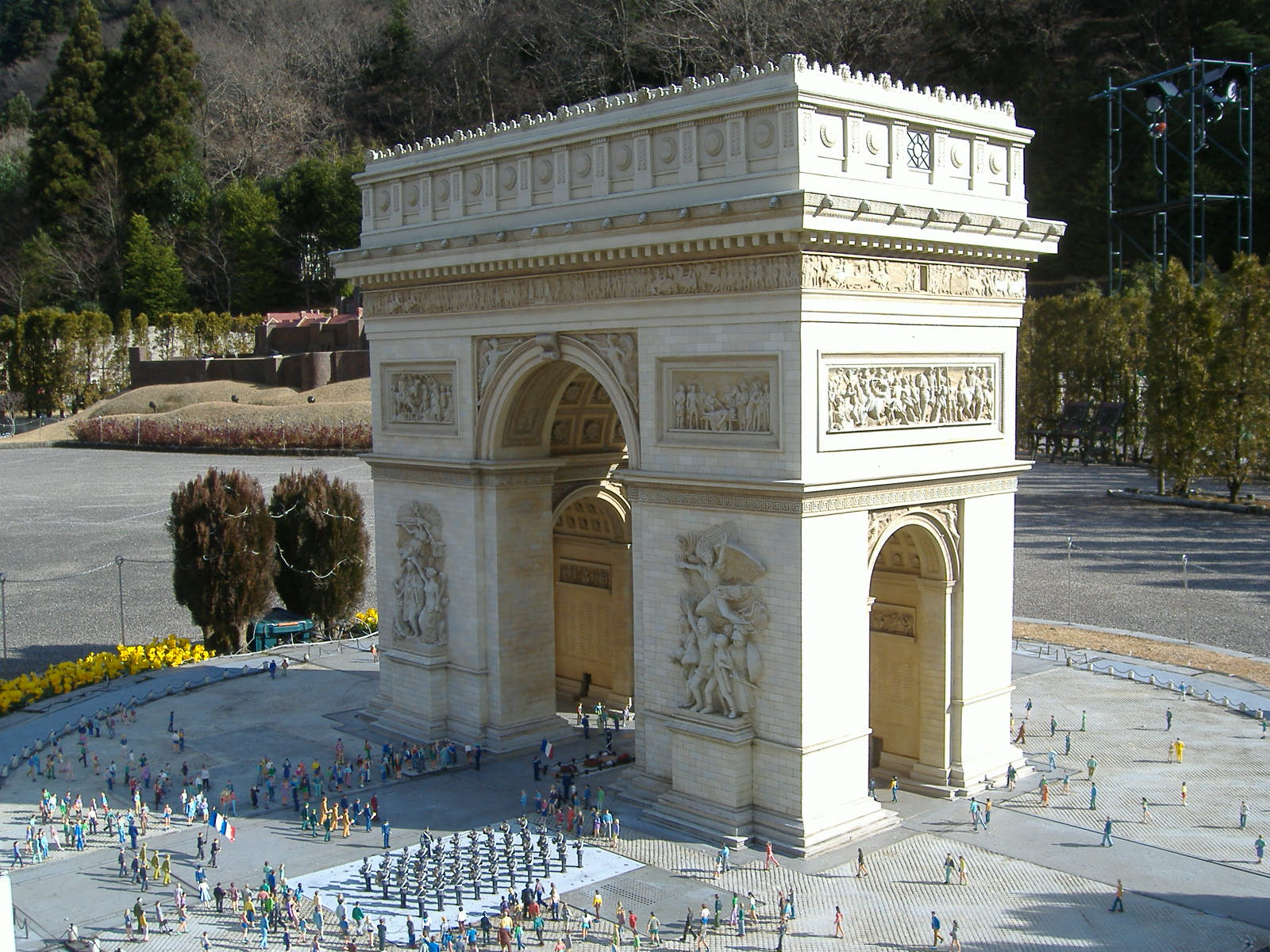
Arc de Triomphe

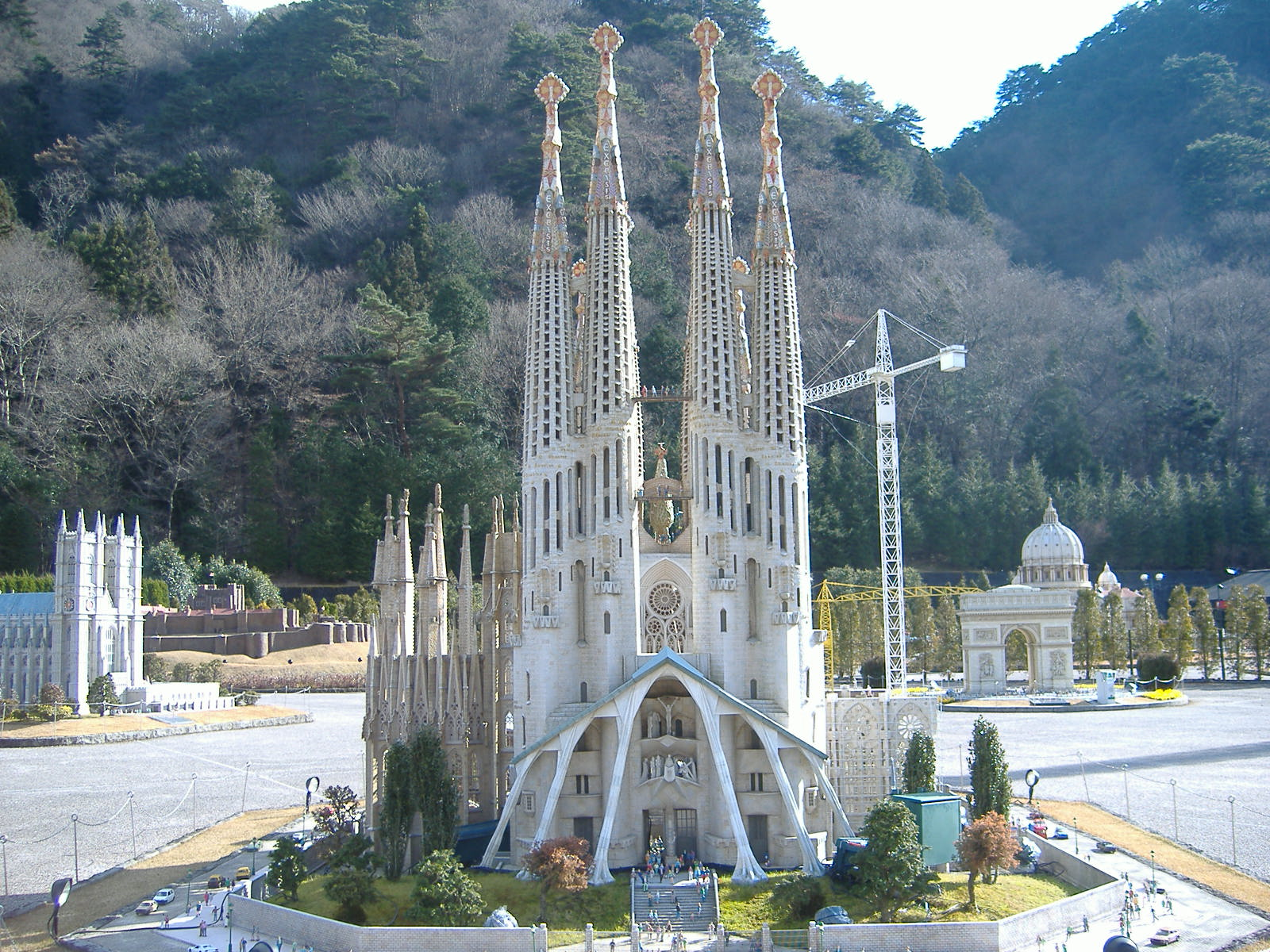
Sagrada Familia

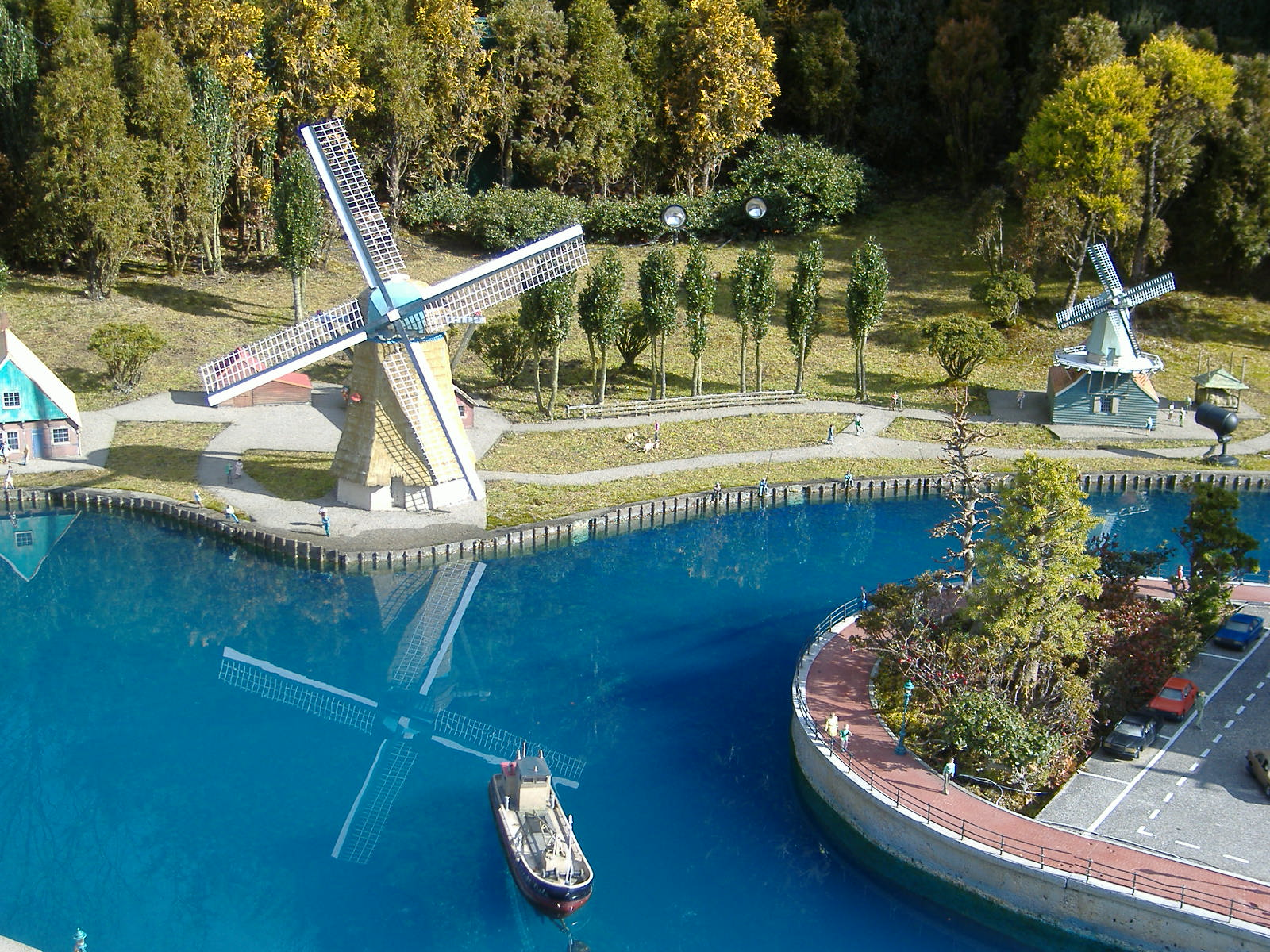
windmill of Kinderdijk (left) and Zaanse Schans (right)

=== Asia zone ===
| No. | Exhibits | Country | Age | Remarks |
|---|---|---|---|---|
| | Wat Arun | Thailand | Before 1656 | Exhibition from July 2019. |
| 57 | Masjed-e Emam, Isfahan | Iran | 1638 | Cultural heritage. |
| 58 | Ananda Temple | Myanmar | Around 1091 | |
| 59 | Angkor Wat | Cambodia | Around 12th century | Cultural heritage. |
| 60 | Taj Mahal | India | 1653 | Cultural heritage. |
| 61 | Forbidden City | China | Around 15th century – 17th century | Cultural heritage. |
| 62 | Temple of Heaven | China | 1420 | Cultural heritage. |
| 63 | Mogao Caves | China | Around 4th century | Cultural heritage. |
| 64 | Yungang Grottoes | China | Late 5th century | Cultural heritage. |
| 65 | Great Wall of China | China | Around 3rd century BC | Cultural heritage. |
| 66-A | Namdaemun | South Korea | 1448 | For reconstruction after being destroyed in the 2008 Namdaemun fire (for completion in 2011). |
| 66-B | Gyeongbokgung | South Korea | 1867 | Exhibition from April 1999. |
| 67-A | Dragon and Tiger Pagodas, Kaohsiung | Taiwan | 1976 | |
| 67-B | Taipei 101 | Taiwan | 2004 | Exhibition from October 2015. |

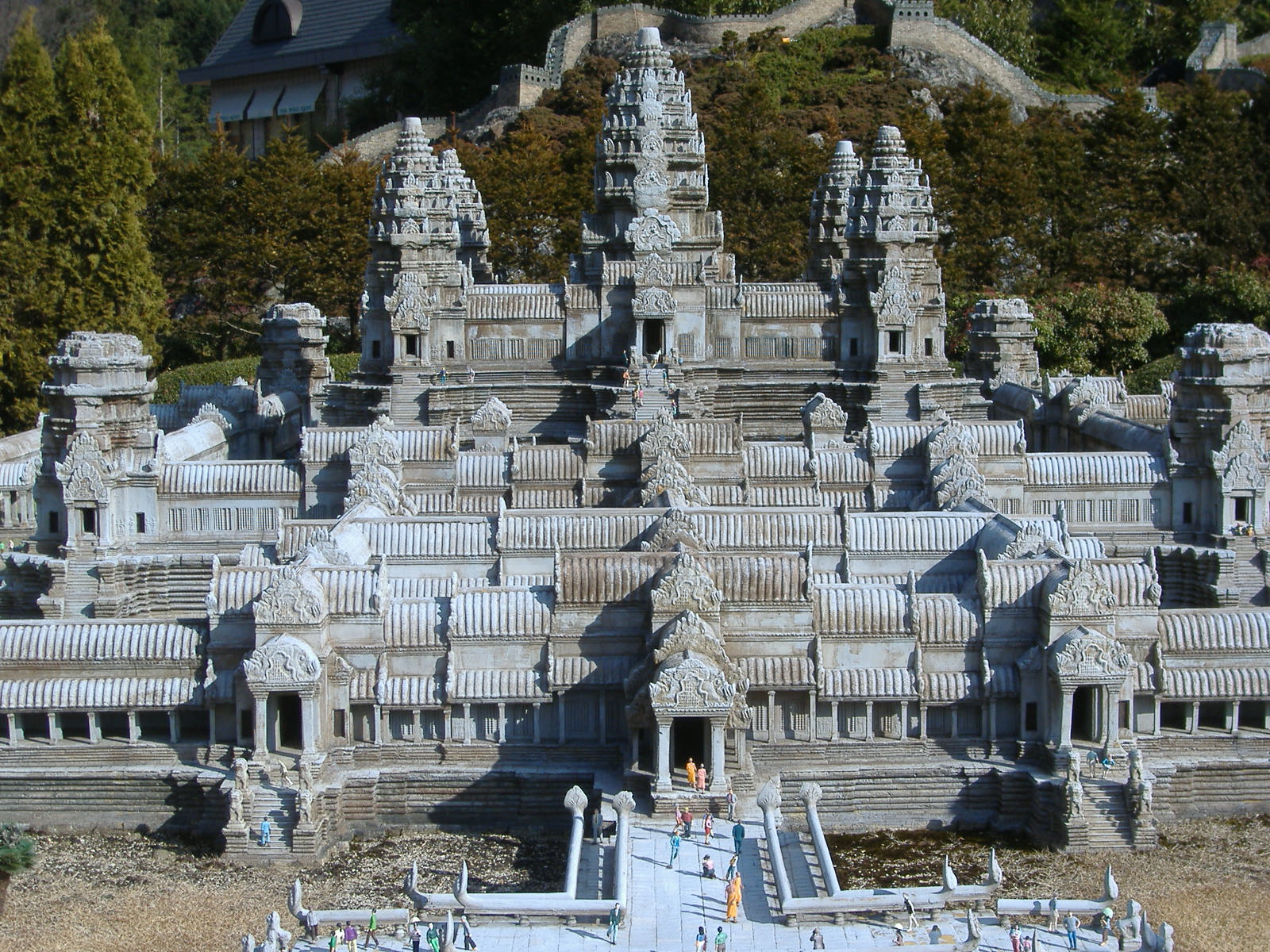
Angkor Wat

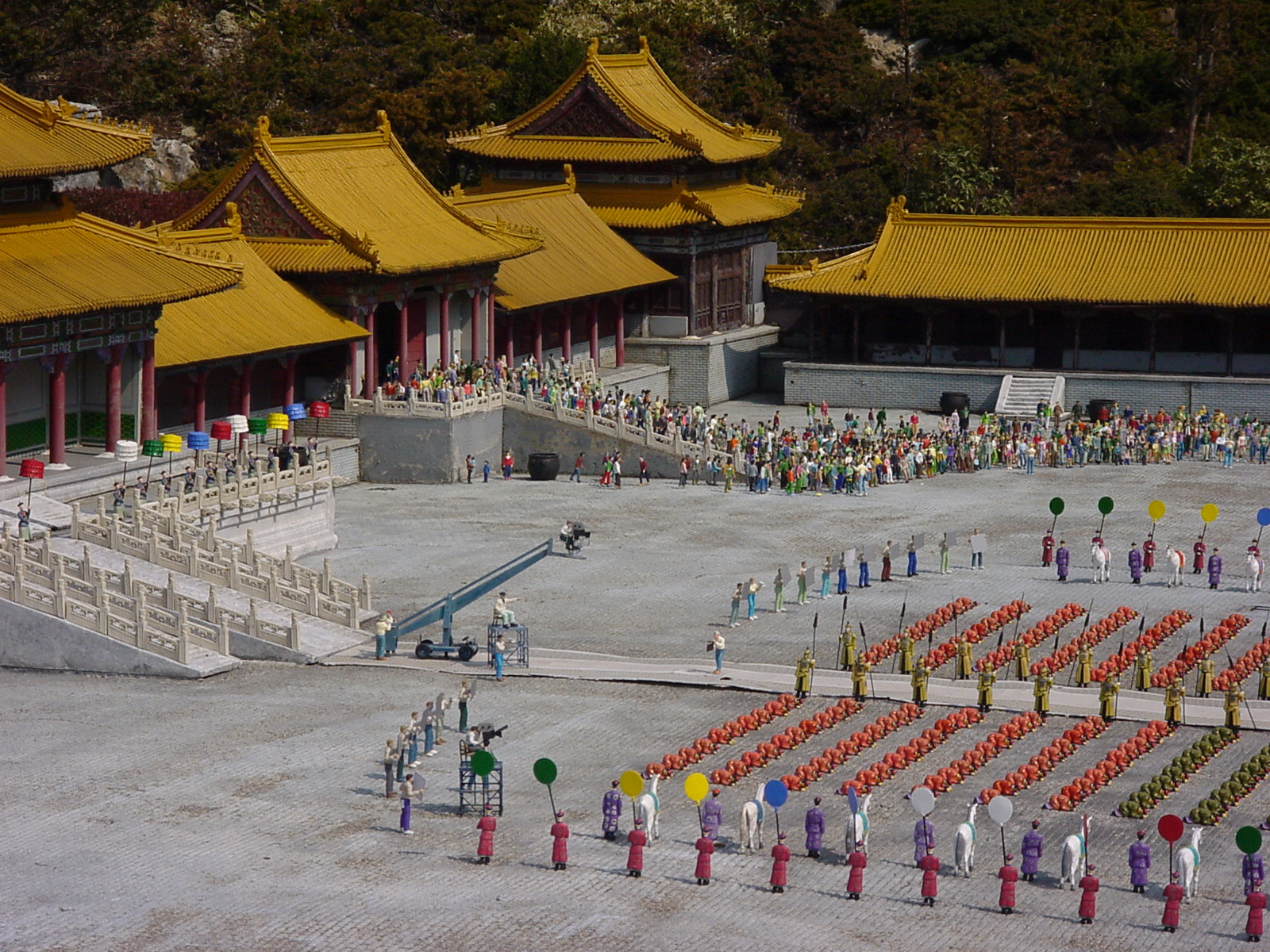
Making of The Last Emperor at the Forbidden City

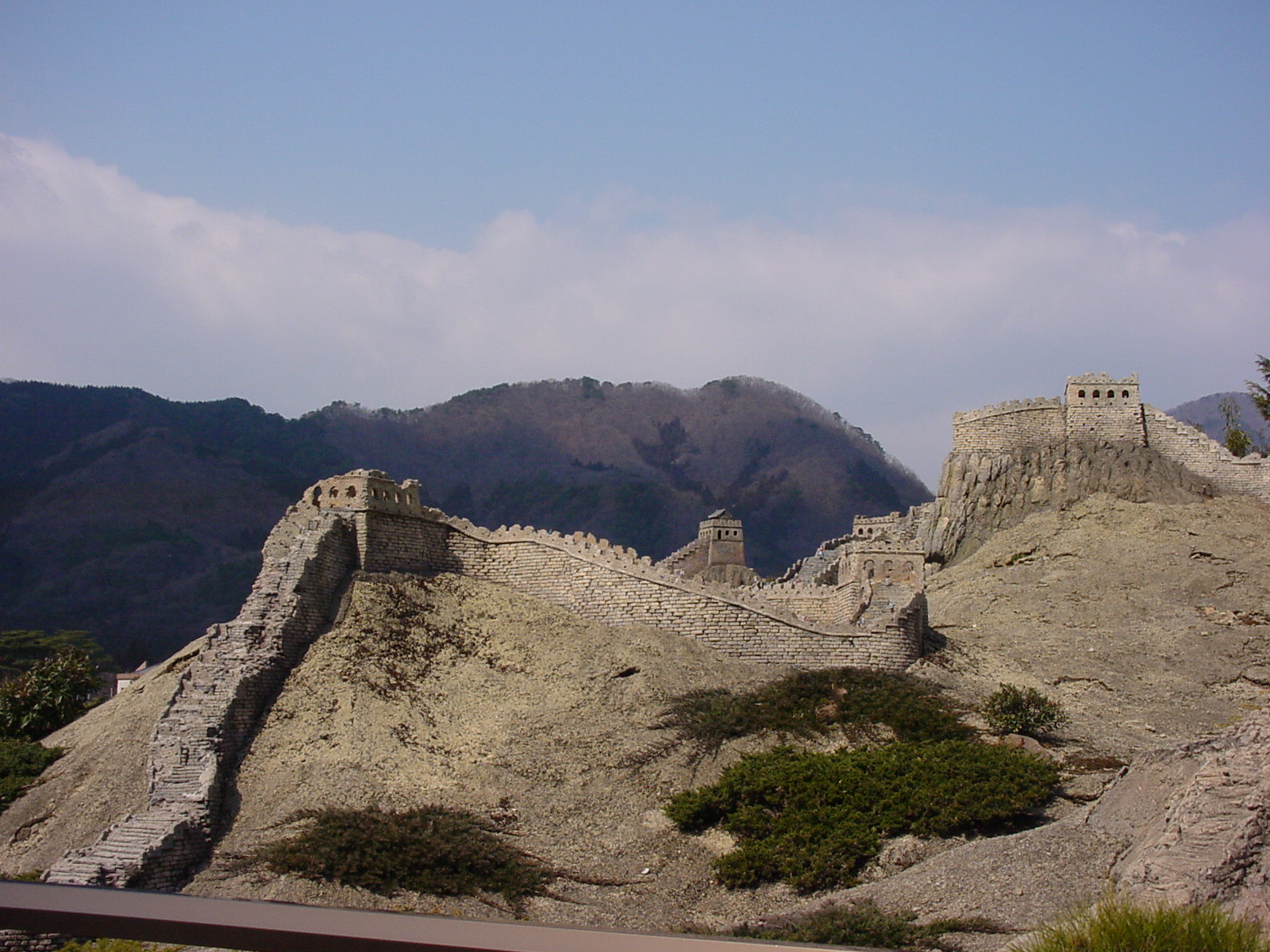
Great Wall of China

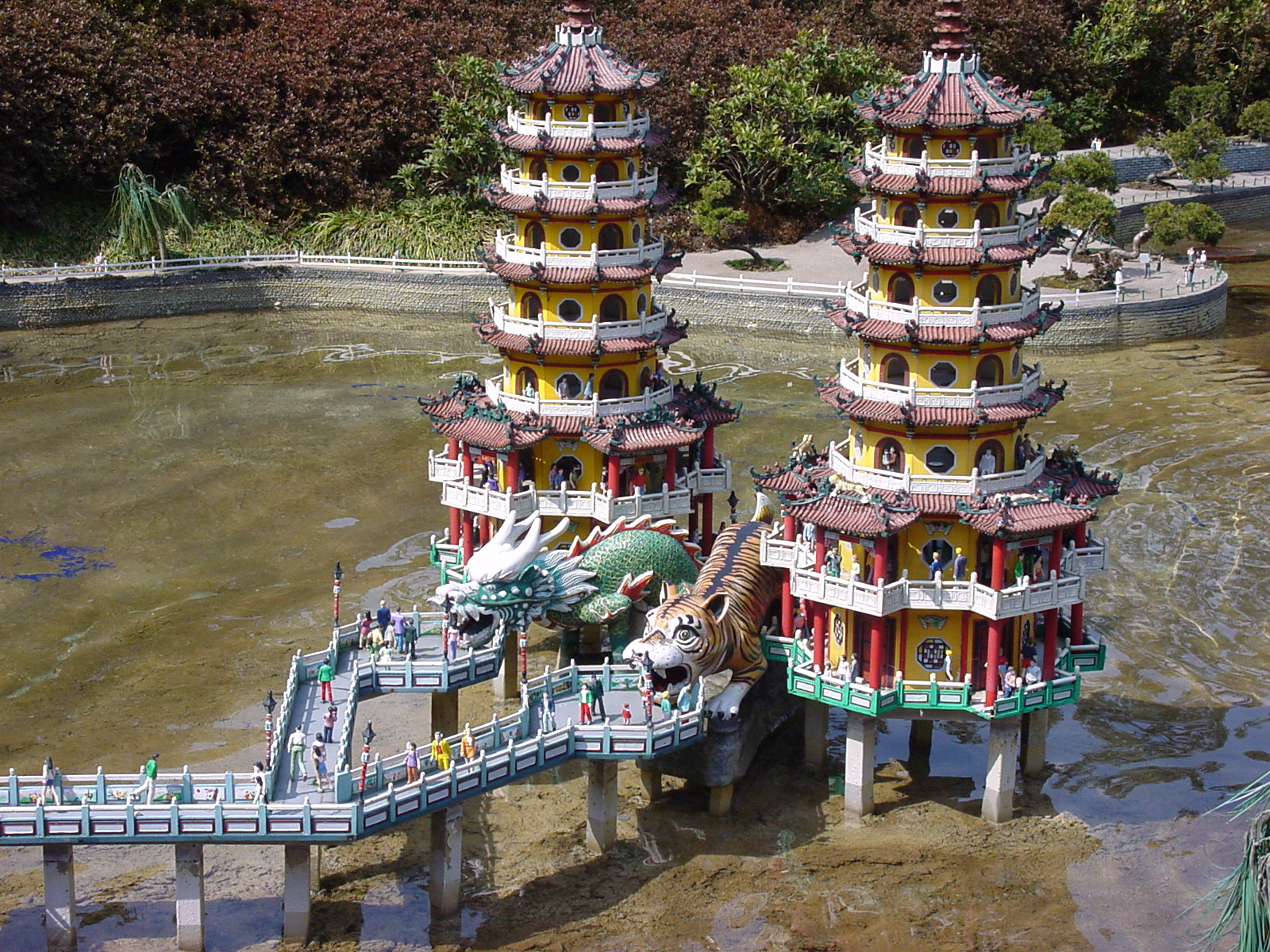
Dragon and Tiger Pagodas, Kaohsiung

=== Japan Zone ===
| No. | Exhibits | Country | Age | Remarks |
|---|---|---|---|---|
| 68 | The pagoda of Ishiyama-dera | Japan | 747 | |
| 69 | Tōshōdai-ji | Japan | 759 | Cultural heritage. |
| 70 | Yakushi-ji | Japan | 680 | Cultural heritage. |
| 71 | Hōryū-ji | Japan | 607 | Cultural heritage. |
| 72 | Kasuga-taisha | Japan | 768 | Cultural heritage. |
| 73 | Ninomaru Palace of Nijō Castle | Japan | 1603 | Cultural heritage. |
| 74 | Kinkaku-ji | Japan | 1397 | Cultural heritage. |
| 75 | Ginkaku-ji | Japan | 1490 | Cultural heritage. |
| 76 | Byōdō-in Phoenix Hall | Japan | 1052 | Cultural heritage. |
| 77 | Kyoto Imperial Palace Shishinden | Japan | Around 13th century | |
| 78 | Katsura Imperial Villa | Japan | Around 17th century | |
| 79 | Kiyomizu-dera | Japan | 778 | Cultural heritage. |
| 80 | The Great Buddha Hall of Tōdai-ji | Japan | Early 8th century | Cultural heritage. |
| 81 | Itsukushima Shrine | Japan | Around 1168 | Cultural heritage. |
| 82 | Himeji Castle | Japan | 1609 | Cultural heritage. |
| 83 | Zuigan-ji | Japan | Around 828 | |
| 84 | The reliquary hall of Engaku-ji | Japan | 1282 | |
| 85 | Kumamoto Castle | Japan | 1607 | |
| 86 | Japanese Four seasons | Japan | Spring (Rice Planting); Summer (Bon Odori); Autumn (Rice reaping); Winter (Dezomeshiki – New Year firefighters' event) | with Tobu Railway's limited express "Spacia", Tobu 10000 series train, a steam locomotive, and a freight train (running). |
| 87 | Multilayer house in Tamugimata, Yamagata | Japan | 1822 | |
| 88 | Residence of a wealthy farmer (The house formerly Sasagawa), Niigata | Japan | 1826 | |
| 89 | Scattered houses in Shōkawa, Toyama | Japan | 1853 | |
| 90 | Gasshō-zukuri house in Shirakawa-gō, Gifu | Japan | Around 17th century – 18th century | Cultural heritage. |
| 91 | Weathercock house, Kobe (Former Mr. Thomas' Residence) | Japan | 20th century | |
| 92 | Yamatomune house (The house of Yoshimura), Osaka | Japan | Early 17th century | |
| 93 | Yatsumune-zukuri house (The house of Toshima), Ehime | Japan | 1758? | |
| 94 | Former Kaichi School | Japan | 1873 | |
| 95 | Main building of Dōgo Onsen | Japan | 1894 | |
| 96 | Ōura Church | Japan | 1864 | Cultural heritage. |
| 97 | The palace formerly Glover, Nagasaki | Japan | 1863 | Cultural heritage. |
| 98 | Dōzaki Church | Japan | 1908 | |
| 99 | Shureimon | Japan | Late 14th century | |
| 100 | Sapporo Clock Tower | Japan | 1878 | |
| 101 | Former Hokkaidō government office building | Japan | 1888 | |
| 102 | Zoological park with amusement park | (Create a model representative of British zoological park) | | |

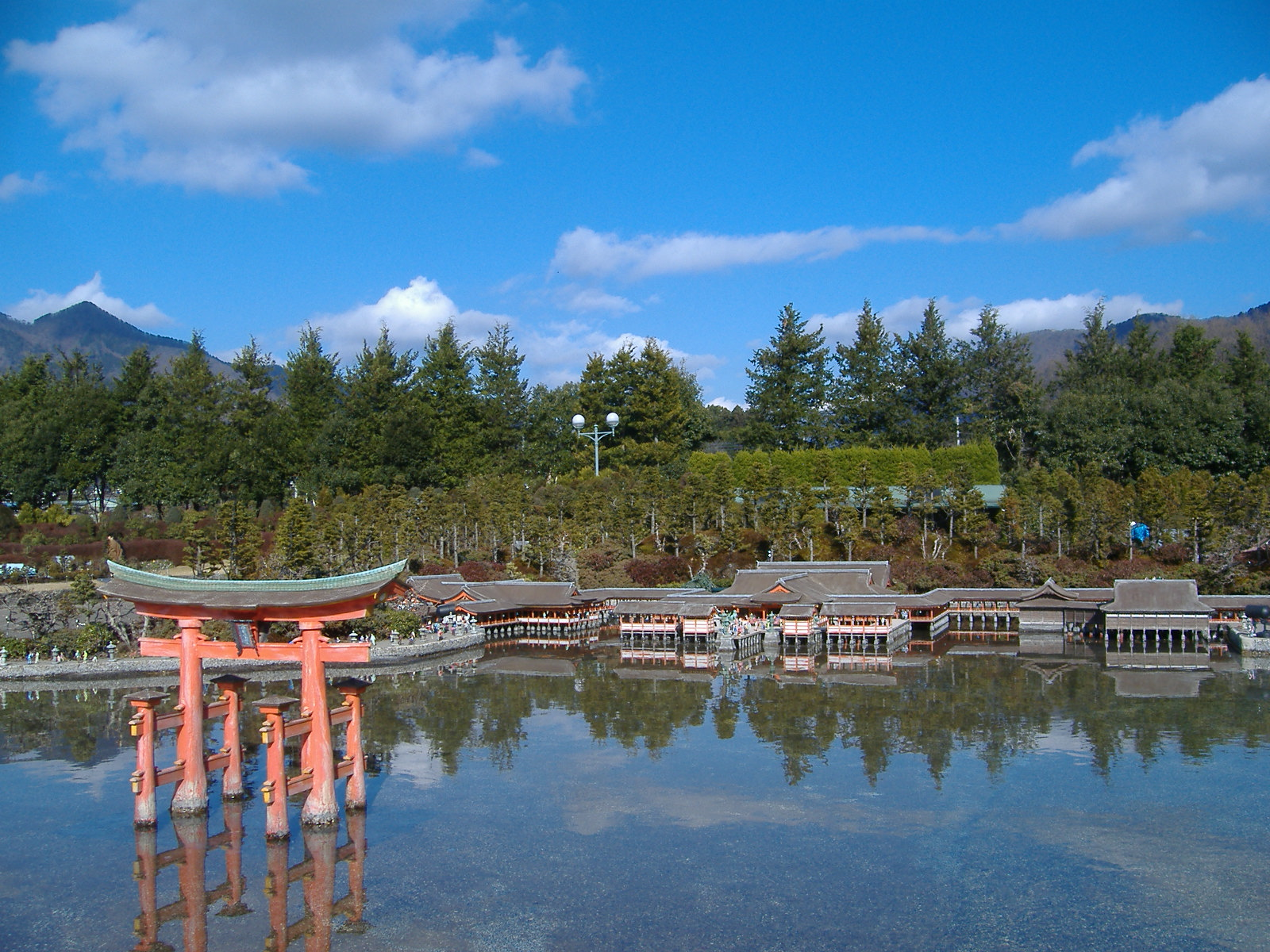
Itsukushima Shrine, Hiroshima

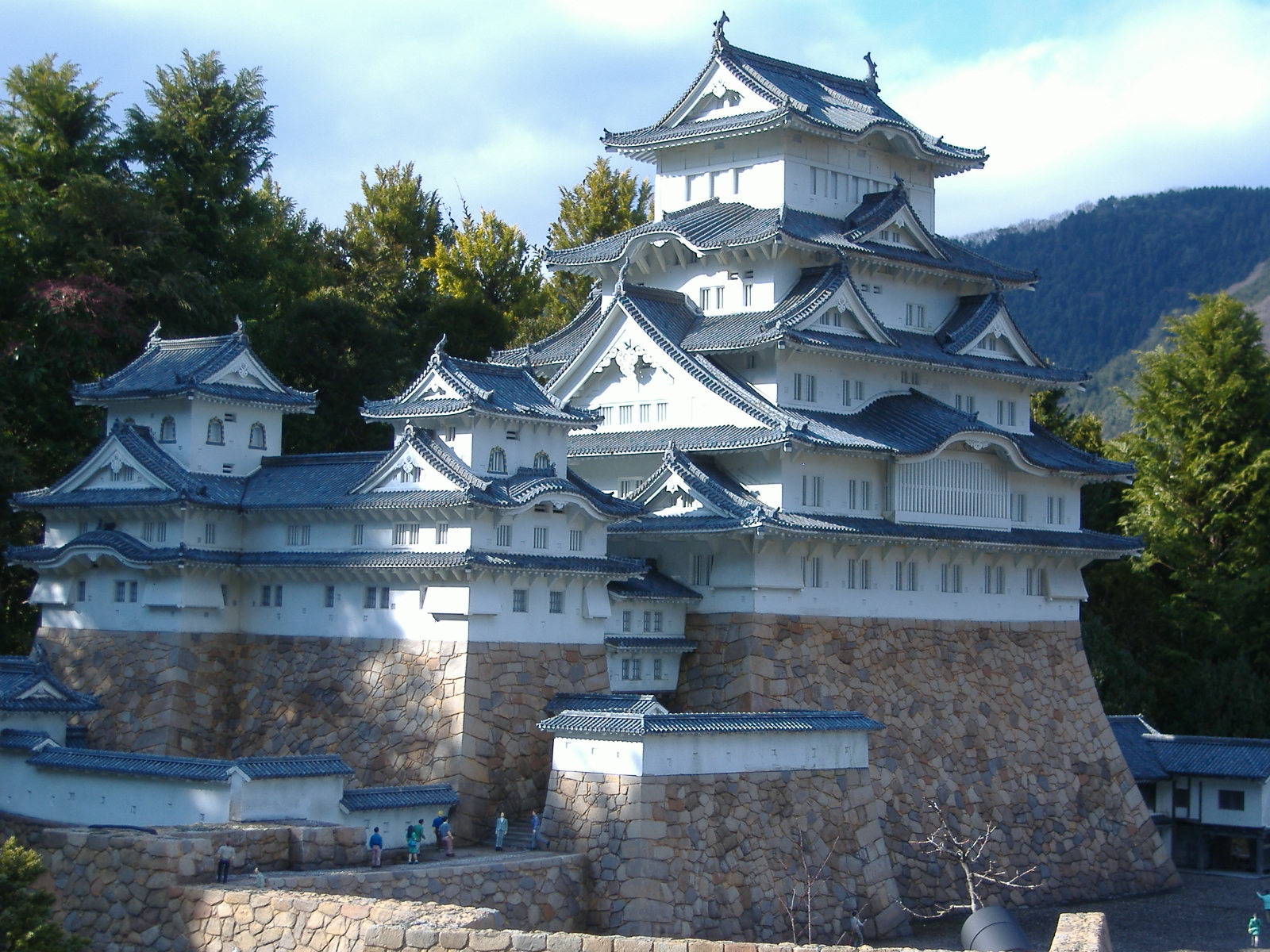
Himeji Castle, Hyogo

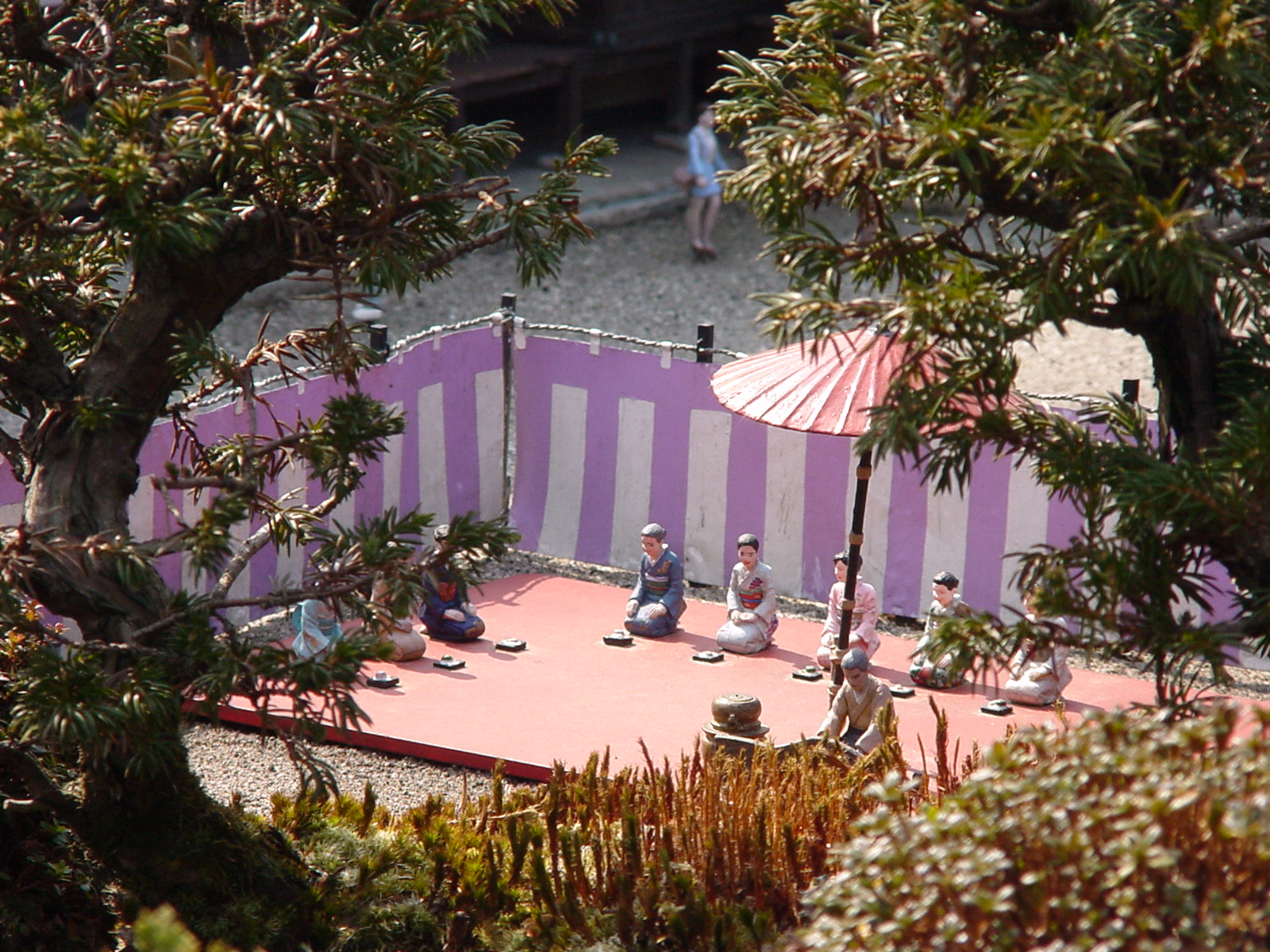
Japanese Tea Ceremony in Nijō Castle, Kyoto

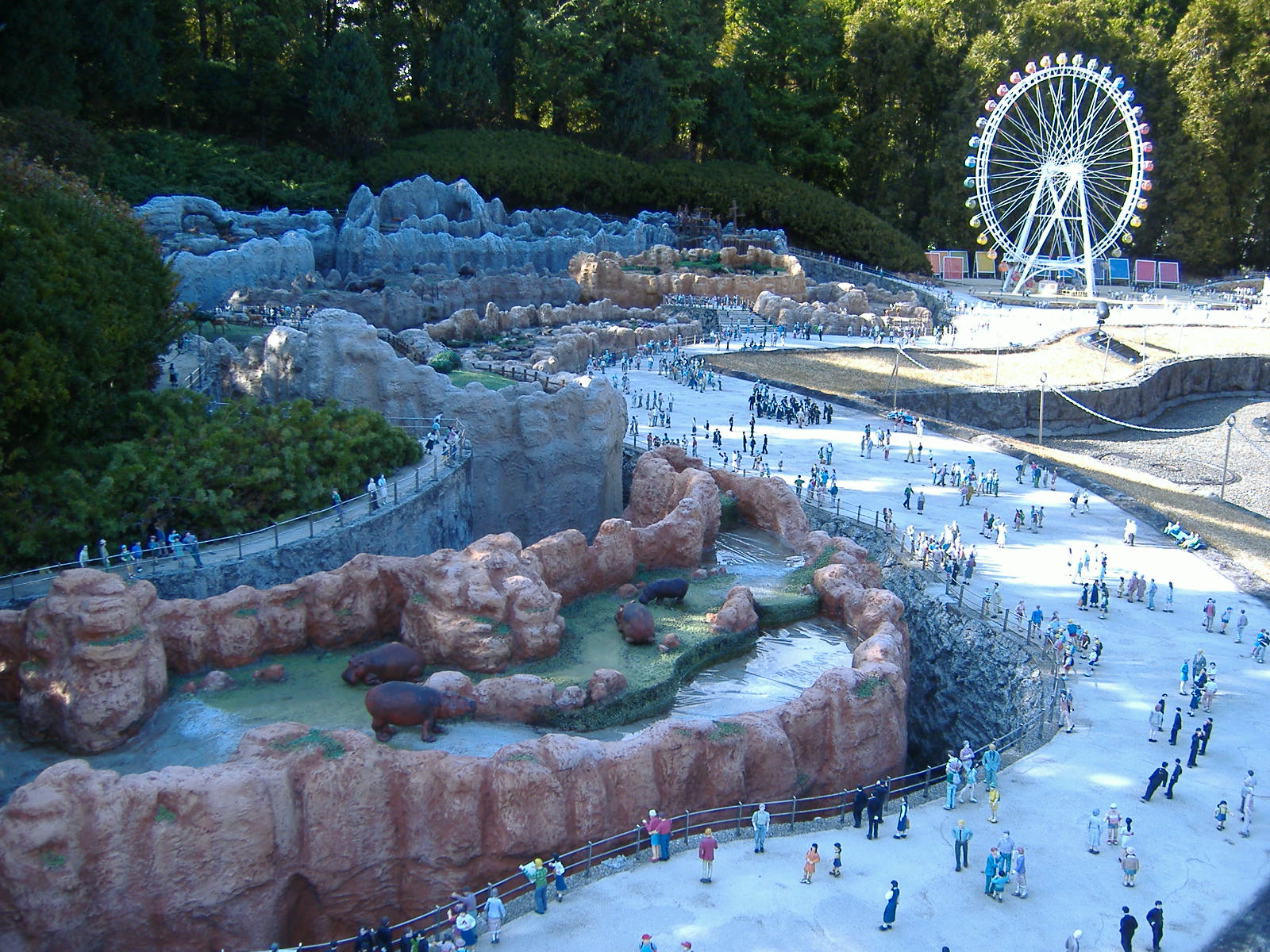
Zoological park (image)
