= Nederwaard Molen No.2 =

One of the 19 windmills of Kinderdjik

Coordinates: 51°53′00″N 4°38′24″E

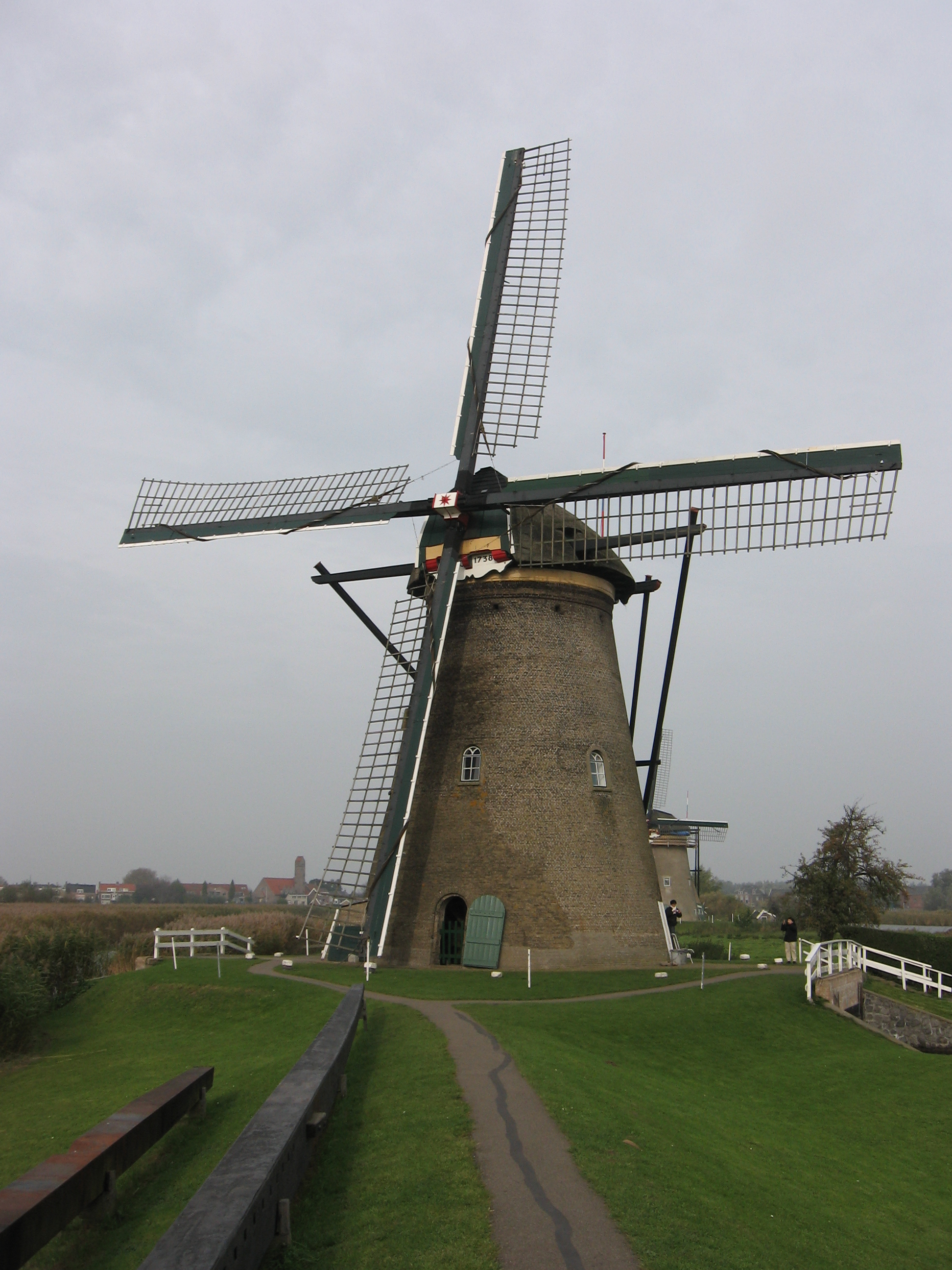

Nederwaard Molen No.2 is one of the Kinderdijk windmills, in the Dutch municipality of Molenlanden.

== Description ==
The mill, which dates from 1738, serves as a visitor mill. There is a museum house in the mill. The owner is the Kinderdijk World Heritage Foundation. The mill has an iron paddle wheel with a diameter of 6.30 meters with which the low basin of the Nederwaard is drained.
