= Cedar Avenue of Nikkō =

Noteworthy Japanese roads

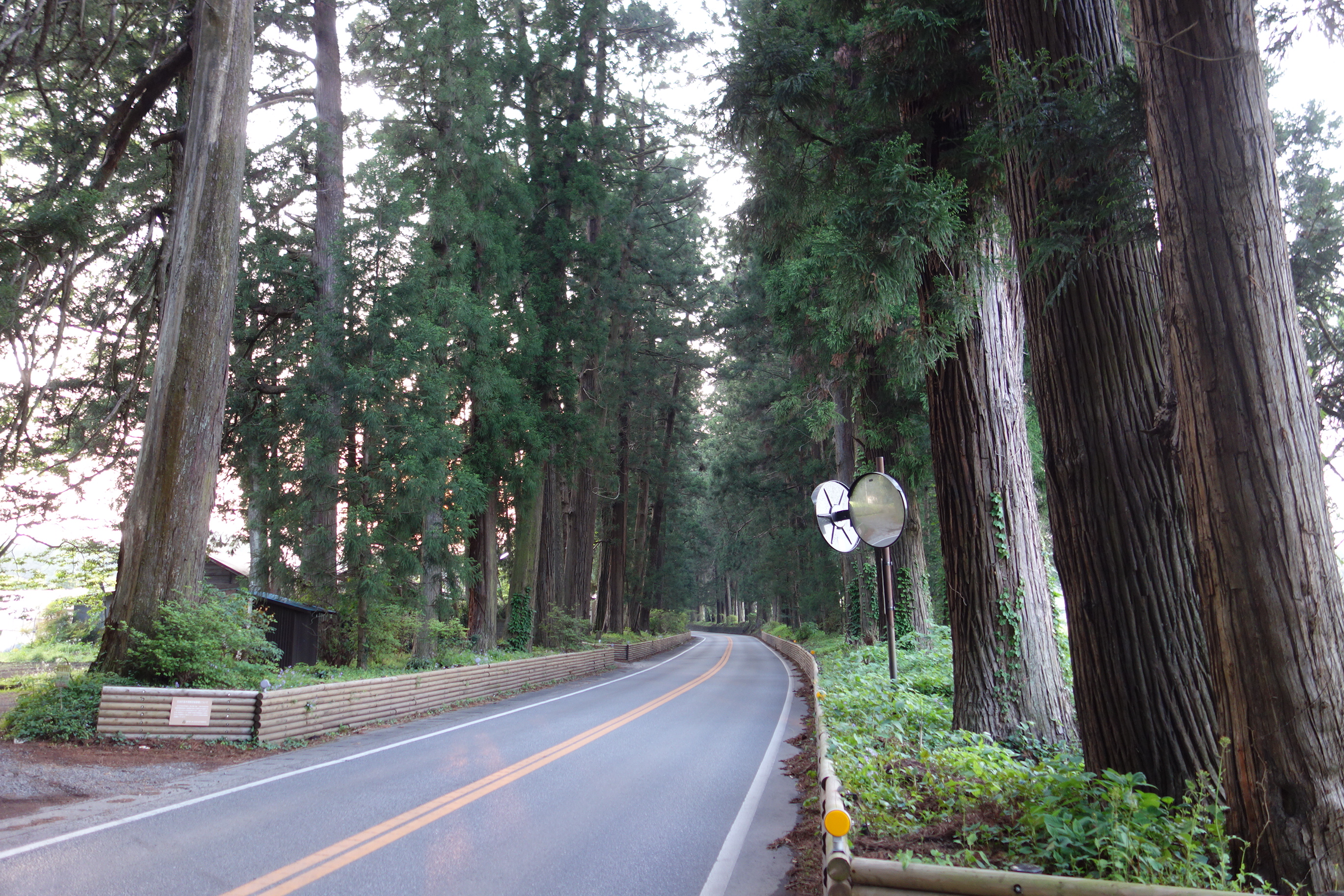
- A portion of the cedar avenue

- Location within Tochigi Prefecture Location within Japan
- Location: Nikkō, Tochigi, Japan
- Coordinates: 36.722913°N 139.69081735°E
- Length: 35.41 km (22.00 mi)
- Established: 1922
- Special Palace of Scenic Beauty Special Natural Monument

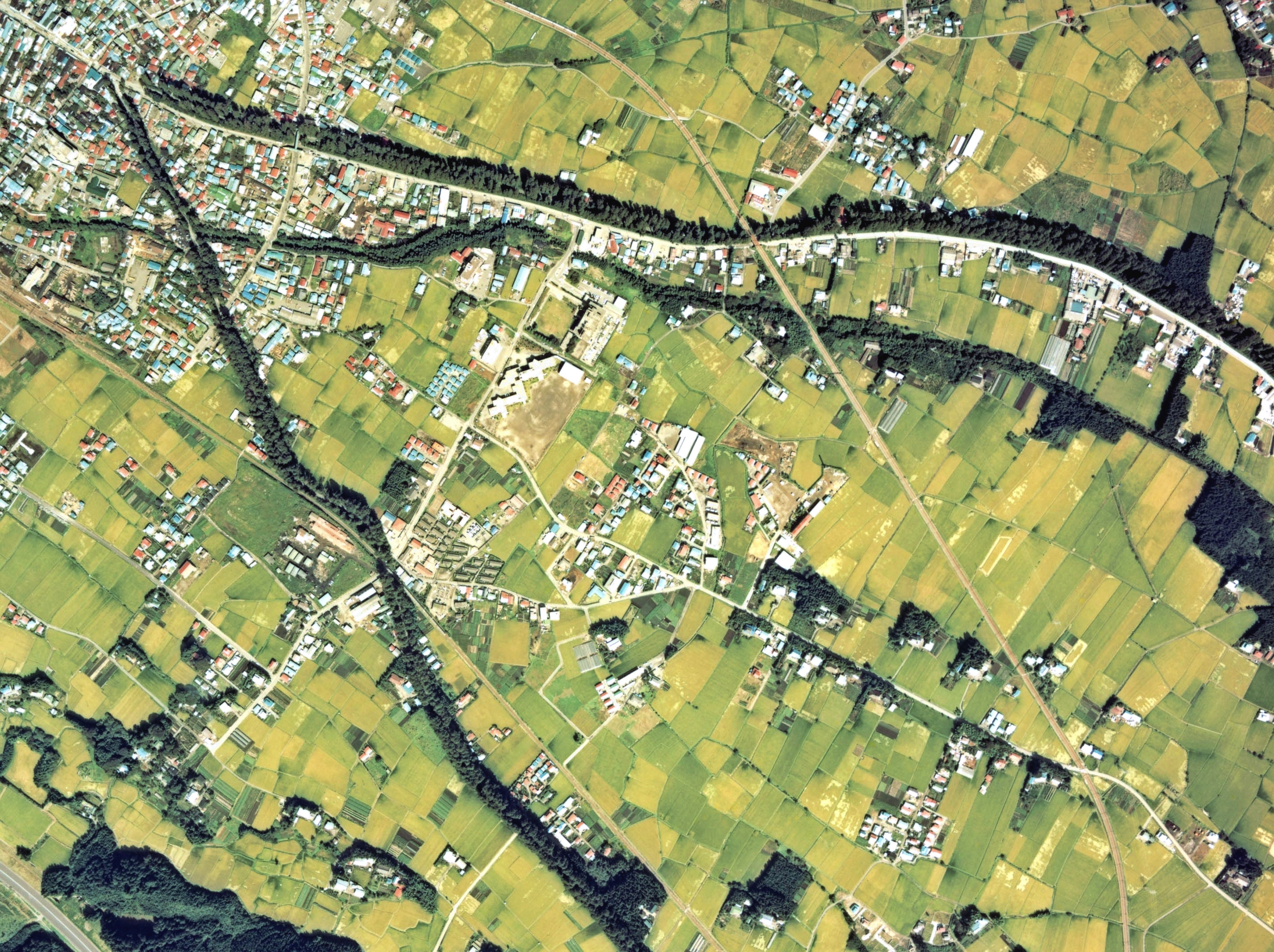
Aerial photograph showing the 3 avenues

The Cedar Avenue of Nikkō (日光杉並木, Nikkō suginami-ki) is the popular name for three separate tree-lined sections of roads in the city of Nikkō, Tochigi in the northern Kantō region of Japan. These roads are the Nikkō Kaidō, Nikkō Reiheishi Kaidō and Aizu Nishi Kaidō and the 13,000 cryptomeria trees lining a total of 35.41 kilometers (22.00 mi) of these roads form a monumental approach to the Shrines and Temples of Nikkō. Although it is not a single continuous road, the "Cedar Avenue of Nikkō" was listed in the 1996 Guinness Book of World Records as the longest tree-lined avenue in the world. It is the only cultural property designated by the Japanese Government as both a Special Historic Site and a Special Natural Monument.

== Overview ==
During the Edo period, the Tokugawa shogunate maintained a system of highways across Japan, including the Edo Five Routes, which connected the Shōgun's capital of Edo with the provinces. These routes were marked with ichirizuka to indicate distance, and were planted with trees on either side (typically Japanese red pine or cryptomeria) to provide shade for travelers. The routes to Nikkō were of especial importance to the Shogunate, as it held the mausoleum and memorial shrines and temples to its founder, Tokugawa Ieyasu, and his grandson Tokugawa Iemitsu, and was thus a pilgrimage destination for generations of Shōgun and important daimyō.

The project to plant the approaches to Nikkō with cryptomeria was begun by Matsudaira Masatsuna, daimyō of Tamanawa Domain in Sagami Province, and a descendant of a cadet branch of the Matsudaira clan. He began donating and planting seedlings brought from Kii Province around the year 1625. The cedar-lined approaches were officially dedicated to Tokugawa Ieyasu in 1648, on his 33rd memorial anniversary, and Matsudaira Masatsuna died later the same year. Memorial stone markers were erected in four locations by his son, who continued the project and, together with later donations, it is estimated that some 200,000 trees were planted. During the Edo period, the trees were managed by the Nikkō bugyō, the magistrate in charge of the Nikkō shrines and temples. After the Meiji Restoration, the trees were endangered by neglect and logging, but an estimated 12,500 trees survive to this day.

These 400-year-old trees remained endangered due to continued urban encroachment and due to the exhaust from automobiles, as the former footpaths they line have become modern highways (Japan National Route 119 and Japan National Route 121).

== See also ==
- List of Special Places of Scenic Beauty, Special Historic Sites and Special Natural Monuments
