= Japan Romantic Road =

Scenic route in Japan

- 日本ロマンチック街道

Route information
- Length: 320 km (200 mi)
- Existed: 1982–present
- Component highways: National Route 18; National Route 119; National Route 120; National Route 145; National Route 146

Major junctions
- East end: Utsunomiya
- West end: Ueda

Location
- Country: Japan

Highway system
- National highways of Japan; Expressways of Japan

The Japan Romantic Road (日本ロマンチック街道, Nihon Romanchikku kaidō) is a series of theme routes devised by local mayors along the route between Utsunomiya and Ueda in 1982. It describes 320 kilometers (200 mi) of several surface roads between Tochigi Prefecture and Nagano Prefecture in central Japan linking a number of scenic landscapes, onsen, and towns that parallel the scenery along the original Romantic Road in Southern Germany.

== Route description ==
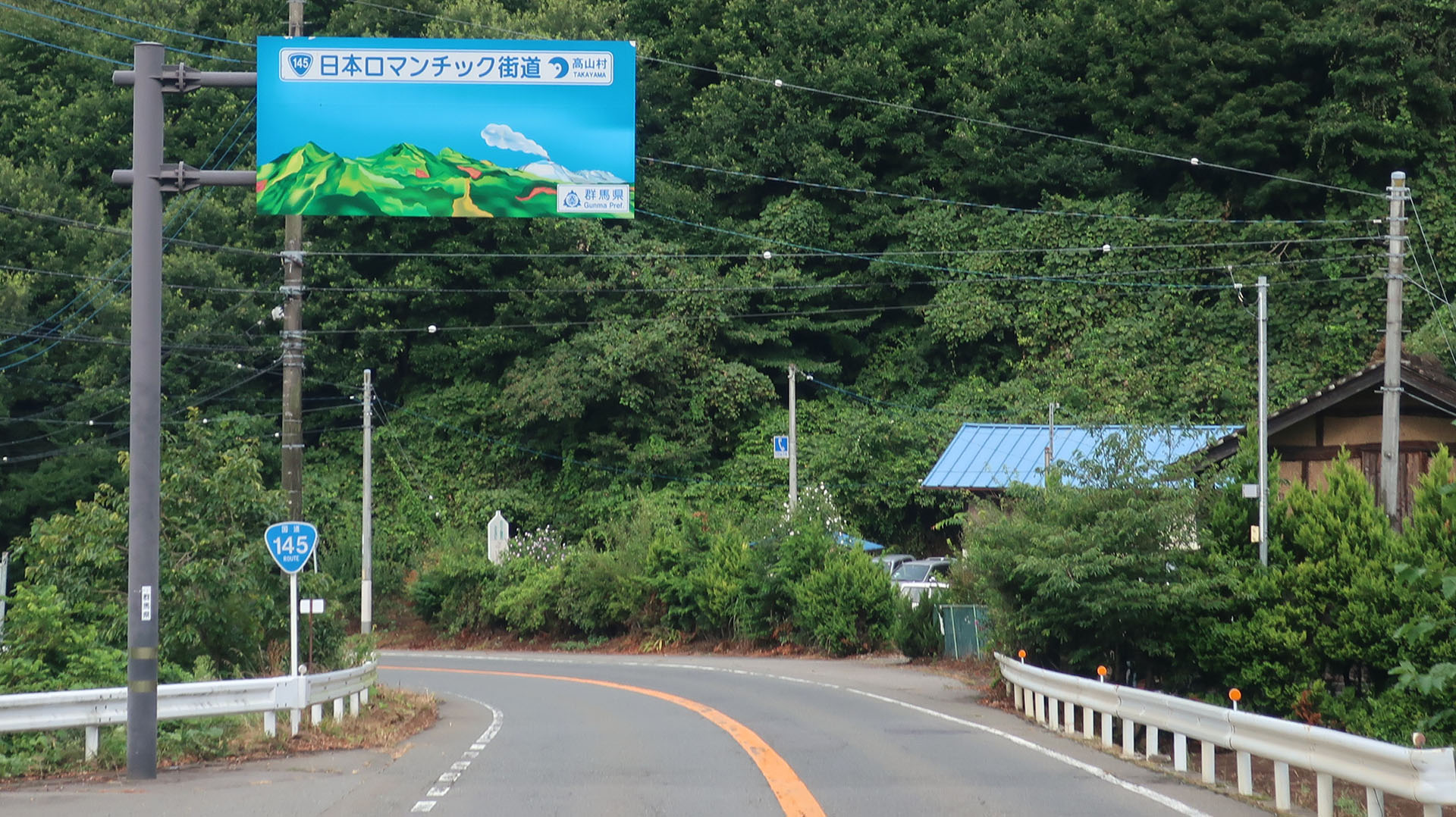
The Japan Romantic Road along National Route 145 in the village of Takayama

The Japan Romantic Road encompasses 320 kilometers (200 mi) of surface roads across Tochigi, Gunma, and Nagano prefectures in central Japan. It links a number of scenic landscapes, onsen, and towns that parallel the scenery along the original Romantic Road in Southern Germany.

From Utsunomiya, the road travels northwest along National Route 119 to Nikkō and the shrine to Tokugawa Ieyasu, Nikkō Tōshō-gū. It then follows National Route 120 to several scenic spots, including Lake Chūzenji, Fukiware Falls, and Oigami Onsen. The route leaves National Route 120 in Numata, continuing west on National Route 145 to National Route 353 where it heads north towards Shima Onsen. A spur of the route continues along National Route 353 to Shima Onsen; however, the main route curves back to the west along Gunma Prefecture Route 55. Prefecture Route 55 ends at a junction with National Route 292, which carries the Romantic Road through the resort town, Kusatsu. On the southern periphery of the town, the Romantic Road leaves National Route 292, continuing west on Gunma Prefecture Route 59 to toll roads that travel around the base of Mount Asama to Karuizawa, Nagano in Nagano Prefecture.

The Romantic Road joins National Route 18 in Kusatsu, then briefly leaves it in Miyota to divert drivers to Shinraku Temple along Nagano Prefecture Route 80. Prefecture Route 80 ends at a junction with National Route 18 w, which resumes carrying the Romantic Road. It passes through the Edo period castle town of Komoro before terminating in the city of Ueda. Through drivers should be aware that there are tolls along the route near Mount Asama and that the road is closed between Lake Chūzenji and Fukiware Falls during the winter.

== History ==
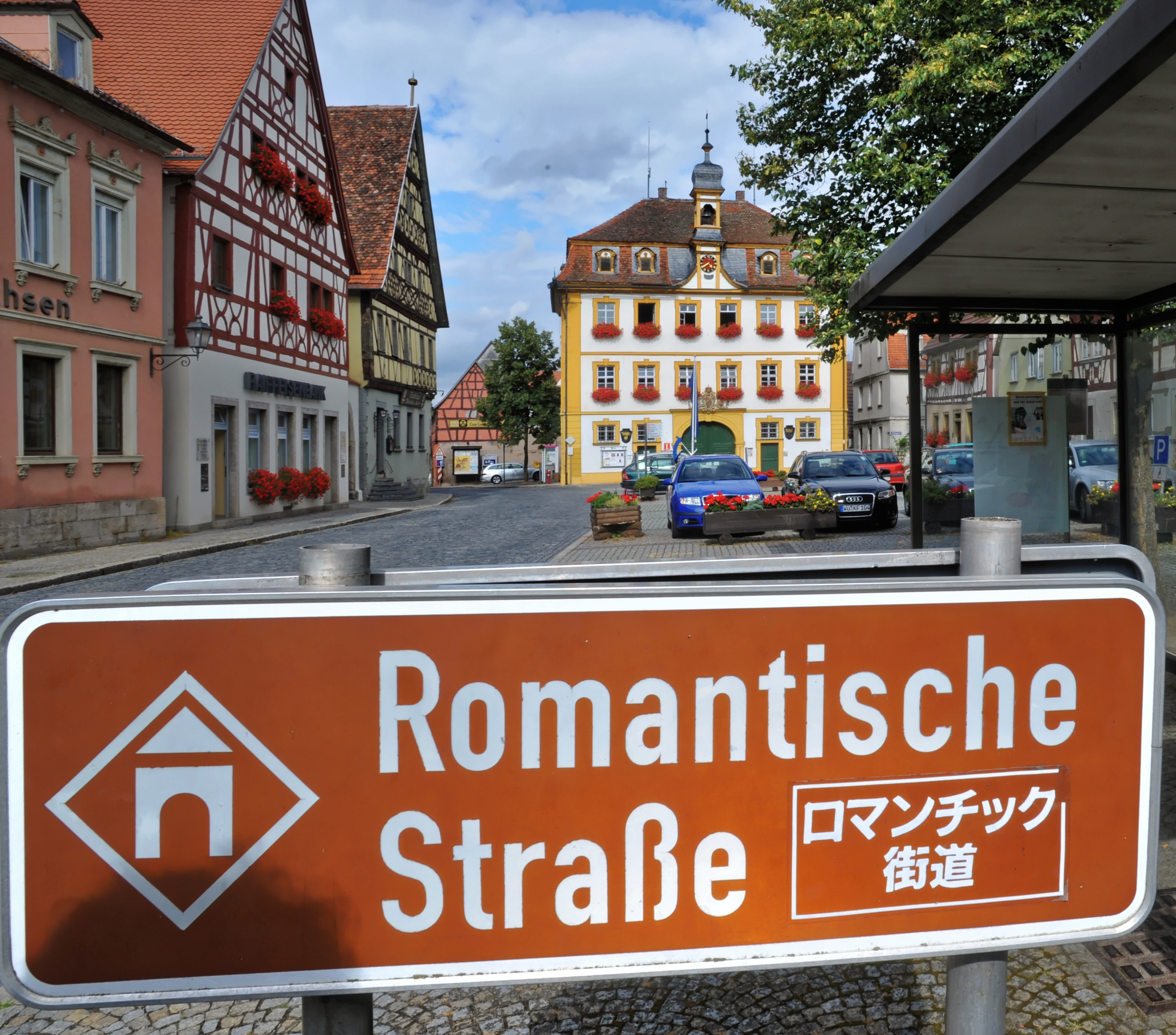
Bilingual sign on the Romantic Road in Röttingen, Germany

The Japan Romantic Road was established along existing roads and highways in 1982 by a coalition of mayors along the route. On 25 November 1988 the associations managing the Japan Romantic Road and the original Romantic Road in Germany signed a 100-year "sister road" agreement, to promote exchange between the two groups and their respective countries. The creation of the Japan Romantic Road had increased awareness by the 1990s among the Japanese to the point where 93 percent of their traveling public had heard about the original Romantic Road; this popularity led to the installation of bilingual signs along the Romantic Road in Germany including both German and Japanese text.
