= Jōshin'etsu region =

Region of Honshu, Japan

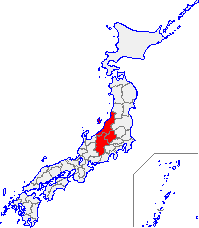
Jōshin'etsu region

The Jōshin'etsu region (上信越地方, Jōshin'etsu chihō) is a region on the main Japanese island of Honshu, comprising parts of Gunma, Nagano, and Niigata Prefectures. It is a mountainous area with a large national park and numerous hot springs and ski resorts. It has long been a transportation corridor between the Kantō plain and coastal areas on the Japan Sea side of the island.

== Overview ==
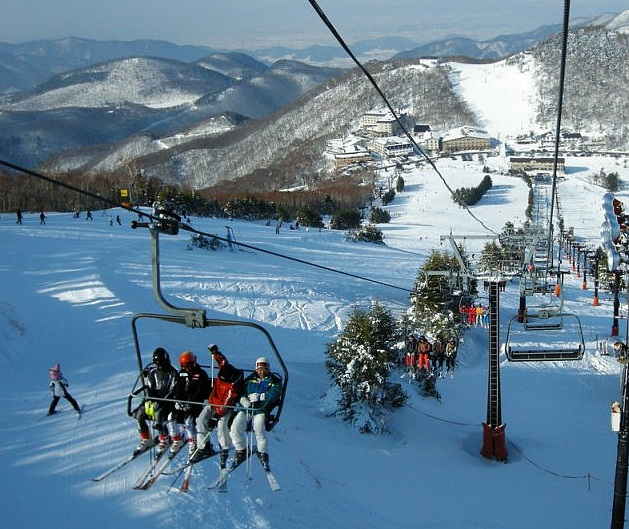
Takamagahara ski lift

The Jōshin'etsu region includes northern and western Gunma Prefecture, northern and eastern Nagano Prefecture, and central and southern Niigata Prefecture. The name is derived by combining characters from the corresponding historical provinces: Kōzuke, Shinano, and Echigo.

The region is in Japan's snow country and is home to many ski and snowboard resorts.

== National park ==
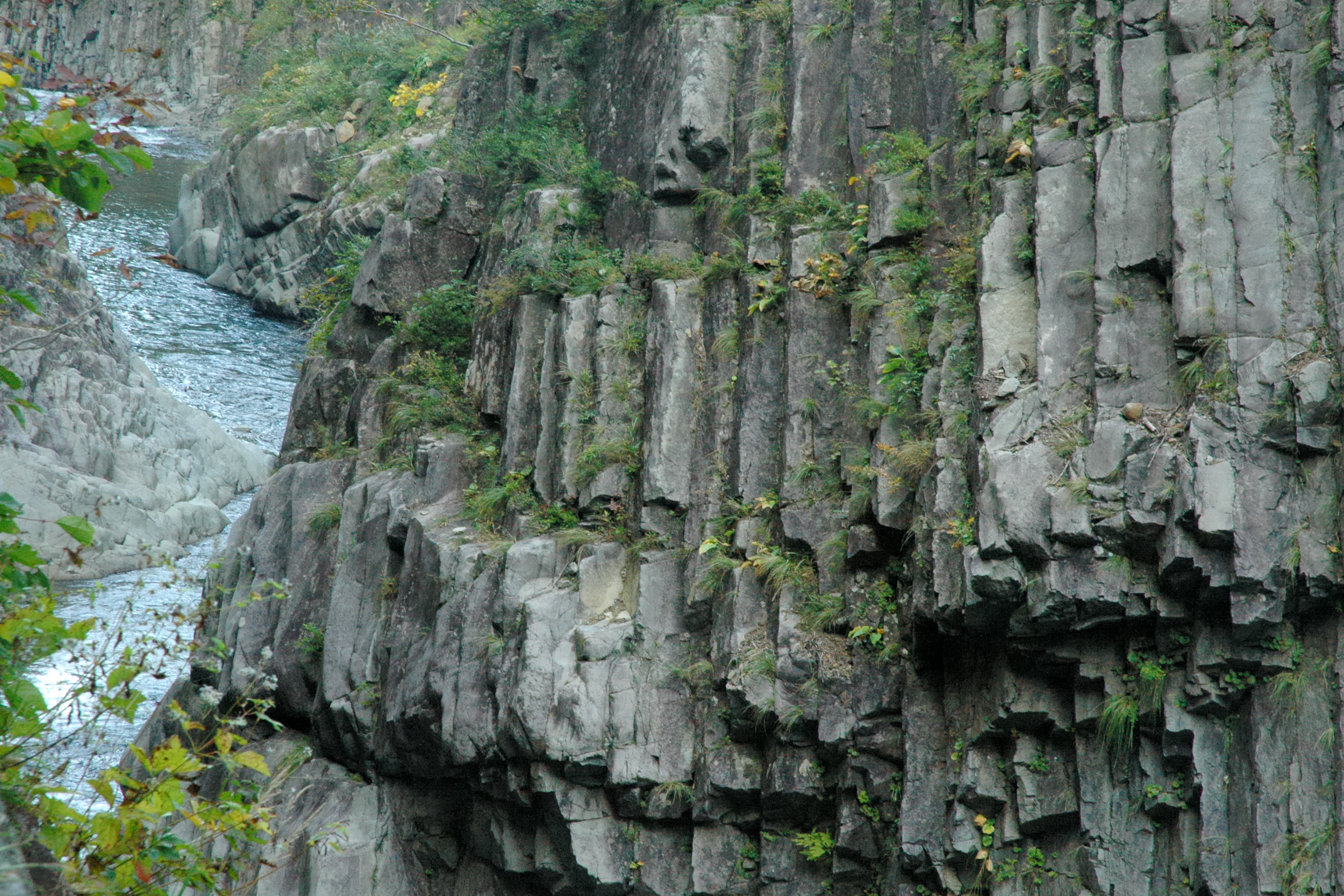
Kiyotsu Gorge

The Jōshin'etsu-kōgen National Park is one of five national parks in the mountainous regions that ring the northern and western sides of the Kantō Plain. The second largest national park in Japan, it is located at almost the center of the main island. It extends over multiple high plateaus and mountain ranges with steep rock faces. In particular, the sheer eastern face of Mount Tanigawa is noted as an excellent spot for rock climbing. To the west of the Tanigawa Chain is the Kiyotsu Gorge, considered one of the three great scenic valleys of Japan.

== Geography ==
Geologically this region is in the Fossa Magna, a large depressed zone that divides northeastern from southwestern Japan. It consists of sedimentary, volcanic, and pyroclastic rocks, and has numerous volcanos and hot springs. Mount Asama, at the south end of a chain of volcanos, is an active volcano that has erupted repeatedly in modern times. A large lava field on its north side dates from an eruption in 1783.

- Hot springs: Kusatsu Onsen, Minakami Onsen, Nozawa Onsen, Bessho Onsen, Senami Onsen
- Mountains: Mount Asama, Mount Shirouma, Mount Myōkō, Mount Togakushi
- Rivers: Chikuma River, Shinano River, Hime River, Tone River, Agano River
- Lakes: Lake Nojiri, Lake Nozori

== Transportation ==
In the Edo period, the Jōshin'etsu region was traversed by the Hokkoku Kaidō and was an important corridor connecting the capital city Edo to provincial regions on the Japan Sea coast. Pilgrims from Edo travelled over this road to Zenkō-ji, and daimyō used it for their periodic sankin kōtai journeys between Edo and their fiefs.

Today the Jōshin'etsu region is connected to the Kantō and Hokuriku regions by expressway and high-speed rail.

=== Rail ===
- Jōetsu Shinkansen
- Hokuriku Shinkansen
- Jōetsu Line
- Shin'etsu Main Line
- Shinano Railway Line
- Kita-Shinano Line
- Myōkō_Haneuma_Line
- Nihonkai_Hisui_Line
- Hokuhoku Line
- Agatsuma Line
- Koumi Line
- Iiyama Line
- Ōito Line

=== Roads ===
- Kan-Etsu Expressway
- Jōshin-etsu Expressway
- Hokuriku Expressway
- Japan National Route 8
- Japan National Route 17
- Japan National Route 18
- Japan National Route 117
- Japan National Route 141
- Japan National Route 144
- Japan National Route 145
- Japan National Route 147
- Japan National Route 148
- Japan National Route 292
- Japan National Route 406

== See also ==
- Shiga Highlands
- Togakushi Shrine
- Kōshin'etsu region
