= Nikkō Utsunomiya Road =

Toll road in Tochigi Prefecture, Japan

Nikkō Utsunomiya Road
- 日光宇都宮道路

Route information
- Maintained by Tochigi Prefecture Road Public Corporation
- Length: 30.7 km (19.1 mi)
- Existed: 1976–present
- Component highways: National Route 119; National Route 120

Major junctions
- From: Utsunomiya Interchange; National Route 119 / Tōhoku Expressway in Utsunomiya
- To: Kiyotaki Interchange; National Route 120 in Nikkō

Location
- Country: Japan

Highway system
- National highways of Japan; Expressways of Japan

The Nikkō Utsunomiya Road (日光宇都宮道路, Nikkō Utsunomiya Dōro) is a toll road in Tochigi Prefecture, Japan. It is signed E81 under the "2016 Proposal for Realization of Expressway Numbering."

== Route description ==
The road is the main access route for the city of Nikkō, a popular getaway for tourists in the northern part of Tochigi Prefecture. It connects directly to the Tōhoku Expressway, which leads to the greater Tokyo area and points to the north in the Tōhoku region. The road is officially designated as a bypass for National Route 119 (Utsunomiya Interchange to Nikkō Interchange) and National Route 120 (Nikkō Interchange to Kiyotaki Interchange). The road is designated for motor vehicles only (自動車専用道路, Jidōsha Senyō Dōro) (motor vehicles must have a displacement of at least 125 cc). The design standard of the road is similar to most national expressways in Japan. The road has four lanes on the section designated as National Route 119 with a speed limit of 80 km/h, and two lanes on the section designated as National Route 120 with a speed limit of 60 km/h.

== History ==
The first section of the road was opened to traffic in 1976 and the entire route was completed in 1981. It was originally built and managed by Japan Highway Public Corporation, however ownership was transferred to Tochigi Prefecture Road Public Corporation in 2005. Electronic Toll Collection (ETC) was implemented at toll stations following the transfer, and discounted fares were introduced for off-season (December to April) and off-peak (17:00-09:00) travel.

== List of interchanges and features ==
The route lies entirely within Tochigi Prefecture.

Location	km	mi	Exit	Name	Destinations	Notes
Utsunomiya	0.0	0.0	–	Utsunomiya	Tōhoku Expressway – to Kita-Kantō Expressway, Fukushima, Tokyo; National Route 119 east (Utsunomiya-kita Road) – to National Route 4, Oyama, Tochigi	Eastern terminus of E81; highway continues east as the Utsunomiya-kita Road; E4 exit 10
Utsunomiya	1.6	0.99	1	Tokujira	National Route 293 – Kanuma, Ōya, Nikkō, Sakura	
Utsunomiya	5.1	3.2	1-1	Shinoi	Tochigi Prefecture Route 149 (Okorogawa Fubasami Ishinada Route) – to National Route 119, Fubasami	Westbound exit, eastbound entrance only
Nikkō	11.2	7.0	2 / TB	Ōsawa	Tochigi Prefecture Route 110 (Shimotsuke Ōsawa Teishajō Route) – Nikkō, Utsunomiya, Shimotsuke-Ōsawa Station	
Nikkō	15.4	9.6	2-1	Dosawa	National Route 121 / National Route 352 (Itabashi Bypass) – to National Route 119, Nikkō Industrial Park, Nikkō, Kinugawa, Kanuma, Ōsawa	
Nikkō	19.8	12.3	3	Imaichi	National Route 121 / Tochigi Prefecture Route 70 (Utsunomiya Imaichi Route) – Okoregawa, Central Nikkō	
Nikkō	22.2	13.8	PA	Nikkōguchi		
Nikkō	24.7	15.3	4 / TB	Nikkō	Unnamed city street – to National Route 119 (Nikkō Kaidō); National Route 119 east National Route 120 west	Western terminus of National Route 119, eastern terminus of National Route 120
Nikkō	30.7	19.1	5	Kiyotaki	National Route 120 / National Route 122 – Lake Chūzenji, Ashio, Central Nikkō	Western terminus of E81
1.000 mi = 1.609 km; 1.000 km = 0.621 mi: Incomplete access; Route transition
