= E81 =

E81 may refer to:

- European route E81
- King's Indian Defence, Encyclopaedia of Chess Openings code
- Nikkō Utsunomiya Road, route E81 in Japan
