= Japan National Route 119 =

National highway in Tochigi Prefecture, Japan

National Route 119
- 国道119号
- National Route 119 highlighted in red

Route information
- Length: 39.4 km (24.5 mi)
- Existed: 1953–present

Major junctions
- West end: National Route 120 / National Route 122 / Tochigi Prefecture Route 247 in Nikkō
- East end: National Route 4 in Utsunomiya

Nikkō Utsunomiya Road section
- Length: 24.5 km (15.2 mi)
- West end: Nikkō Interchange; Nikkō Utsunomiya Road in Nikkō
- East end: Utsunomiya Interchange; Tōhoku Expressway in Utsunomiya

Location
- Country: Japan

Highway system
- National highways of Japan; Expressways of Japan
← National Route 118	→ National Route 120

National Route 119 (国道119号, Kokudō Hyakujūkyū-gō) is a national highway located entirely within Tochigi Prefecture, Japan. It connects the city of Nikkō to Utsunomiya, the prefecture's capital, and has a total length of 63.9 kilometers (39.7 mi). The present-day highway largely follows the path of the Nikkō Kaidō, an Edo period road that linked Edo and the Shrines and Temples of Nikkō.

== Route description ==
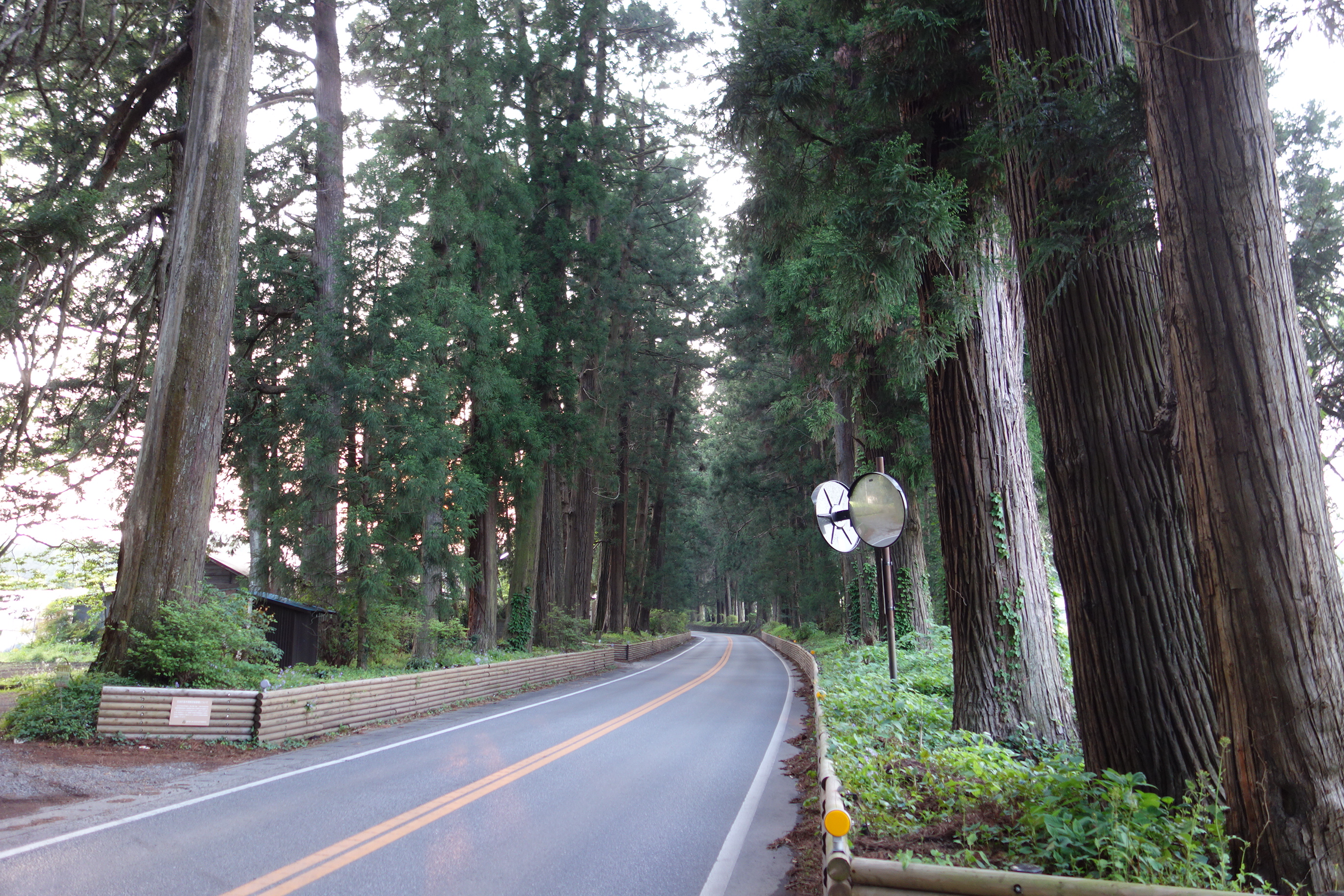
A stretch of National Route 119 along the Cedar Avenue of Nikkō.

The designation of National Route 119 applies to two highways. The first highway to carry the designation almost entirely follows the original Nikkō Kaidō from National Route 120 and National Route 122 at Rinnō-ji in Nikkō to a junction with National Route 4 to the south of central Utsunomiya. The second highway follows the Nikkō Utsunomiya Road from Nikko Interchange to its eastern terminus at the Tōhoku Expressway. The two highways have a total length of 63.9 kilometers (39.7 mi).

=== Nikkō Kaidō route ===
The highway that follows the original routing of the Nikkō Kaidō has a total length of 39.4 kilometers (24.5 mi). This routing of National Route 119 makes up the Nikkō–Utsunomiya leg of the scenic Japan Romantic Road that stretches across Tochigi and Nagano prefectures. The highway was deemed by Guinness World Records to be a part of what the organization called the world's longest tree-lined avenue, the Cedar Avenue of Nikkō.

The highway begins at a junction near Rinnō-ji with National Routes 120 and 122 and Tochigi Prefecture Route 247 in Nikkō. From there it travels southwest through the central district of the city, where it begins running parallel with the Tōbu Nikkō Line and the Nikkō Utsunomiya Road. Within the former city of Imaichi, the highway has junctions with National Routes 121, 352, and 461—sharing a brief concurrency with the former two of the three routes. Crossing into Utsunomiya, the highway begins gradually curving to the south still paralleling the Nikkō Utsunomiya Road, but moving away from the Tōbu Nikkō Line.

In northwestern Utsunomiya, the highway has a junction with National Route 293. Further south, the highway passes beneath, but does not connect directly to, the Tōhoku Expressway. It instead intersects with the Utsunomiya-kita Road, and auxiliary route of National Route 119 that has a junction with the expressway, just to the south of that underpass. The Utsunomiya-kita Road and National Route 119 run parallel to one another for a short distance before they intersect with the Utsunomiya Ring Road, there the auxiliary route curves to the east towards its end while the main route continues south towards central Utsunomiya. In central Utsunomiya the highway zigzags its way south past several key locations, such as the city hall, the Tochigi Prefecture Office, and Tōbu-Utsunomiya Station before coming to an end just under two kilometers south at a junction with National Route 4.

=== Nikkō Utsunomiya Road ===
The part of the Nikkō Utsunomiya Road designated as National Route 119 has a total length of 24.5 kilometers (15.2 mi). The highway is designated for motor vehicles with a displacement of at least 125 cc. The design standard of the road is similar to most national expressways in Japan. The road has four lanes on the section designated as a part of National Route 119 and a speed limit of 80 km/h.

== History ==
Much of what is presently National Route 119 was preceded by the northernmost section of the Nikkō Kaidō, a road established by the Tokugawa shogunate during the Edo period. It connected Edo and the Shrines and Temples of Nikkō. Secondary National Route 119 was established by the Cabinet of Japan between of Nikkō and Utsunomiya in 1953 along pre-existing roads, mostly made up of the section of the Nikkō Kaidō between the two municipalities. In 1965, the Cabinet of Japan amended the highway's designation, upgrading it from its secondary status to a full national highway.

In 1988, an ordinance was put in place along the Nikkō Kaidō that forbade any new installation of large advertisements along tree-lined sections of the road. On 16 May 2018, a section of the highway was rerouted to protect the Cedar Avenue of Nikkō, a protected tree-lined section of the original Nikkō Kaidō that was being degraded by the heavy automobile traffic of the national highway.

== Major intersections ==
The route lies entirely within Tochigi Prefecture. For the Nikkō Utsunomiya Road section of National Route 119, see the junction list of that article.

Location	km	mi	Destinations	Notes
Nikkō	0.0	0.0	National Route 120 west / National Route 122 south – Lake Chūzenji, Numata; Tochigi Prefecture Route 247 east	Western terminus
Nikkō	1.4	0.87	Tochigi Prefecture Route 169 north – Kuriyama, Kirifugi Highland	
Nikkō	1.5	0.93	Tochigi Prefecture Route 14 south	
Nikkō	1.7	1.1	Tochigi Prefecture Route 203 north – Nikkō Station	
Nikkō	8.0	5.0	National Route 121 north / National Route 352 west – Kawaji, Kinugawa	Western end of concurrency with National Routes 121 and 352
Nikkō	8.4	5.2	Tochigi Prefecture Route 62 east – Shimo-Imaichi Station; Tochigi Prefecture Route 229 south – Imaichi Station	
Nikkō	8.5	5.3	National Route 121 south / National Route 352 east – Kanuma	Eastern end of concurrency with National Routes 121 and 352
Nikkō	9.8	6.1	National Route 461 east – Kinugawa, Yaita	
Nikkō	11.3	7.0	National Route 121 south (Itabashi Bypass) – to Nikkō Utsunomiya Road, Kanuma	
Nikkō	14.0	8.7	Tochigi Prefecture Route 279 north – Kinugawa, Ōkuwa	
Nikkō	15.8	9.8	Tochigi Prefecture Route 110 west – to Nikkō Utsunomiya Road, Shimotsuke-Ōsawa Station	
Nikkō	16.3	10.1	Tochigi Prefecture Route 22 south – Inokura	
Nikkō	16.9	10.5	Tochigi Prefecture Route 295 north – Imaichi Youth Sports Center	
Utsunomiya	21.9	13.6	Tochigi Prefecture Route 149 west – Fubasami	
Utsunomiya	22.9	14.2	Tochigi Prefecture Route 77 north – Funyu	
Utsunomiya	25.4	15.8	National Route 293 – Kanuma, Sakura	
Utsunomiya	28.3	17.6	National Route 119 (Utsunomiya-kita Road) – to Tōhoku Expressway, Nikkō Utsunomiya Road, National Route 4, Oyama, Tochigi	Interchange
Utsunomiya	32.3	20.1	Tochigi Prefecture Route 3 / Tochigi Prefecture Route 157 east (Utsunomiya Ring Road) – to National Route 4, Utsunomiya-kita Road, Sakura, Tochigi, Kanuma	
Utsunomiya	35.4	22.0	Kiyosumichichō-dōri – to National Route 4	
Utsunomiya	35.6	22.1	Tochigi Prefecture Route 22 north	
Utsunomiya	36.6	22.7	Tochigi Prefecture Route 2 south – to Tōhoku Expressway, Tochigi; Tochigi Prefecture Route 70 west – to National Route 293, Ōya	
Utsunomiya	36.8	22.9	Tochigi Prefecture Route 10 east – Utsunomiya Station, Tochigi Prefecture Office	
Utsunomiya	39.4	24.5	National Route 4 (Utsunomiya Bypass) – Koga, Oyama, Nasushiobara, Sakura	Eastern terminus
1.000 mi = 1.609 km; 1.000 km = 0.621 mi: Concurrency terminus

== Auxiliary routes ==
=== Utsunomiya-kita Road ===
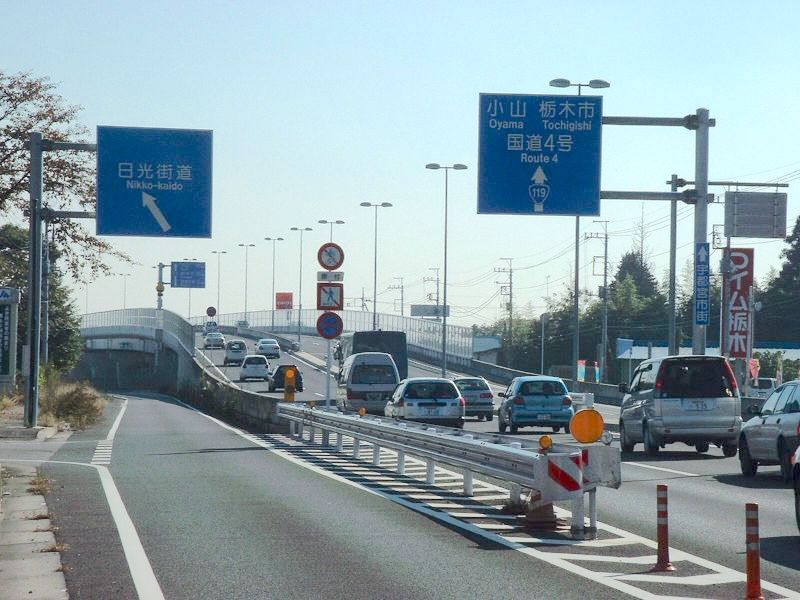
The Utsunomiya-kita Road near its western terminus.

The Utsunomiya-kita Road forms the northern section of the Utsunomiya Ring Road, and as an auxiliary route of National Route 119, it has the function of bypassing the narrow Nikkō Kaidō and connecting National Route 4 with the Nikkō Kaidō without passing through the central district of Utsunomiya. Its western terminus is Utsunomiya Interchange where it continues west towards Nikkō as the Nikkō Utsunomiya Road and its eastern terminus is at National Route 4 in the northeastern part of Utsunomiya. Before the opening of the Utsunomiya-kita Road in 1972, vehicles passing from National Route 119 to the southeastern part of the prefecture and Ibaraki prefecture had to go through the center of Utsunomiya, which caused heavy traffic. The opening of the bypass reduced traffic in central Utsunomiya.
