= Aizu Nishi Kaidō =

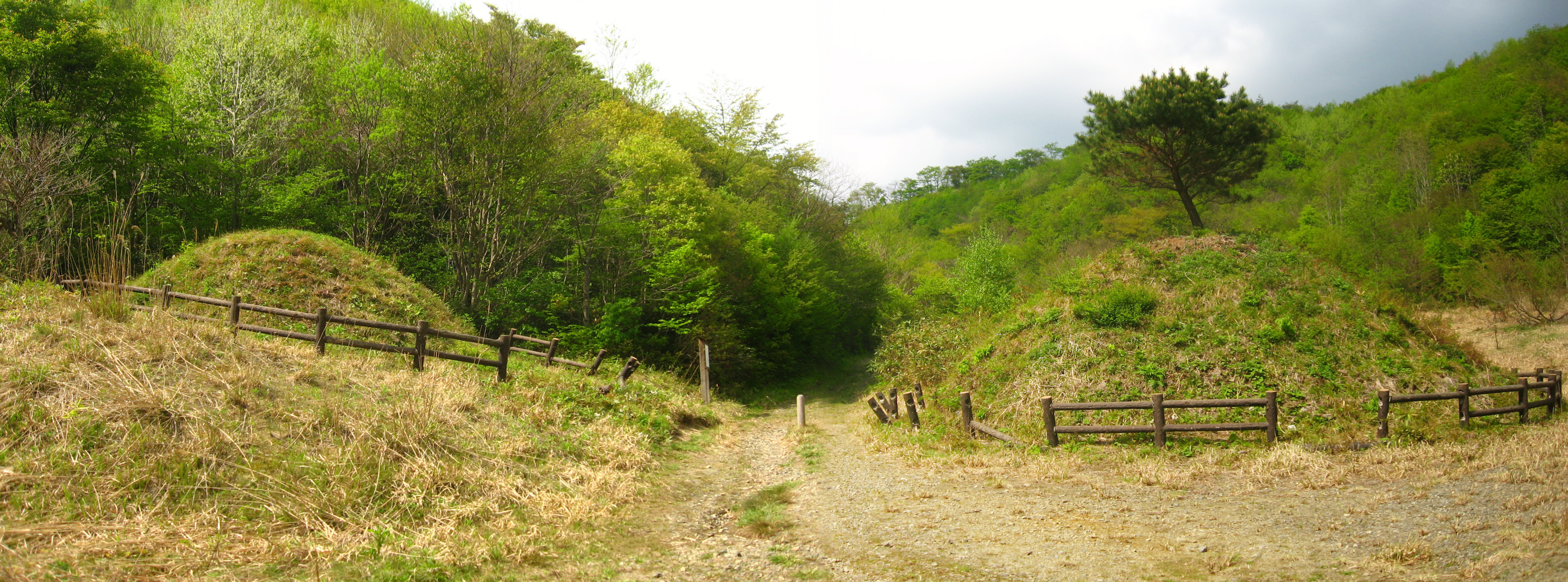
Ōuchi Pass ichirizuka

The Aizu Nishi Kaidō (会津西街道) was a 130 km (81 mi) pre-modern highway constructed in Edo period Japan. It was built to connect Imaichi, Shimotsuke Province (in modern-day Tochigi Prefecture) with Aizuwakamatsu Castle in modern-day Fukushima Prefecture. It is roughly traced by Japan National Route 121 and Fukushima Prefectural Route 131.

== History and background ==
With the establishment of Aizu Domain, the daimyō Hoshina Masayuki (1611-1673) called for the construction of a road to connect his castle with the Ōshū Kaidō, which was the main route north-south from the Tokugawa shogunate's capital of Edo (modern-day Tokyo). Part of the reason for this road was economic, as the Aizu area was geographically isolated by mountains. It was also political, as the daimyō (regional ruler) of Aizu were required to travel back-and-forth to Edo on alternative years with a large retinue under the sankin-kōtai system and needed a well-maintained road with suitable post stations for rest and resupply along the route. The road Hoshina Masayuki created was marked with ichirizuka distance markers to facilitate travel. The road was named the Shimotsuke Kaidō (下野街道) or sometimes the Minamiyama dōri (南山通り). In addition to Aizu Domain, the route also proved popular with the sankin-kōtai retinues of Shibata Domain, Murakami Domain, Shōnai Domain and Yonezawa Domain.

The route was closed from 1683 to 1723, when a landslide blocked the Kinugawa River creating a natural dam. When the dam burst in 1723 during torrential rains, 1200 people were killed by the flood in downstream of Utsunomiya. The road was used by the forces of the Satchō Alliance en route to destroy Aizu Domain during the Battle of Aizu in the Boshin War.

In 2002, a well-preserved ten kilometer section of the route centered on Ōuchi-juku between Aizumisato and Shimogō, including Hidama Pass and Ōuchi Pass was designated a National Historic Site of Japan.

== Stations of the Aizu Nishi Kaidō ==
The 16 post stations of the Aizu Nishi Kaidō, with their present-day municipalities listed beside them.

=== Tochigi Prefecture ===
Starting location: Imaichi-shuku (今市宿) (Nikkō) (also part of the Nikkō Kaidō)
1. Ōkuwa-shuku (大桑宿) (Nikkō)
2. Takatoku-shuku (高徳宿) (Nikkō)
3. Ōhara-shuku (大原宿) (Nikkō)
4. Fujihara-shuku (藤原宿) (Nikkō)
5. Takaharashinden-shuku (高原新田宿) (Nikkō)
6. Gōjūri-shuku (五十里宿) (Nikkō)
7. Miyori-shuku (三依宿) (Nikkō)
8. Yokokawa-shuku (横川宿) (Nikkō)

=== Fukushima Prefecture ===
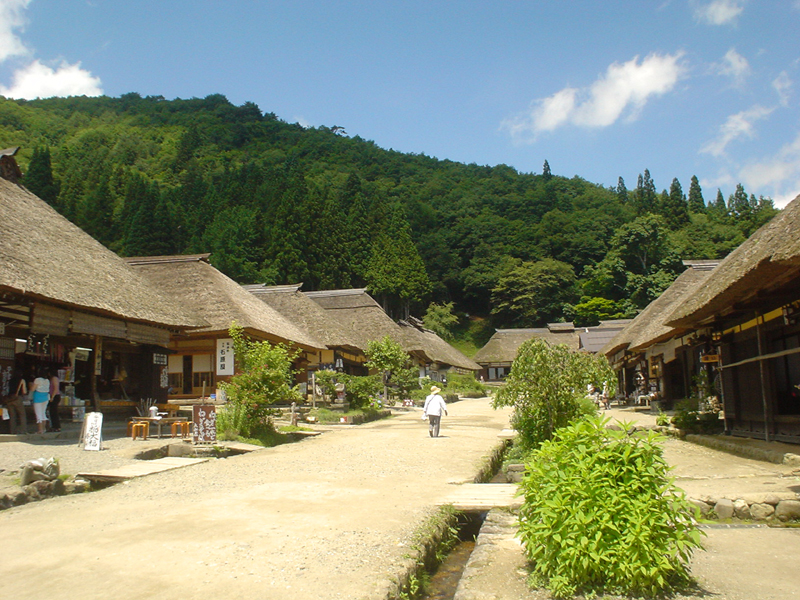
Ōuchi-juku

9. Itozawa-juku (糸沢宿) (Minamiaizu)
10. Kawashima-juku (川島宿) (Minamiaizu)
11. Tajima-juku (田島宿) (Minamiaizu)
12. Narahara-juku (楢原宿) (Shimogō)
13. Kuratani-juku (倉谷宿) (Shimogō)
14. Ōuchi-juku (大内宿) (Shimogō)
15. Sekiyama-juku (関山宿) (Aizumisato)
16. Fukunaga-juku (福永宿) (Aizumisato)
Ending Location: Aizuwakamatsu Castle (若松城) (Aizuwakamatsu)

== See also ==
- Ōuchi-juku
- List of Historic Sites of Japan (Fukushima)
- Edo Five Routes
