= Ōuchi-juku =

Post station in Fukushima, Japan

Ōuchi-juku 大内宿
- Town
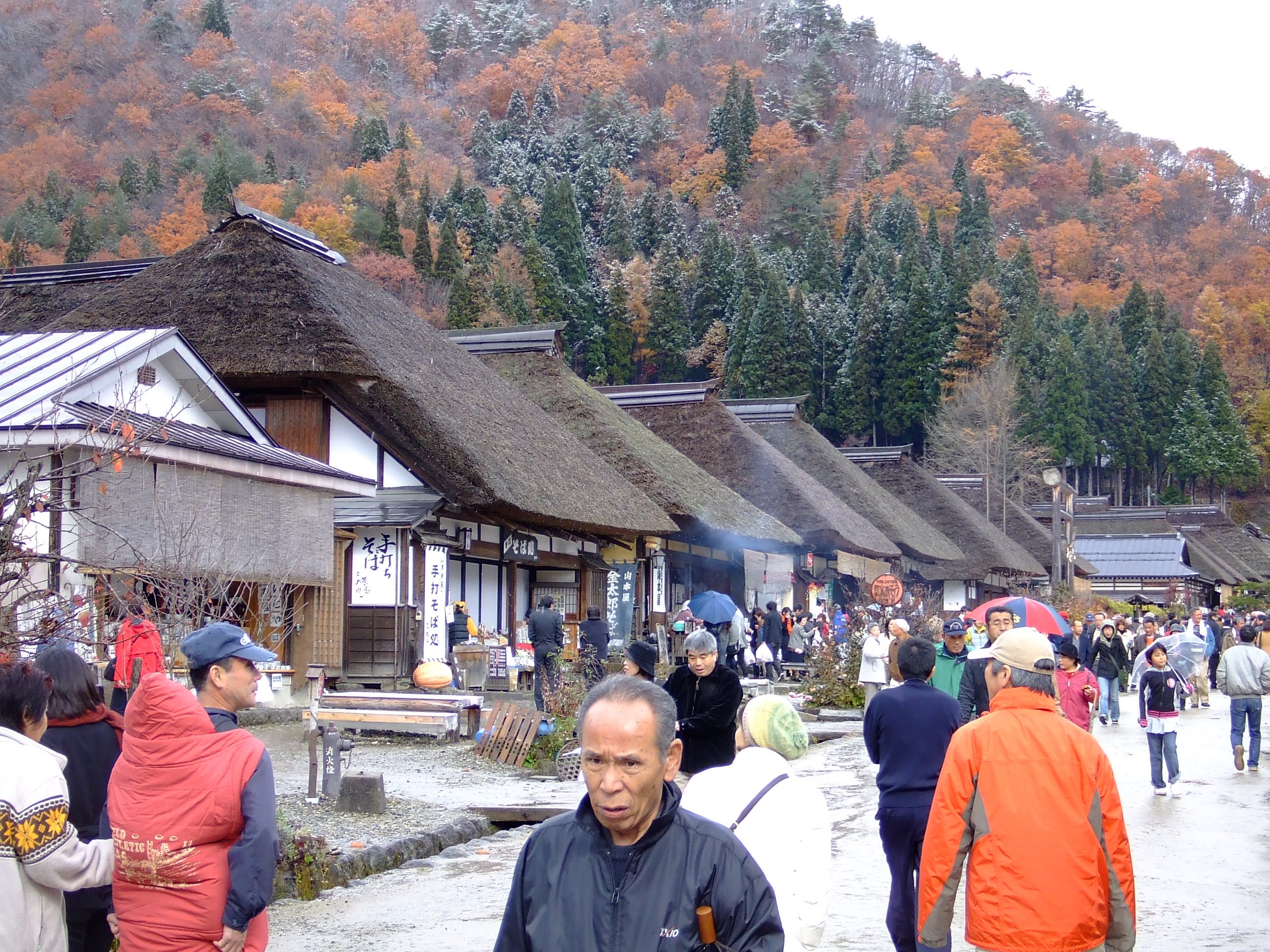
- Interactive map of Ōuchi-juku
- Coordinates: 37.33362°N 139.86082°E
- Country: Japan

Ōuchi-juku (大内宿, Ōuchi-juku) was a small post station in Japan's Edo period and part of the Aizu Nishi Kaidō. It is now located in the town of Shimogō in Minamiaizu District, Fukushima Prefecture, and is famous for the numerous traditional thatched buildings from the Edo Period that line its main street.

== History ==
Ōuchi-juku was an important post town whose buildings served as shops, inns and restaurants for travellers. Many buildings have been preserved as they were before the Meiji Restoration, and the area has been designated as an Important Preservation District for Groups of Traditional Buildings. The village is now a popular tourist attraction.

== Gallery ==
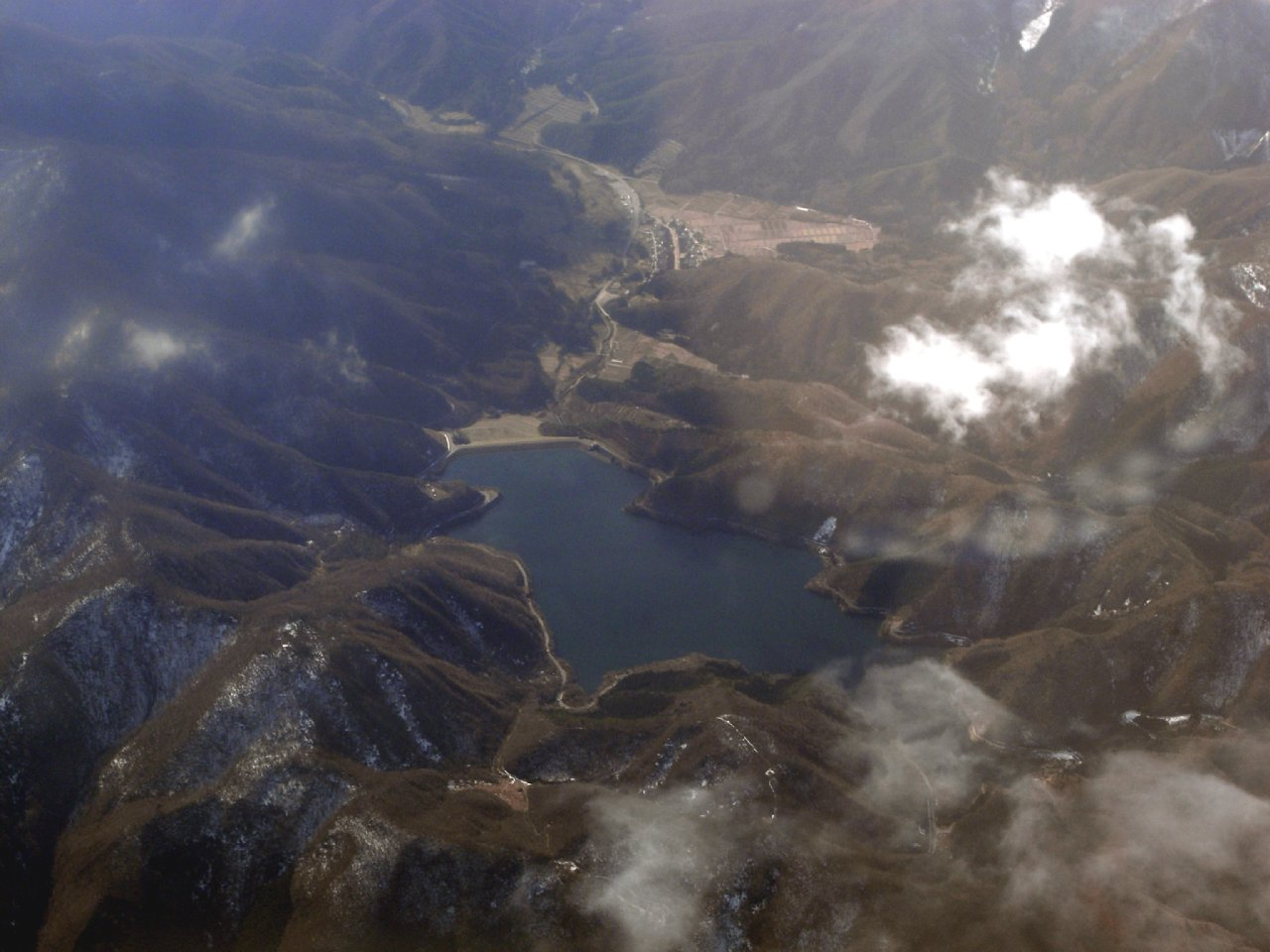
An aerial view of Ouchi-juku

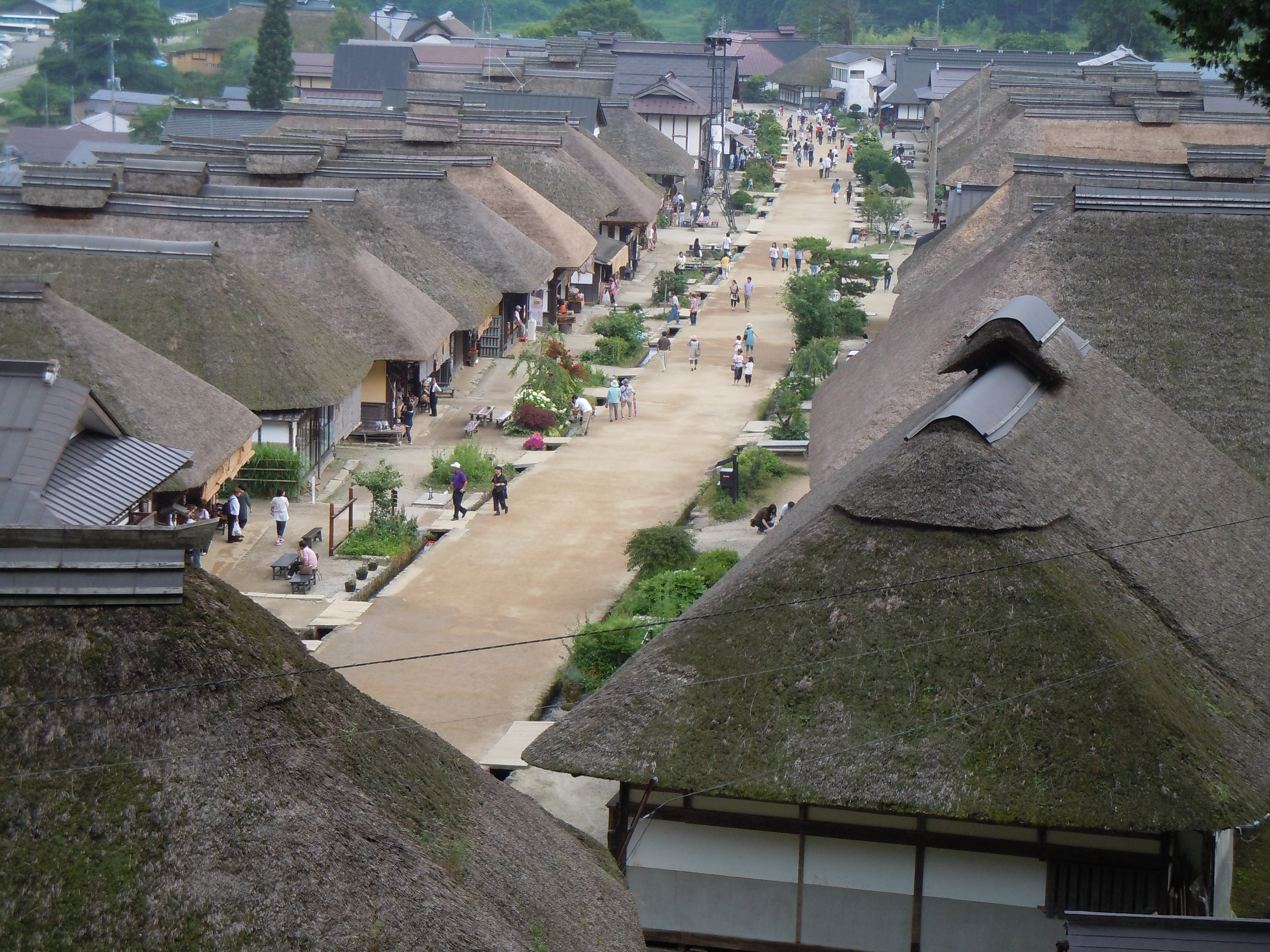

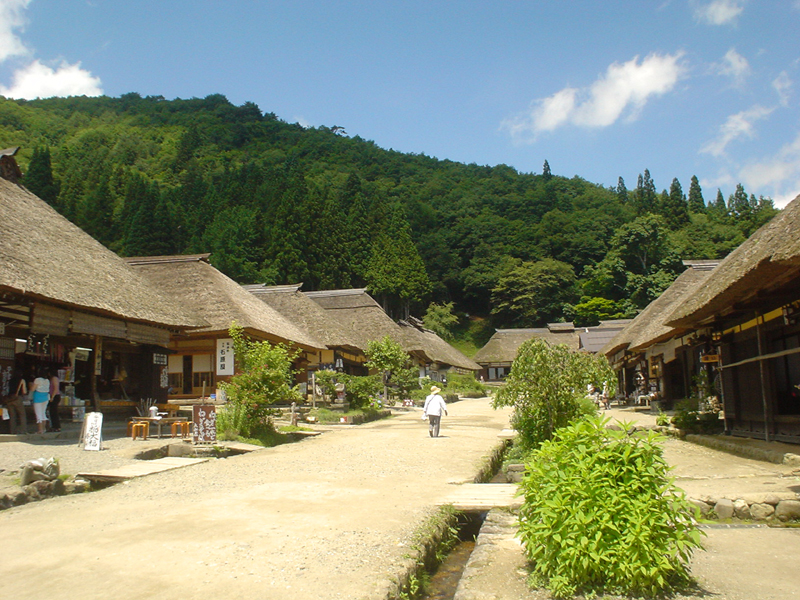

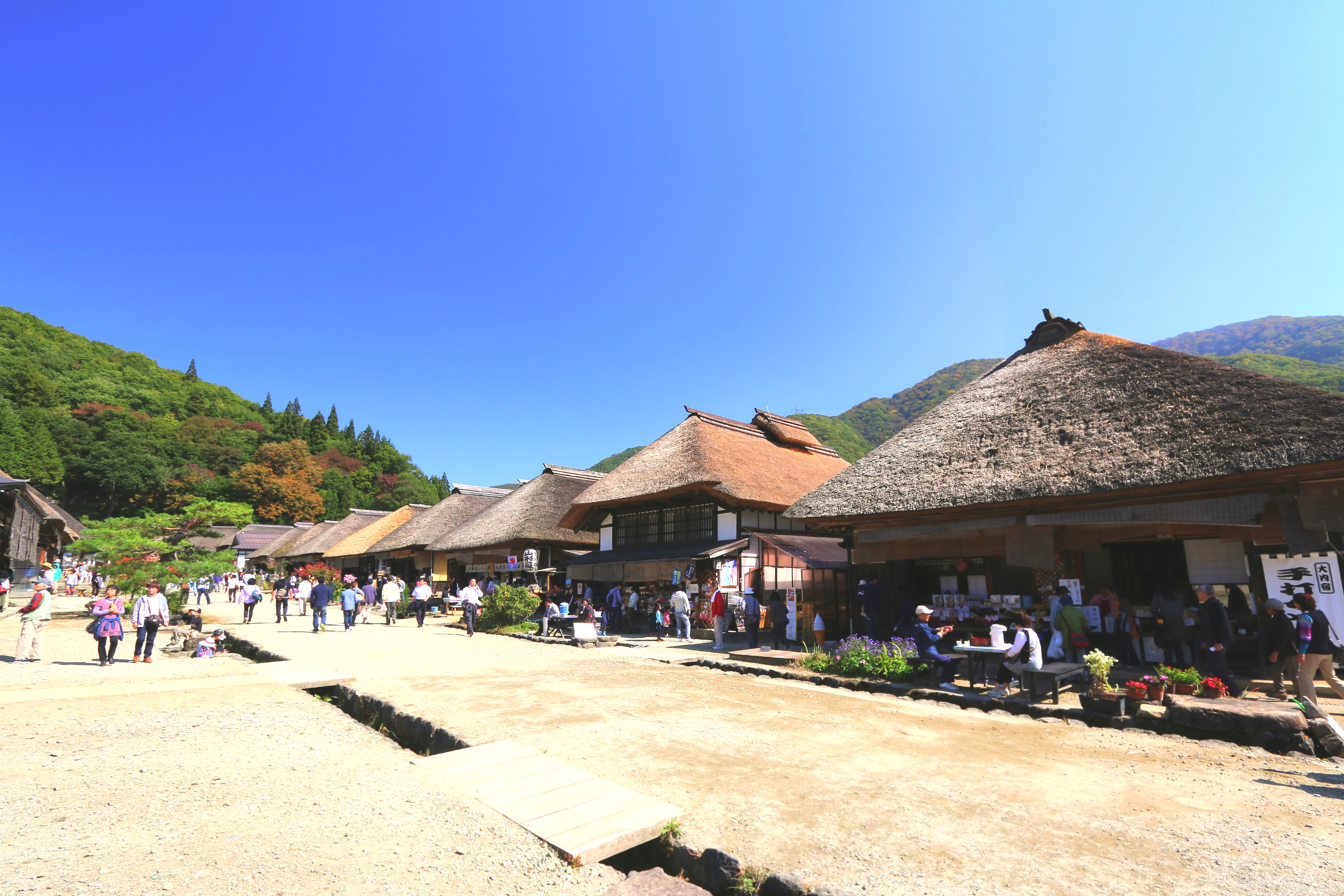

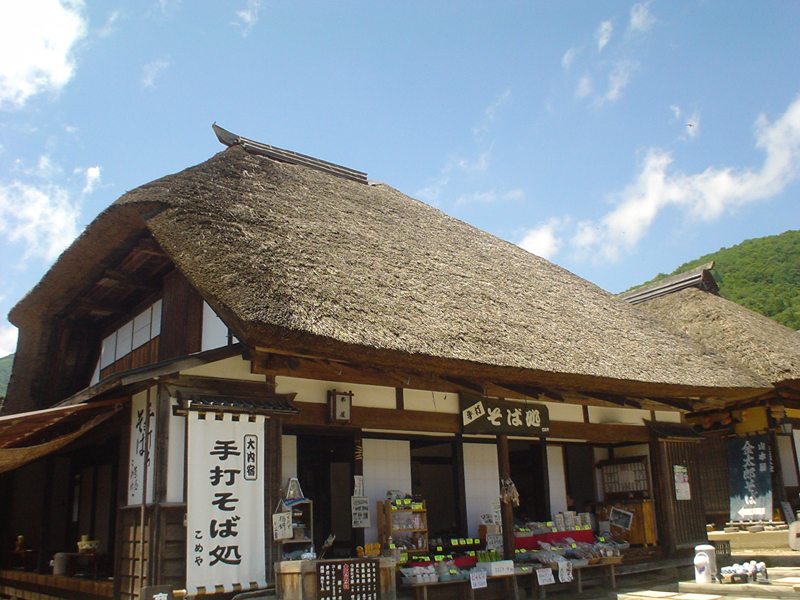
A Soba shop

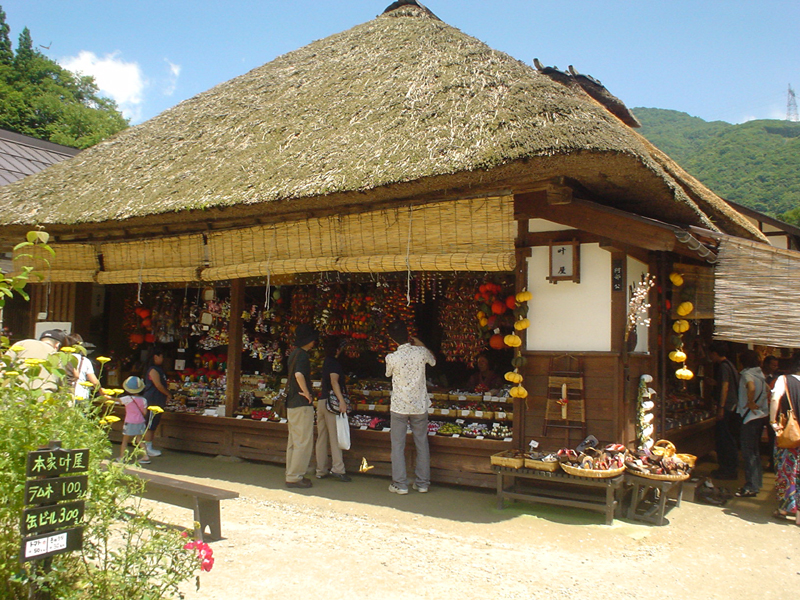

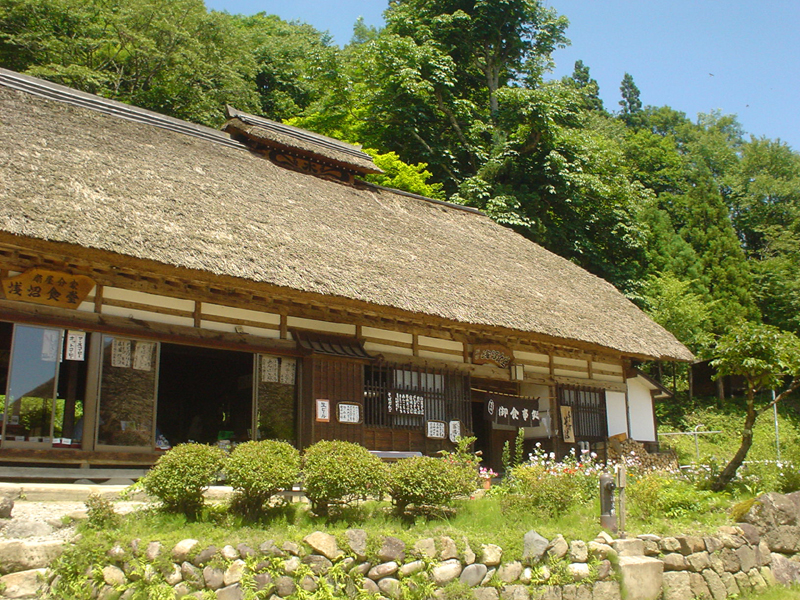

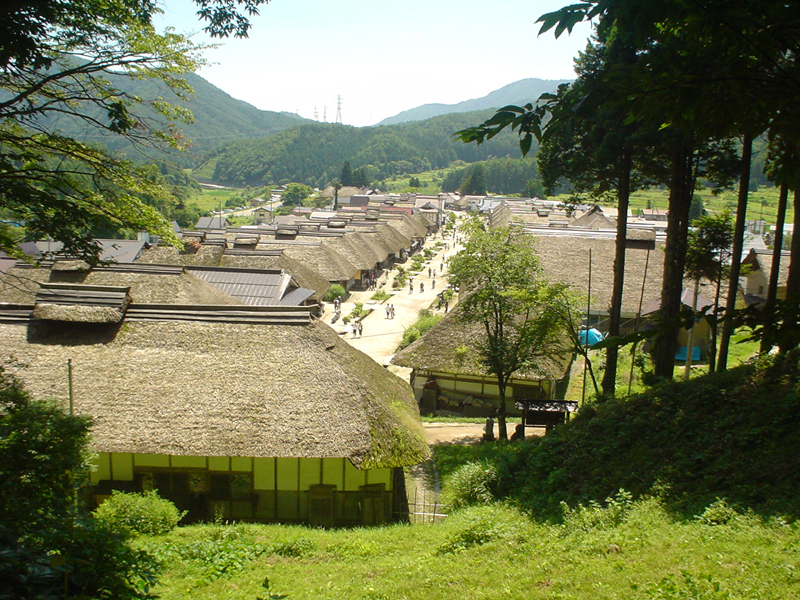

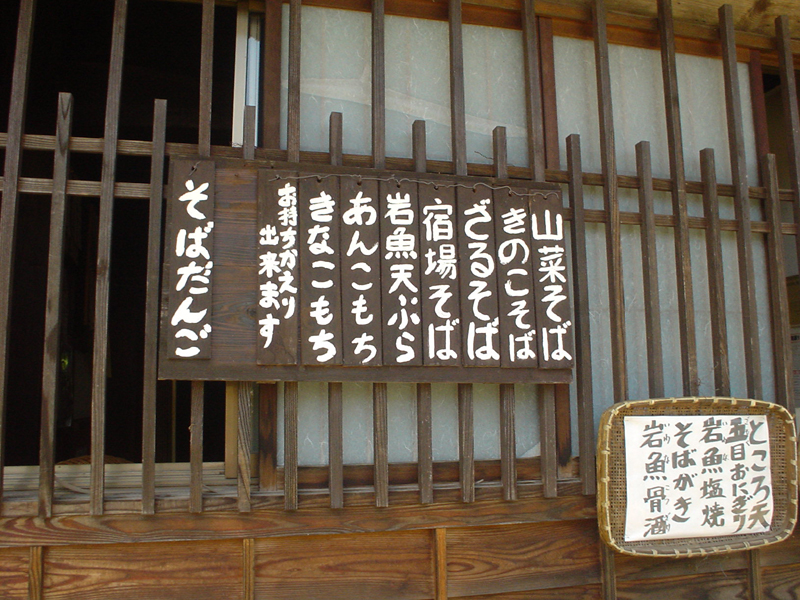

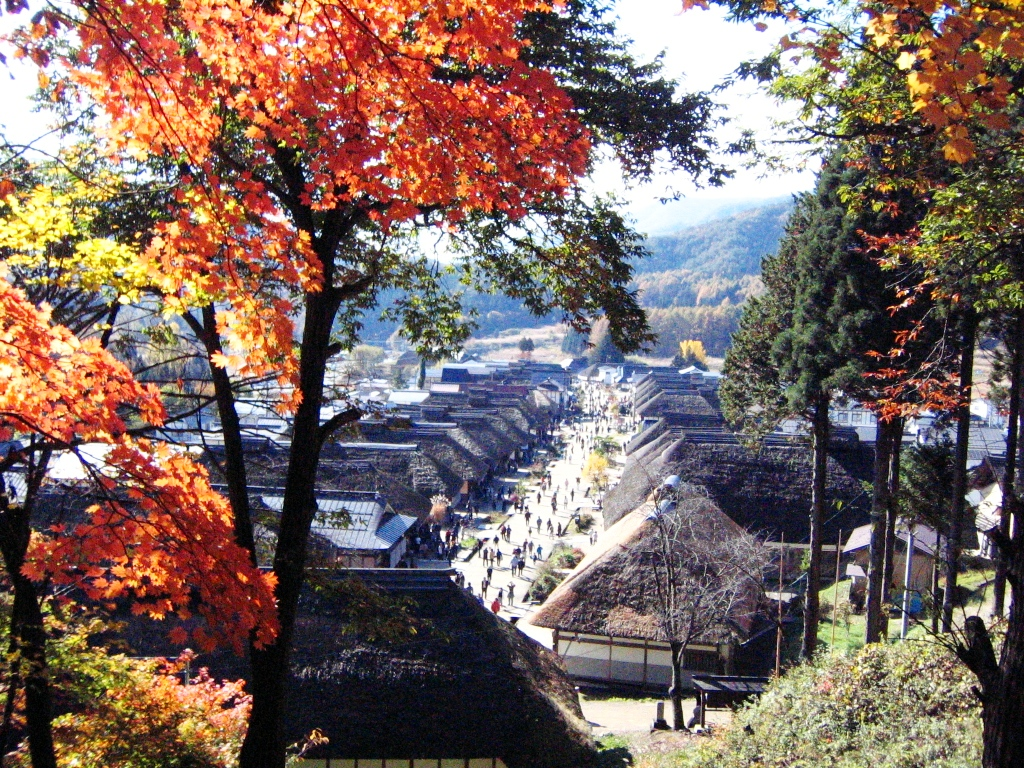

== See also ==
- Aizu Nishi Kaidō
- Simogo,Fukushima
- Groups of Traditional Buildings
- To-no-hetsuri
