= Japan National Route 120 =

National highway in Japan

National Route 120
- 国道120号
- Japan Romantic Road
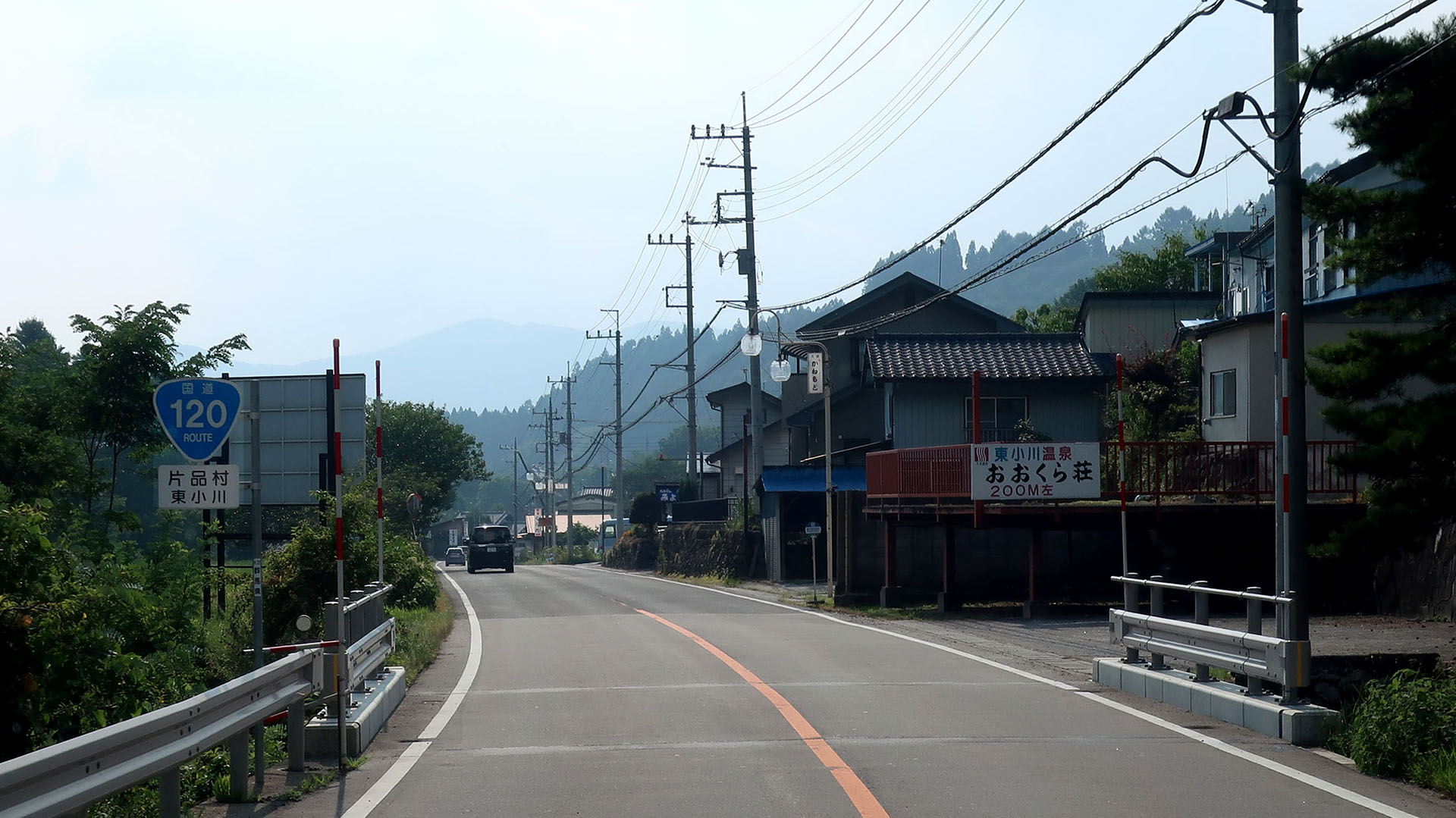

Route information
- Length: 95.2 km (59.2 mi)
- Existed: 1953–present

Major junctions
- East end: National Route 119 / Prefectural Road 247 in Nikkō, Tochigi
- West end: National Route 17 / National Route 145 in Numata, Gunma

Location
- Country: Japan

Highway system
- National highways of Japan; Expressways of Japan
← National Route 119	→ National Route 121

National Route 120 is a national highway of Japan connecting Nikkō, Tochigi and Numata, Gunma in Japan, with a total length of 95.2 km (59.15 mi). A section of the highway is designated as a part of the Japan Romantic Road.
