= Japan National Route 144 =

Road in Japan

National Route 144
- 国道144号
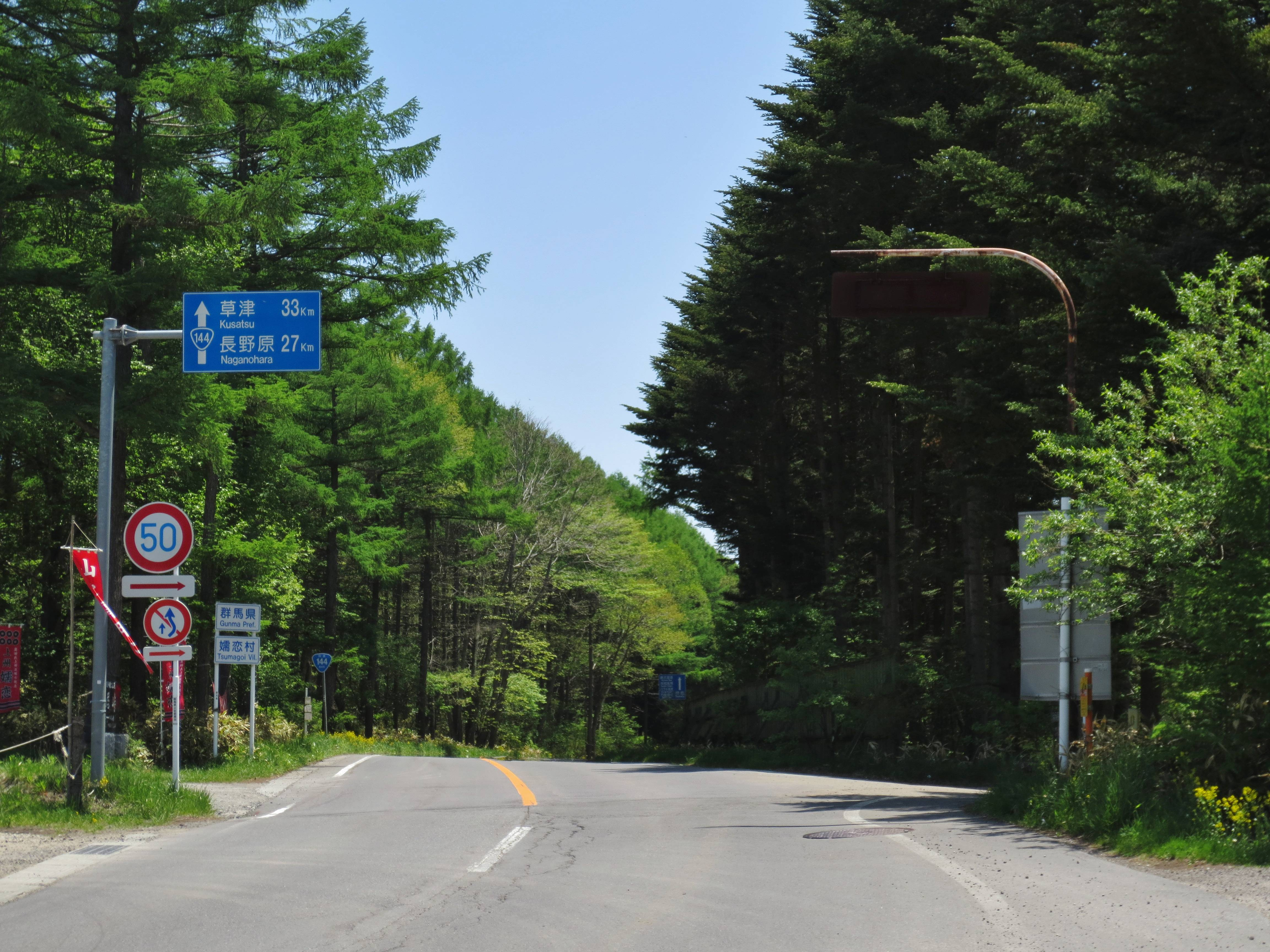

Route information
- Length: 45.3 km (28.1 mi)
- Existed: 1953–present

Major junctions
- South end: National Route 18 in Ueda, Nagano
- North end: National Route 145 / National Route 146 in Naganohara, Gunma

Location
- Country: Japan

Highway system
- National highways of Japan; Expressways of Japan
← National Route 143	→ National Route 145

National Route 144 is a national highway of Japan connecting Naganohara, Gunma and Ueda, Nagano in Japan, with a total length of 45.3 km (28.15 mi).
