= Japan National Route 146 =

Road in Japan

National Route 146
- 国道146号
- Japan Romantic Road
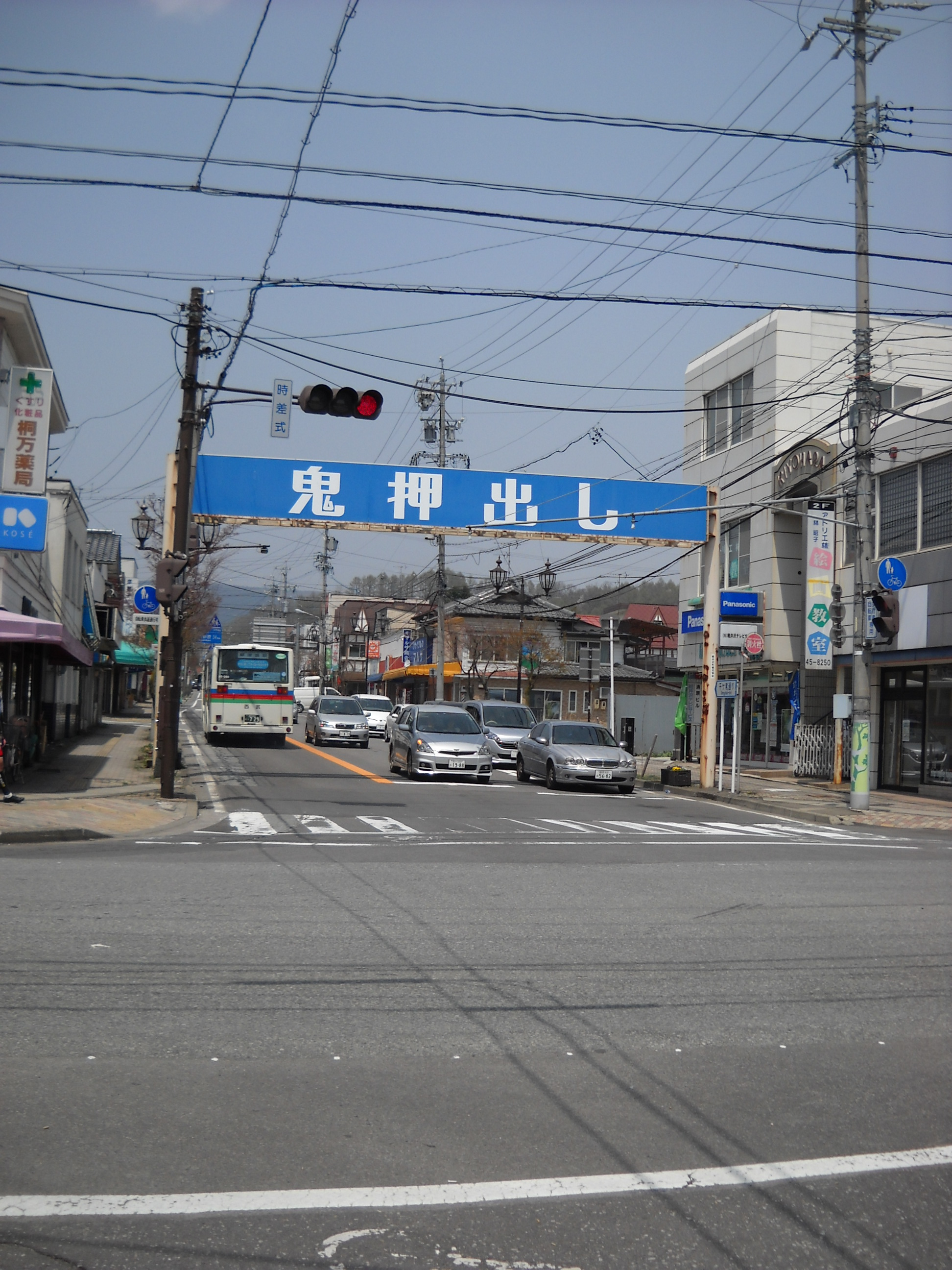
- Route 146 in Karuizawa

Route information
- Length: 30.2 km (18.8 mi)
- Existed: 1953–present

Major junctions
- South end: National Route 18 in Karuizawa, Nagano
- North end: National Route 144 / National Route 145 in Naganohara, Gunma

Location
- Country: Japan

Highway system
- National highways of Japan; Expressways of Japan
← National Route 145	→ National Route 147

National Route 146 is a national highway of Japan connecting Naganohara, Gunma and Karuizawa, Nagano in Japan, with a total length of 30.2 km (18.77 mi).
