= Japan National Route 145 =

National highway in Japan

National Route 145
- 国道145号
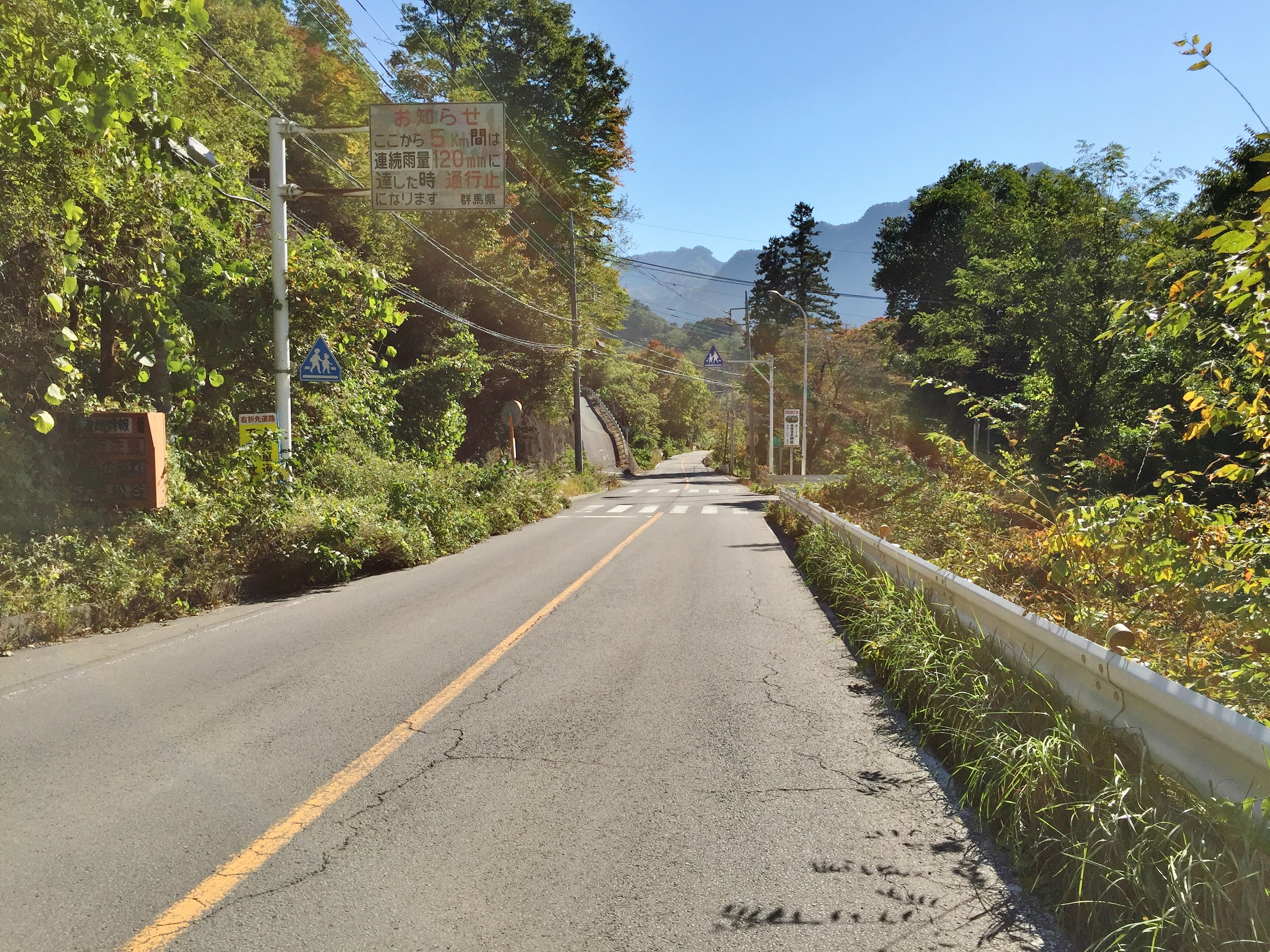

Route information
- Length: 49.8 km (30.9 mi)

Location
- Country: Japan

Highway system
- National highways of Japan; Expressways of Japan
← National Route 144	→ National Route 146

National Route 145 is a national highway of Japan connecting Naganohara, Gunma and Numata, Gunma in Japan, with a total length of 49.8 km (30.9 mi).
