= Japan National Route 121 =

National highway in Japan

National Route 121
- 国道121号
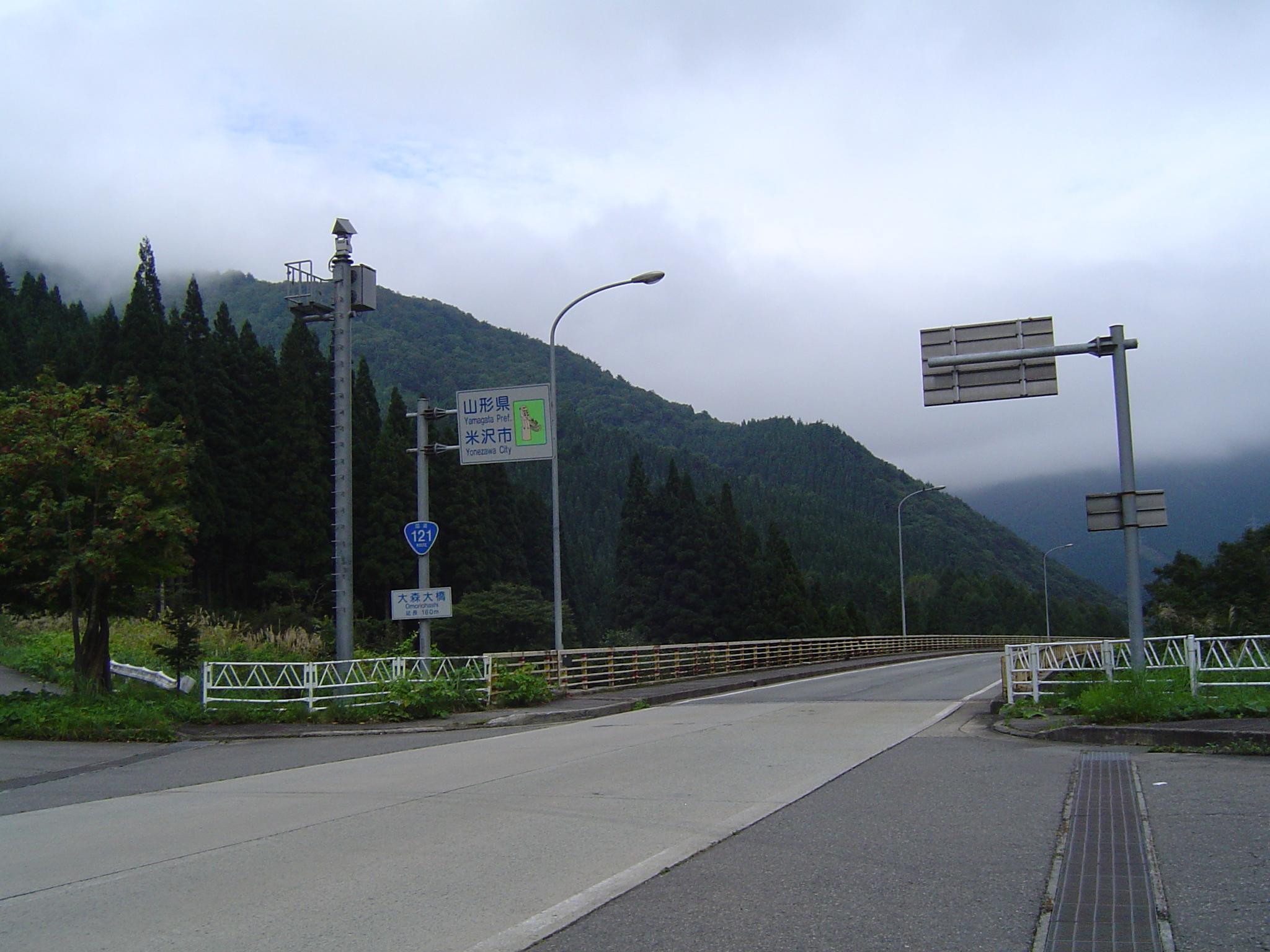

Route information
- Length: 249.6 km (155.1 mi)
- Existed: 1953–present

Major junctions
- North end: National Route 13 in Yonezawa, Yamagata
- South end: National Route 123 in Mashiko, Tochigi

Location
- Country: Japan

Highway system
- National highways of Japan; Expressways of Japan
← National Route 120	→ National Route 122

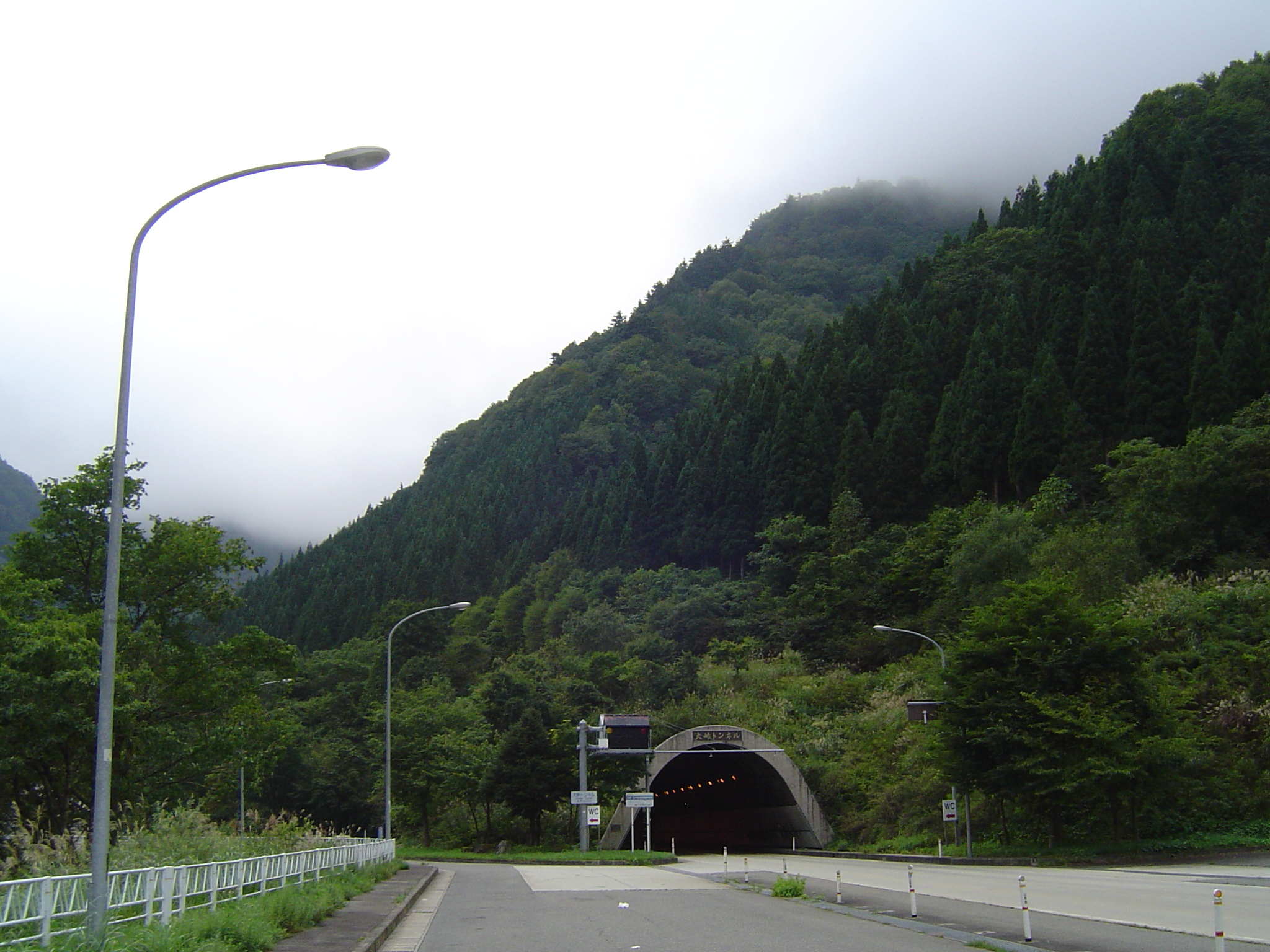
A tunnel on Route 121.

National Route 121 (国道121号, Kokudō hyaku-nijū-ichi-gō) is a national highway connecting the city of Yonezawa, Yamagata and the town of Mashiko, Tochigi in Japan.
