= Tamozawa Imperial Villa =

Garden in Nikkō, Japan

- 田母沢御用邸
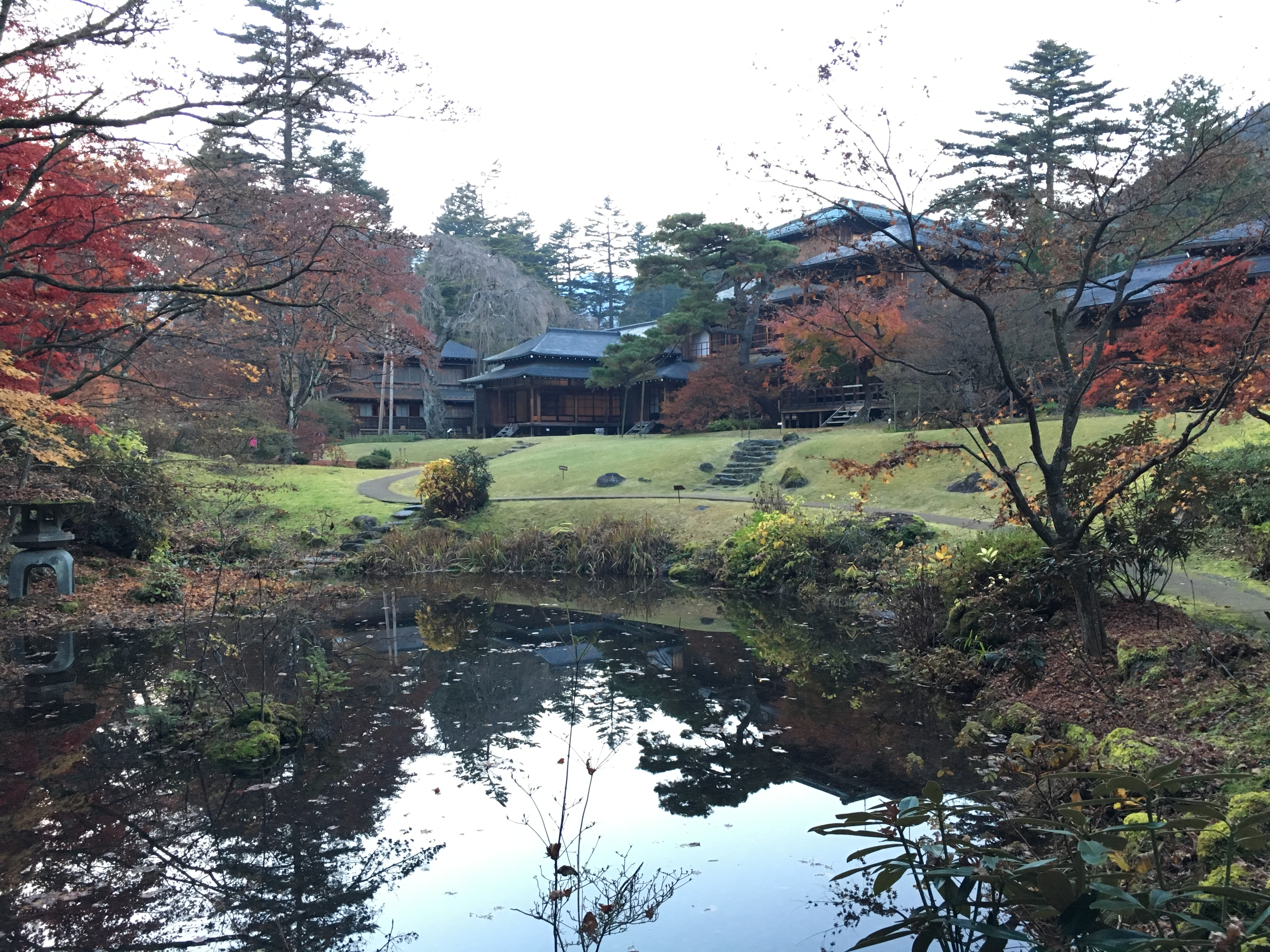
- Tamozawa Imperial Villa and garden

- Location within Japan
- Type: Urban park
- Location: Nikkō, Tochigi, Japan
- Coordinates: 36°45′09″N 139°35′29″E
- Created: 1899

Tamozawa Imperial Villa (田母沢御用邸, Tamozawa Goyōtei) is a former imperial summer residence in Nikkō, Tochigi Prefecture, Japan.

It was constructed for Emperor Taishō in 1899 and served as a hide-out for Emperor Hirohito during World War II. The former imperial residence is now open for the public as museum and garden. The villa is one of the largest wooden buildings in Japan and blends traditional Edo, early modern Meiji era and Taisho era architecture.

== History ==
The core of the Tamozawa Imperial Villa is the former Edo residence of the Kishu Tokugawa clan. Under the name ‘Akasaka Riyu’, this residence became an imperial property in 1872 and was used by both the emperor as well as the crown prince until 1898. All former Tokugawa symbols replaced with the imperial “chrysanthemum” symbol. The residence was brought over from Tokyo to Nikko in 1899, and the villa was built around it as summer residence for then crown prince Taisho. The villa also includes the villa of banker Kobayashi Nempo, on which grounds the residence is built.

During World War II, the villa was a hide-out for emperor Hirohito. Also, emperor Akihito stayed as an evacuee in the residence for more than a year starting 1944. After 1947, the imperial family did not use the villa anymore and it was soon forgotten. Not until the major renovation work by the Tochigi Prefectural Government, the villa was opened as museum for the public.

== Architecture ==
The villa is one of the largest wooden buildings of Japan, containing 106 rooms, most of which were used by the imperial court. The interior is a blend of Japanese and Western design—characterized by mixing carpet floor, chandeliers, sliding doors as well as tatami flooring. The villa is surrounded by a large park, currently only one quarter of what it was in its heyday.

== Gallery ==
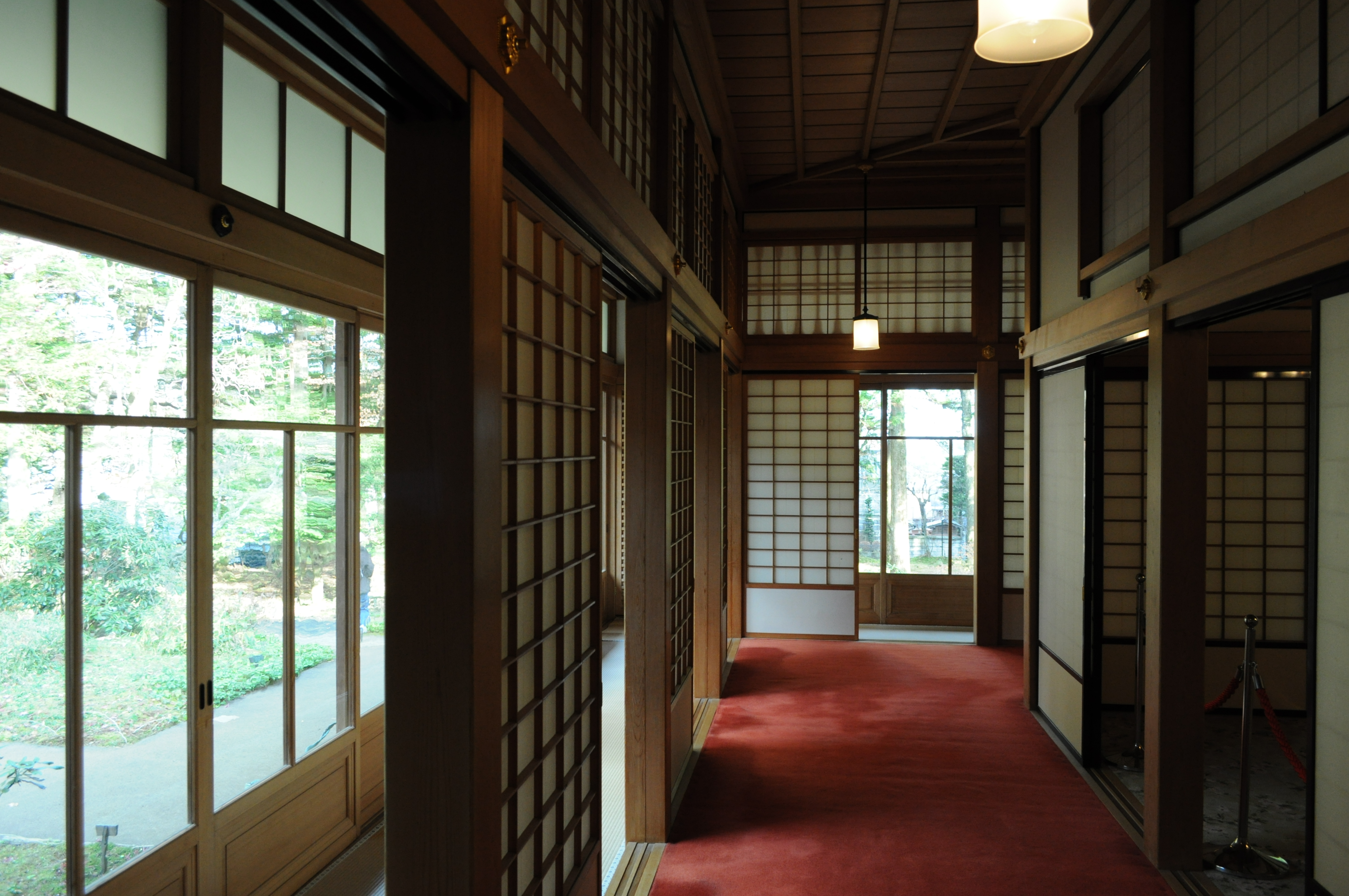
Hallway outside the throne room towards the gardens

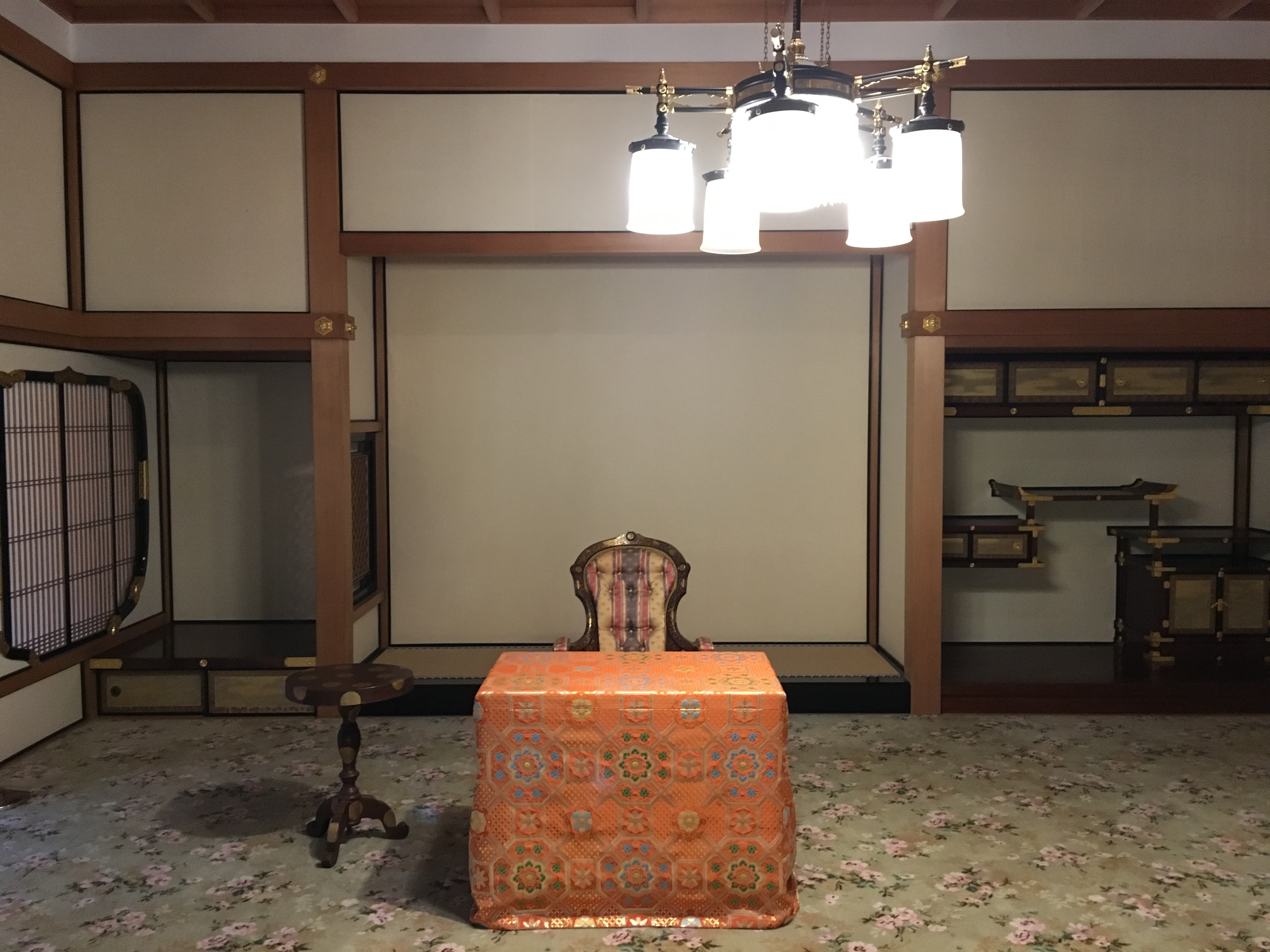
Throne room

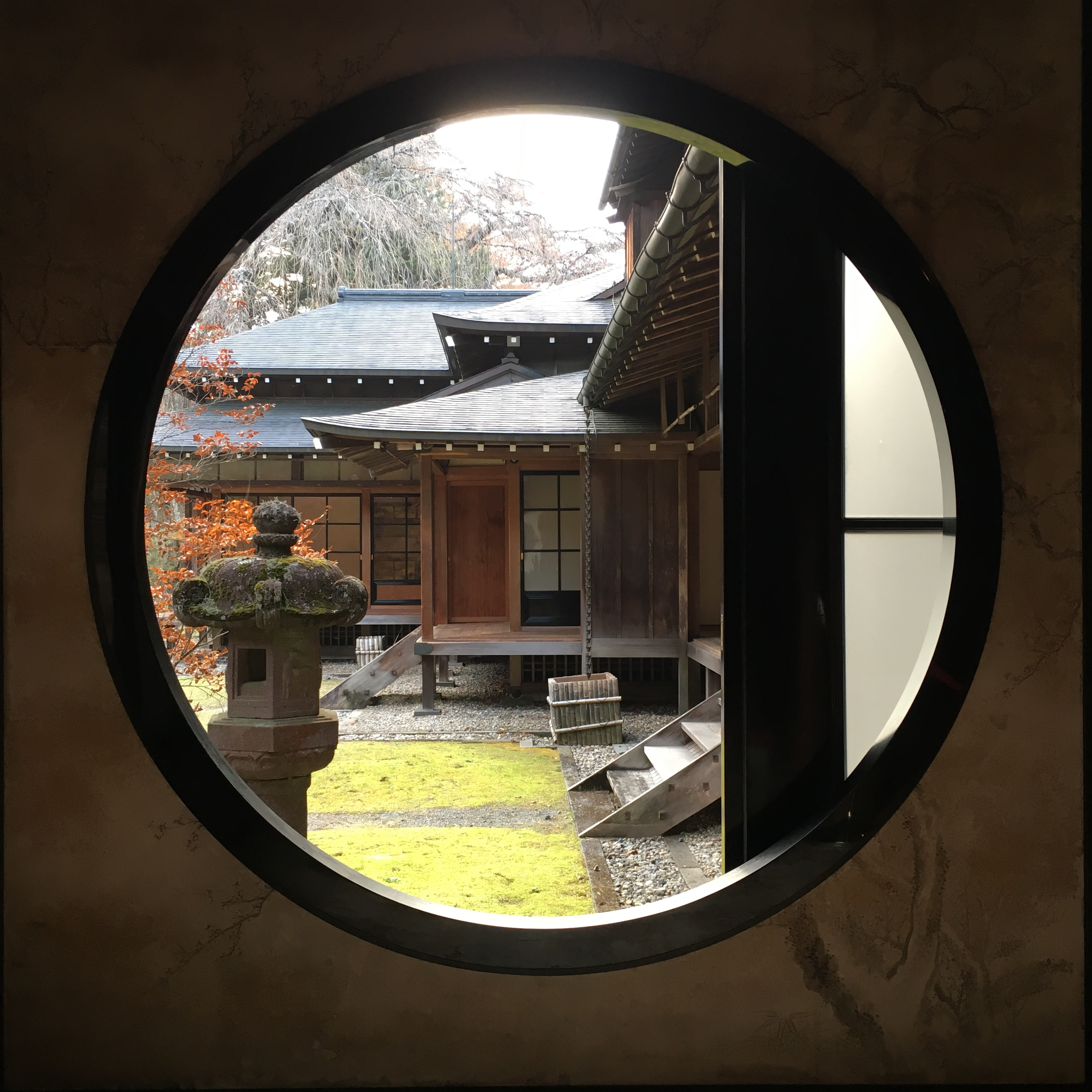
Round window in the emperor's private study

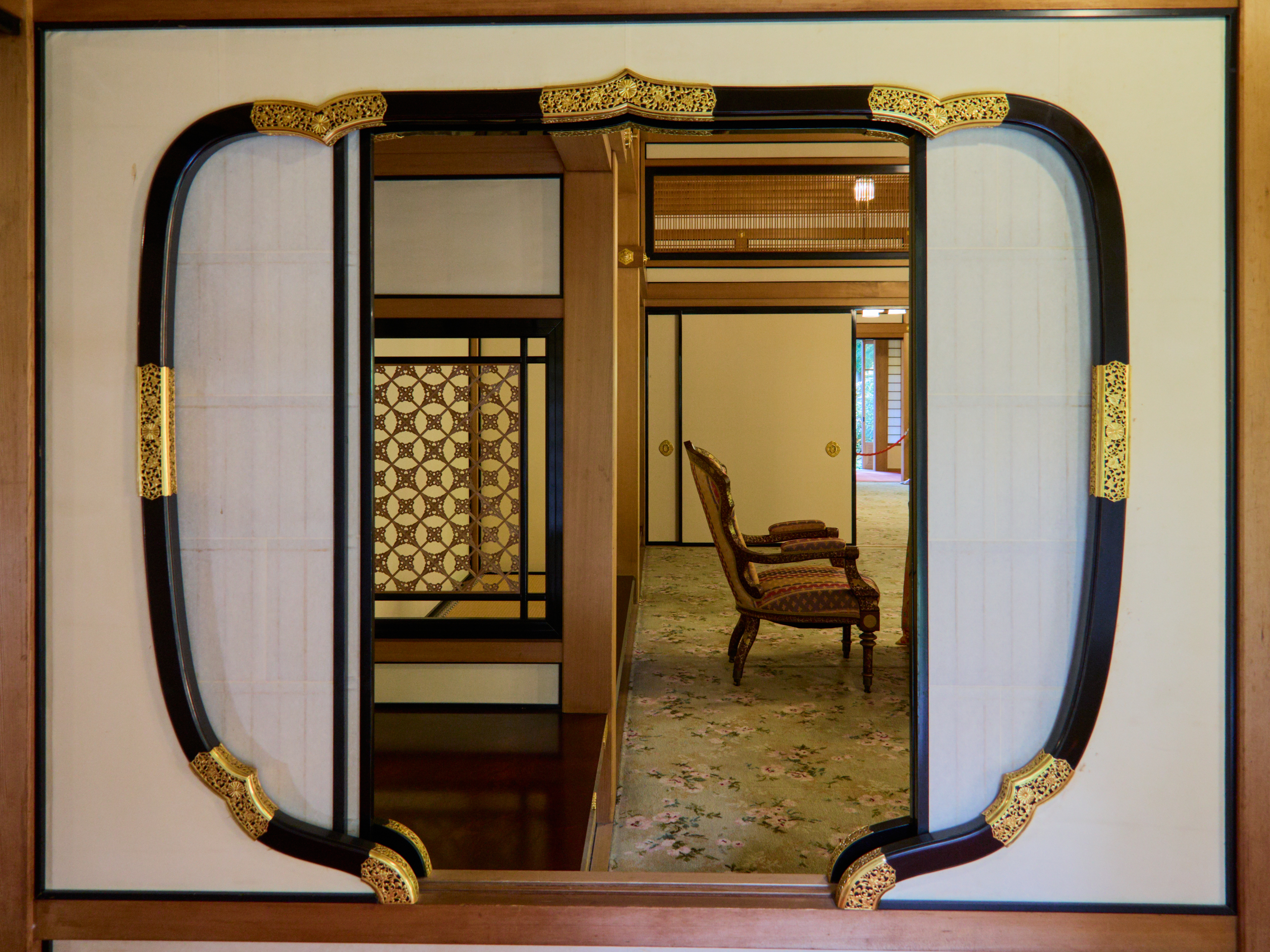
An ornate sliding door (fusuma) with lacquered black frame and gold fittings

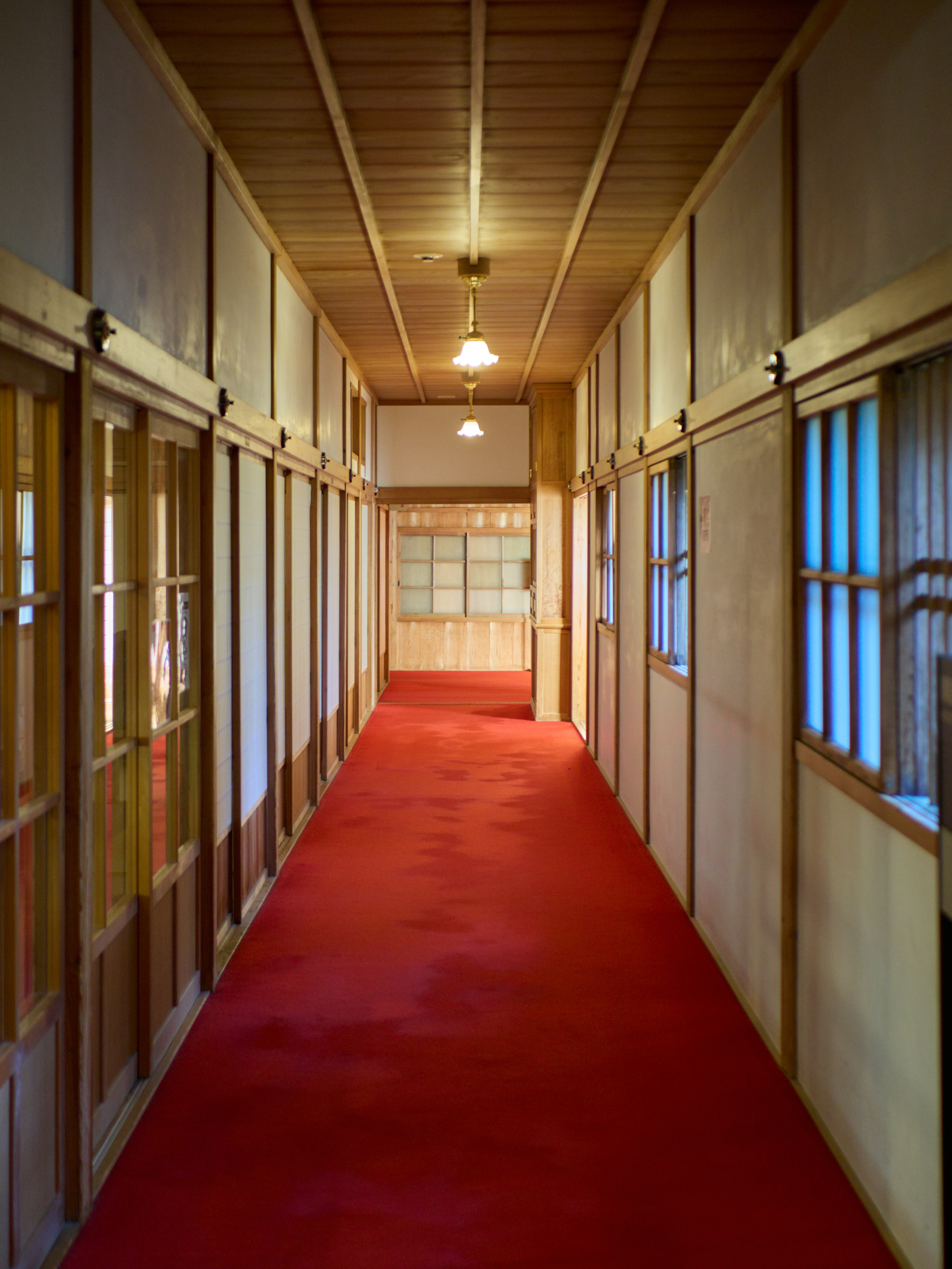
A corridor with a red carpet runner

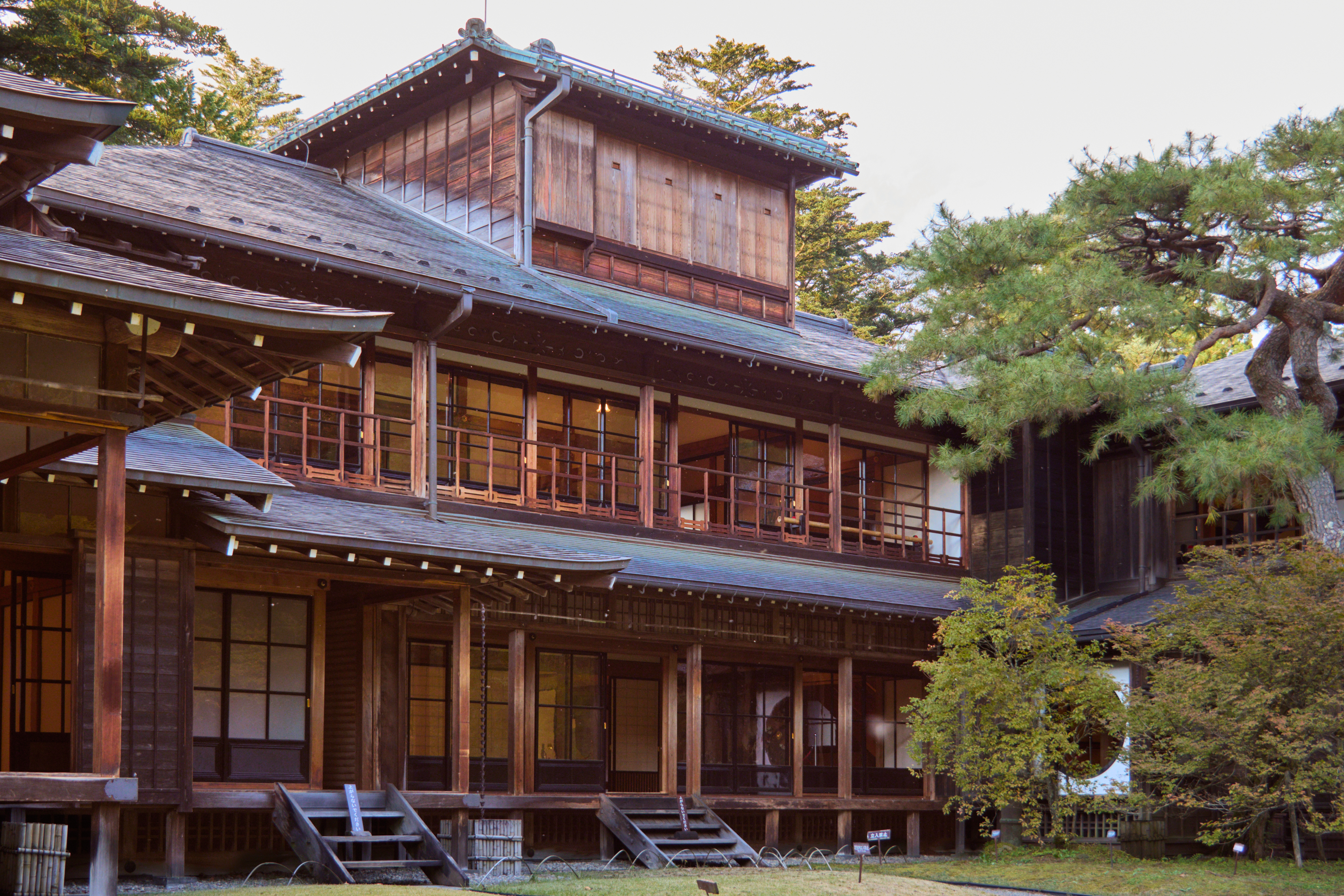
The main building of Tamozawa Imperial Villa

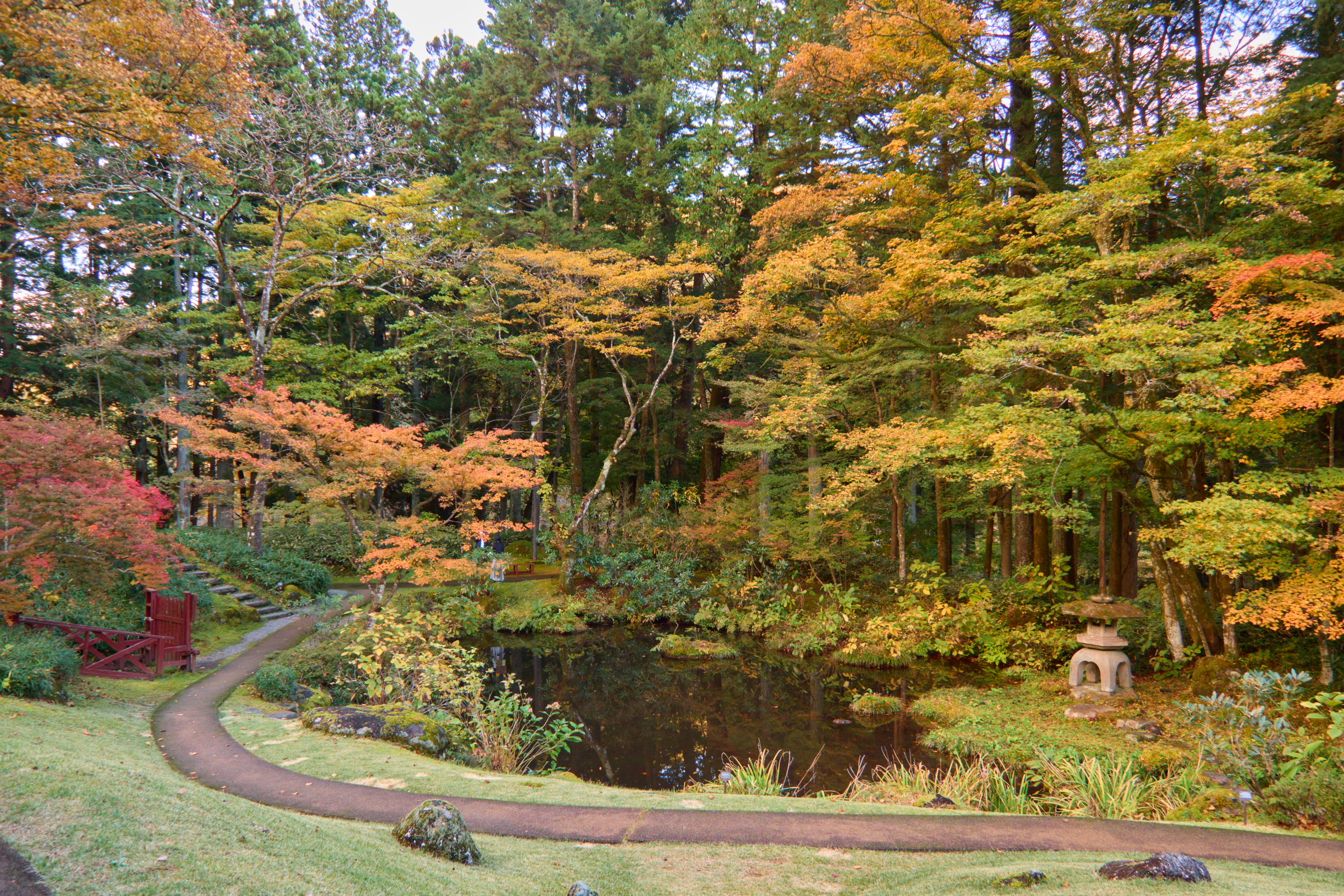
A pond and winding garden path in the grounds of Tamozawa Imperial Villa during autumn

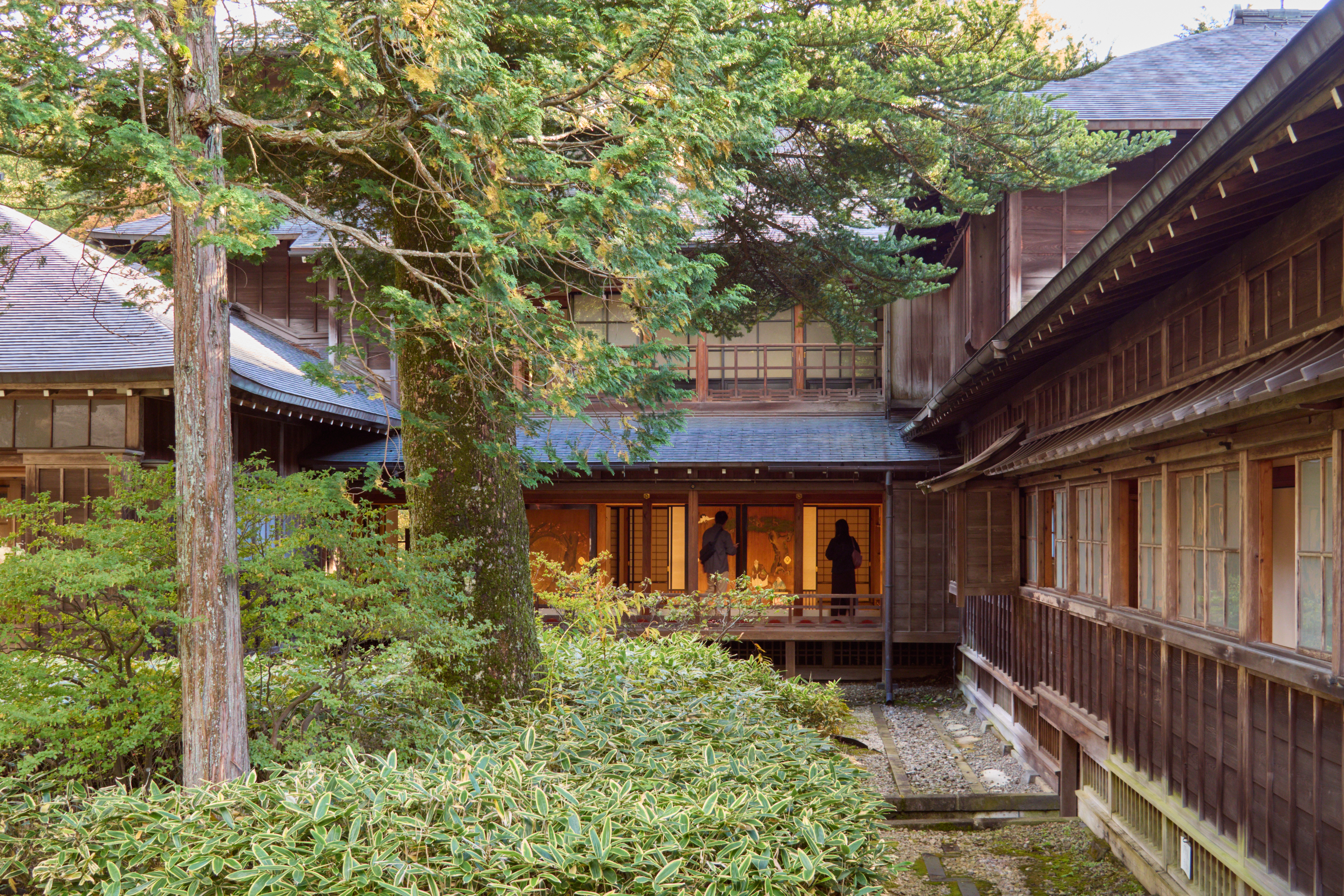
The inner courtyard garden

== Bibliography ==
- https://www.park-tochigi.com/tamozawa/wp/wp-content/uploads/2016/07/tamozawa_gaikoku.pdf
