= Shin-Ōhirashita Station =

Railway station in Tochigi, Tochigi Prefecture, Japan

TN10 Shin-Ōhirashita Station 新大平下駅
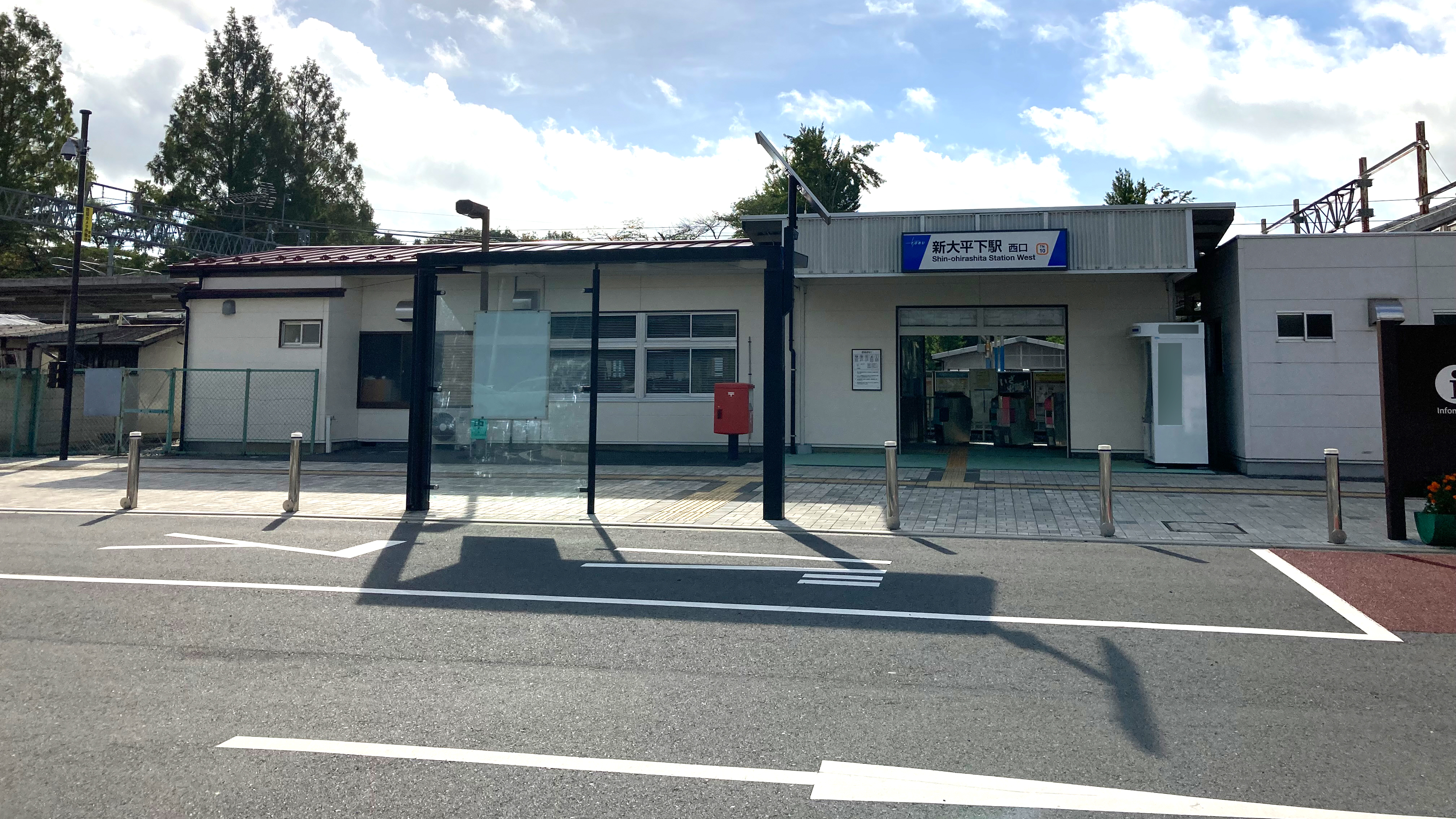
- Shin-Ōhirashita Station west exit in August 2021

General information
- Location: 571-2 Tomita Ōhira-machi, Tochigi-shi, Tochigi-ken 329-4404; Japan
- Coordinates: 36.3388°N 139.7021°E
- Operator: Tobu Railway
- Line: Tobu Nikko Line
- Distance: 40.1 km from Tōbu-Dōbutsu-Kōen
- Platforms: 2 island platforms

Other information
- Station code: TN-10
- Website: Official website

History
- Opened: 1 November 1931

Passengers
- FY2020: 2722 daily

Services
| Preceding station | Tobu Railway | Following station |
|---|---|---|
| Itakura Tōyōdai-mae TN07 towards Minami-Kurihashi | Nikkō Line Express | Tochigi TN11 towards Tōbu–Nikkō |
| Shizuwa TN09 towards Tōbu-Dōbutsu-Kōen | Nikkō Line Local | Tochigi TN11 towards Tōbu–Nikkō |
Location
- Location within Tochigi Prefecture Location within Japan

Shin-Ōhirashita Station (新大平下駅, Shin-Ōhirashita-eki) is a railway station in the city of Tochigi, Tochigi, Japan, operated by the private railway operator Tōbu Railway. The station is numbered "TN-10".

== Lines ==
Shin-Ōhirashita Station is served by the Tōbu Nikkō Line, and is 40.1 km from the starting point of the line at Tōbu-Dōbutsu-Kōen.

== Station layout ==
This station consists of two island platforms serving four tracks, connected to the station building by a footbridge.

=== Platforms ===
| 1, 2 | ■ Tōbu Nikkō Line | for Shin-Tochigi and Tōbu-Nikkō |
| 3, 4 | ■ Tōbu Nikkō Line | for Minami-Kurihashi and Tōbu-Dōbutsu-Kōen |

== History ==
Shin-Ōhirashita Station opened on 1 November 1931.

From 17 March 2012, station numbering was introduced on all Tōbu lines, with Shin-Ōhirashita Station becoming "TN-10".

== Passenger statistics ==
In fiscal 2019, the station was used by an average of 2722 passengers daily (boarding passengers only).

== Surrounding area ==
- Former Ōhira town hall
- Ōhira Post Office
- Ōhira Culture Center
- Ōhira Public Library
- Ōhira Sports Center

== See also ==
- List of railway stations in Japan
