= Goka =

Town in Ibaraki Prefecture, Japan

Goka 五霞町
- Town
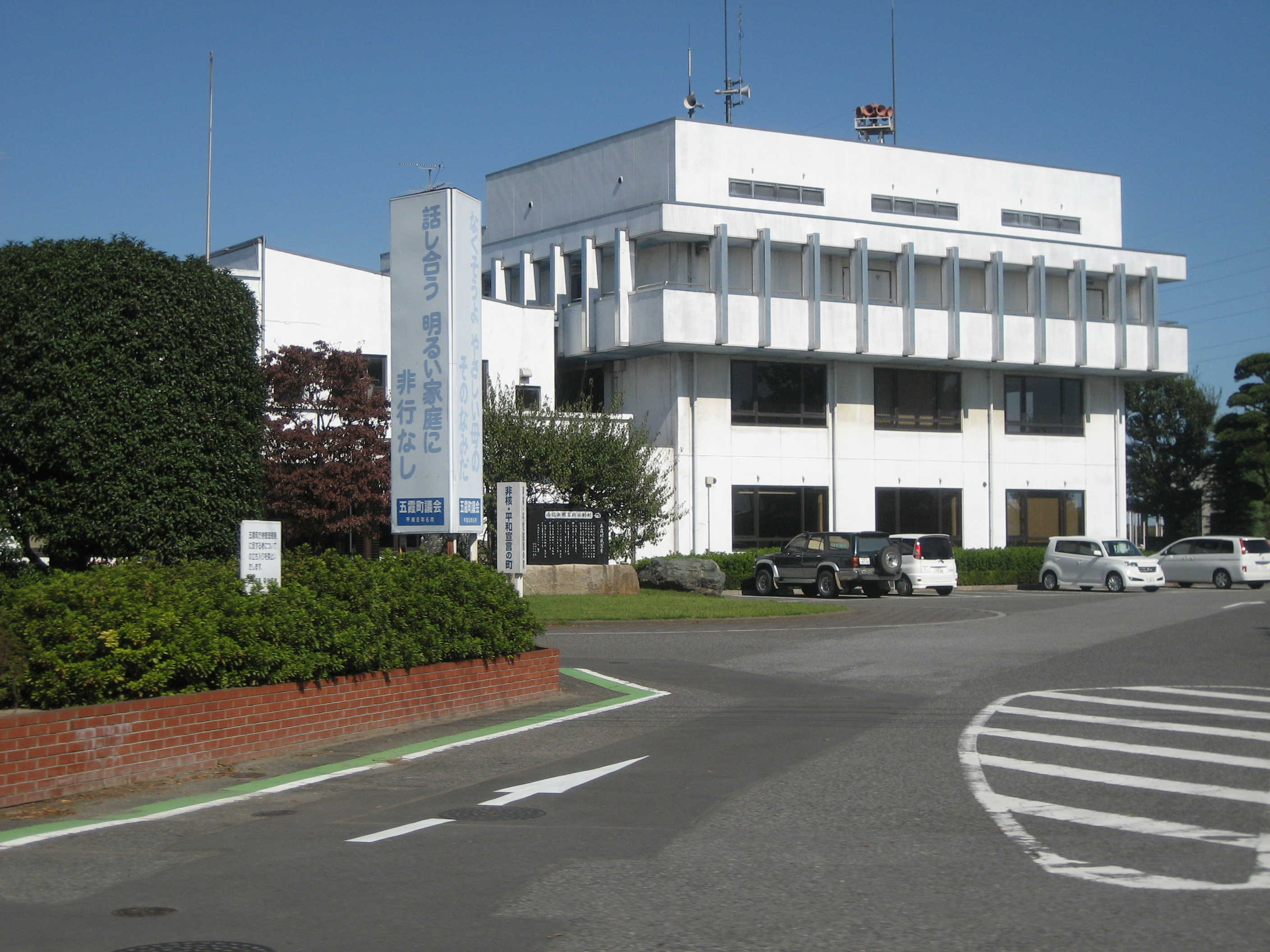
- Goka Town Hall

- Flag Seal

- Location of Goka in Ibaraki Prefecture

- Coordinates: 36°06′52″N 139°44′42.5″E
- Country: Japan
- Region: Kanto
- Prefecture: Ibaraki
- District: Sashima

Government
  - Mayor: Chiku Kiyoshi

Area
  - Total: 23.11 km^{2} (8.92 sq mi)

Population (January 2020)
  - Total: 8,162
  - Density: 353.2/km^{2} (914.7/sq mi)
- Time zone: UTC+9 (Japan Standard Time)
- Postal code: 30603
- Area code: 0280
- Tree: Prunus mume
- Flower: Canna
- Bird: Eurasian skylark
- Phone number: 0280-84-1111
- Address: 1162-1 Kofukuda, Goka-machi, Sashima-gun, Ibaraki-ken 306-0392
- Website: Official website

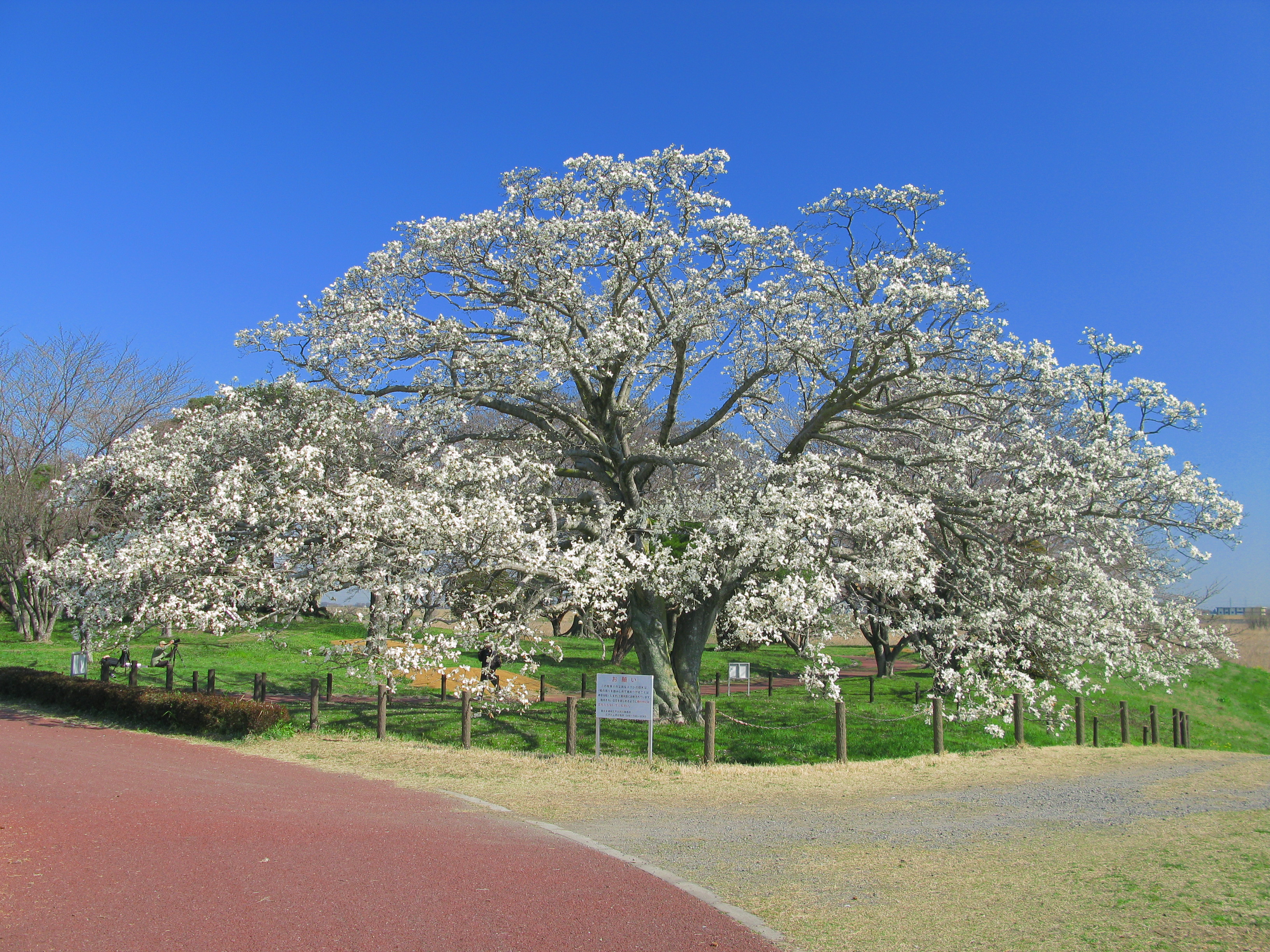
Nakanoshima Park

Goka (五霞町, Goka-machi) is a town located in Ibaraki Prefecture, Japan. As of 1 October 2020, the town had an estimated population of 8,162 in 2987 households and a population density of 353 persons per km^{2}. The percentage of the population aged over 65 was 34.7%. The total area of the city is 23.11 square kilometres (8.92 sq mi).

== Geography ==
Goka is located in the flatlands in the very western portion of Ibaraki Prefecture, bordered by Saitama Prefecture to the west and south, Chiba Prefecture to the east. The Tone River, along with the Edo River and Naka River pass through the town. Goka is approximately 50 kilometers from central Tokyo.

=== Rivers ===
- Tone River
- Edo River
- Naka River
- Gongendo River(Lake Miyuki)
- Fuyugi-otoshi River
- Goka-otoshi River

=== Place names ===
- Motokurihashi
- Kawatsuma
- Kotesashi
- Shinkōya
- Kofukuda
- Ōfukuda
- Sanno-yama
- Sanno
- Egawa
- Kōshu
- Goka-mirai
- Fuyugi
- Maebayashi
- Shaka
- Harajukudai

=== Neighboring municipalities ===
Chiba Prefecture

- Noda

Ibaraki Prefecture

- Koga
- Sakai

Saitama Prefecture

- Kuki
- Satte

=== Climate ===
Goka has a Humid continental climate (Köppen Cfa) characterized by warm summers and cool winters with light snowfall. The average annual temperature in Goka is 14.5 °C. The average annual rainfall is 1326 mm with September as the wettest month. The temperatures are highest on average in August, at around 26.6 °C, and lowest in January, at around 3.4 °C.

== Demographics ==
Per Japanese census data, the population of Goka peaked around the year 2000 and has declined since.

Historical population
Year	Pop.	±%
1920	7,278	—
1930	7,543	+3.6%
1940	7,747	+2.7%
1950	9,985	+28.9%
1960	9,157	−8.3%
1970	8,382	−8.5%
1980	8,645	+3.1%
1990	9,468	+9.5%
2000	10,218	+7.9%
2010	9,410	−7.9%
2020	8,093	−14.0%

== History ==
The area of present-day Goka was part of Shimōsa Province and was transferred to Ibaraki Prefecture in 1875 after the start of the Meiji period. The area was organized into the village of Goka within Nishikatsushika District, Ibaraki with the establishment of the modern municipalities system on 1 April 1889. The district was abolished in 1896, becoming part of Sashima District. Goka was raised to town status on 1 June 1996.

== Government ==
Goka has a mayor-council form of government with a directly elected mayor and a unicameral town council of 10 members. Goka, together with neighboring Bandō and Sakai, contributes two members to the Ibaraki Prefectural Assembly. In terms of national politics, the town is part of Ibaraki 7th district of the lower house of the Diet of Japan.

== Economy ==
=== Industrial park ===
- Doyobu, Kawatsuma, Egawa, Ōsaki, Ondashi and Goka IC industrial park

=== Company office and plant ===
- KATO WORKS Company Limited, Ibaraki plant
- Kewpie Corporation, Goka plant
- KIKKOMAN SoyFoods Company, Ibaraki plant
- Kyodo Printing Company Limited, Goka plant
- SHINCHOSHA Publishing Company Limited, Goka Office
- Yakult Honsha Company Limited, Ibaraki plant

== Public institutions ==
=== Education ===
Goka has one public elementary school and one public middle school operated by the town government. The town does not have a high school.

- Goka-nishi elementary school
- Goka-higashi elementary school
- Goka junior high school

=== Public facilities ===
- Goka town hall
- Goka post office
- Goka Harajukudai post office
- Goka town B&G Marine center
- Environmental purification center
- Kawatsuma water purification plant

=== Fire department ===
- Koga fire department(Koga-city)
  - Goka branch

=== Police department ===
- Ibaraki prefectural police, Sakai police station(Sakai-town)
  - Motokurihashi police box
  - Kofukuda police box

== Transportation ==
=== Railway ===
Goka does not have any passenger railway service. The near station is Kurihashi on the JR East's Utsunomiya Line(Tohoku Main Line) and Minami-kurihashi or Satte on the Tōbu Nikkō Line.
Tohoku Shinkansen pass through northern part of the town.

=== Expressway ===
- Ken-Ō Expressway – Goka Interchange

=== Highway ===
- National Route 4
  - Roadside station Goka (government-designated rest area)

=== Prefectural road ===
- Prefecture Route 267
- Prefecture Route 268

=== Bus ===
- Route Bus (operated by Asahi bus)
  - Goka town hall – Tatsudō – Satte station
- Community transportation "Gokarin-go" (operated by Asahi bus, operation route depending on the time of day except Sunday and holidays)
  - Minami-kurihashi station – Saiseikai Kurihashi Hospital – Goka town hall – Goka Egawa-honson (Morning and evening time route)
  - Beisia Supermarket Kurihashi Store – Minami-kurihashi station – Saiseikai Kurihashi Hospital – Goka town hall – Motokurihashi-ikenari – Dōmu Park – Tatsudō – Roadside station Goka – Goka Egawa-honson(Daytime route)

== Local attractions ==
- Kurihashi castle ruins
- Tōshōji temple
- Ana-yakushi ancient tomb
- Fuyugi A・B shellmound
- Nakanoshima Park
- Dōmu Park
- Roadside station Goka
- Information and disaster station Goka
