= Itakura Tōyōdai-mae Station =

Railway station in Itakura, Gunma Prefecture, Japan

TN07 Itakura Tōyōdai-mae Station 板倉東洋大前駅
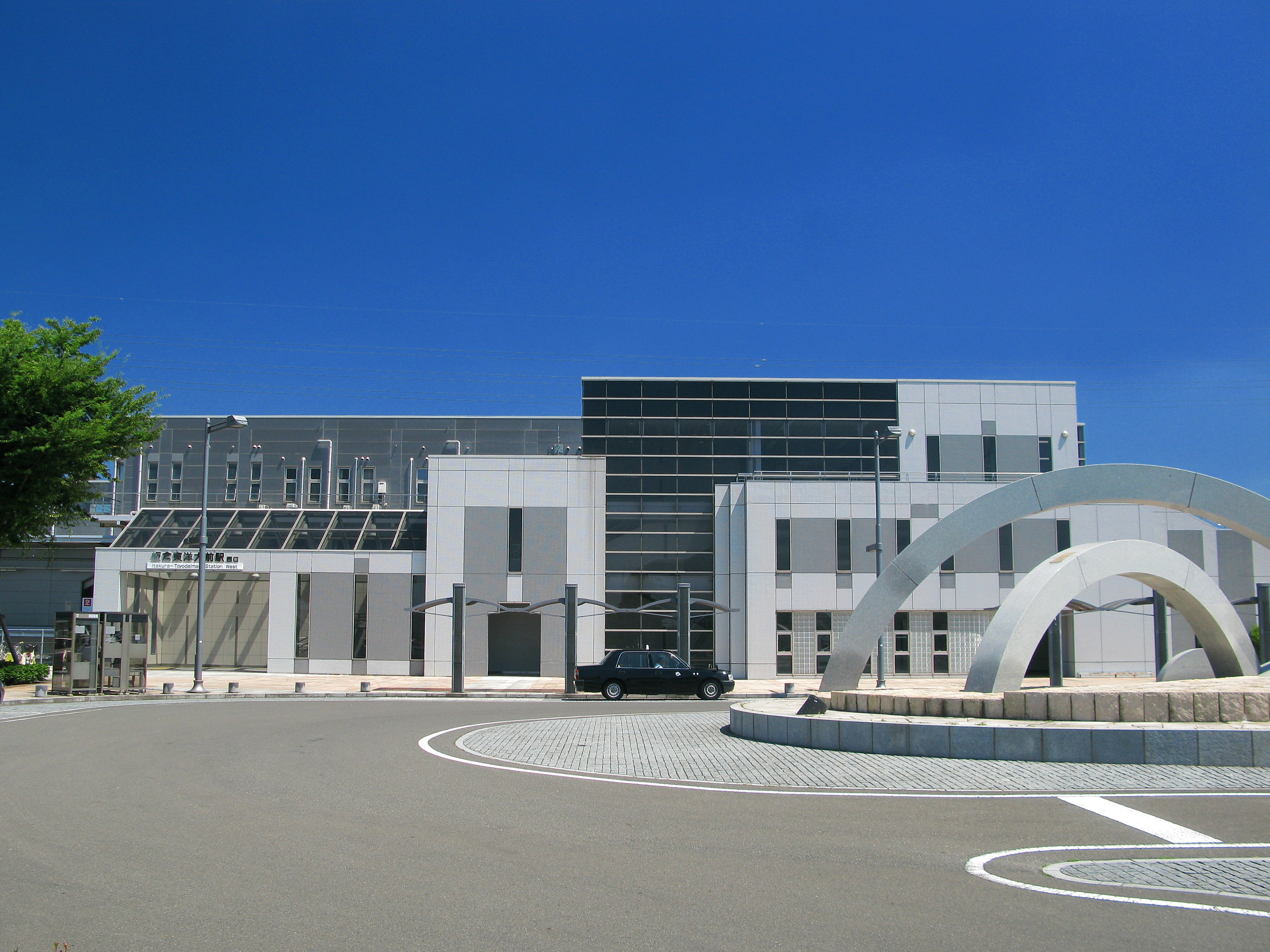
- Itakura Tōyōdai-mae Station in August 2012

General information
- Location: 1-1-1 Asahino, Itakura-machi, Ōra-gun, Gunma-ken 374-0112; Japan
- Coordinates: 36.2224°N 139.6482°E
- Operator: Tōbu Railway
- Line: Tōbu Nikkō Line
- Distance: 25.6 km from Tōbu-Dōbutsu-Kōen
- Platforms: 2 island platforms
- Tracks: 4

Other information
- Station code: TN-07
- Website: Official website

History
- Opened: 25 March 1997

Passengers
- FY2019: 3,819 daily

Services
Preceding station	Tobu Railway	Following station
Kurihashi TN04 towards Minami-Kurihashi	Nikkō Line Express	Shin-Ōhirashita TN10 towards Tōbu–Nikkō
Yagyū TN06 towards Tōbu-Dōbutsu-Kōen	Nikkō Line Local	Fujioka TN08 towards Tōbu–Nikkō
Location
- Location within Gunma Prefecture Location within Japan

Itakura Tōyōdai-mae Station (板倉東洋大前駅, Itakura Tōyōdai-mae-eki) is a passenger railway station in the town of Itakura, Gunma, Japan, operated by the private railway operator Tōbu Railway. The station is numbered "TN-07".

== Lines ==
Itakura Tōyōdai-mae Station is served by Tōbu Nikkō Line, and is 25.6 km (15.9 mi) from the starting point of the line at Tōbu-Dōbutsu-Kōen.

== Station layout ==
This station consists of two elevated island platforms serving four tracks, with the station building located underneath. Tracks 1 and 4 are on passing loops.

=== Platforms ===
1, 2	■ Tōbu Nikkō Line	for Minami-Kurihashi and Tōbu-Dōbutsu-Kōen
3, 4	■ Tōbu Nikkō Line	for Shin-Tochigi and Tōbu-Nikkō

== History ==
Itakura Tōyōdai-mae Station opened on 25 March 1997.

From 17 March 2012, station numbering was introduced on all Tōbu lines, with Itakura Tōyōdai-mae Station becoming "TN-07".

== Passenger statistics ==
In fiscal 2019, the station was used by an average of 3819 passengers daily (boarding passengers only).

== Surrounding area ==
- Toyo University Itakura campus

== See also ==
- List of railway stations in Japan
