= Shizuwa Station =

Railway station in Tochigi, Tochigi Prefecture, Japan

TN09 Shizuwa Station 静和駅
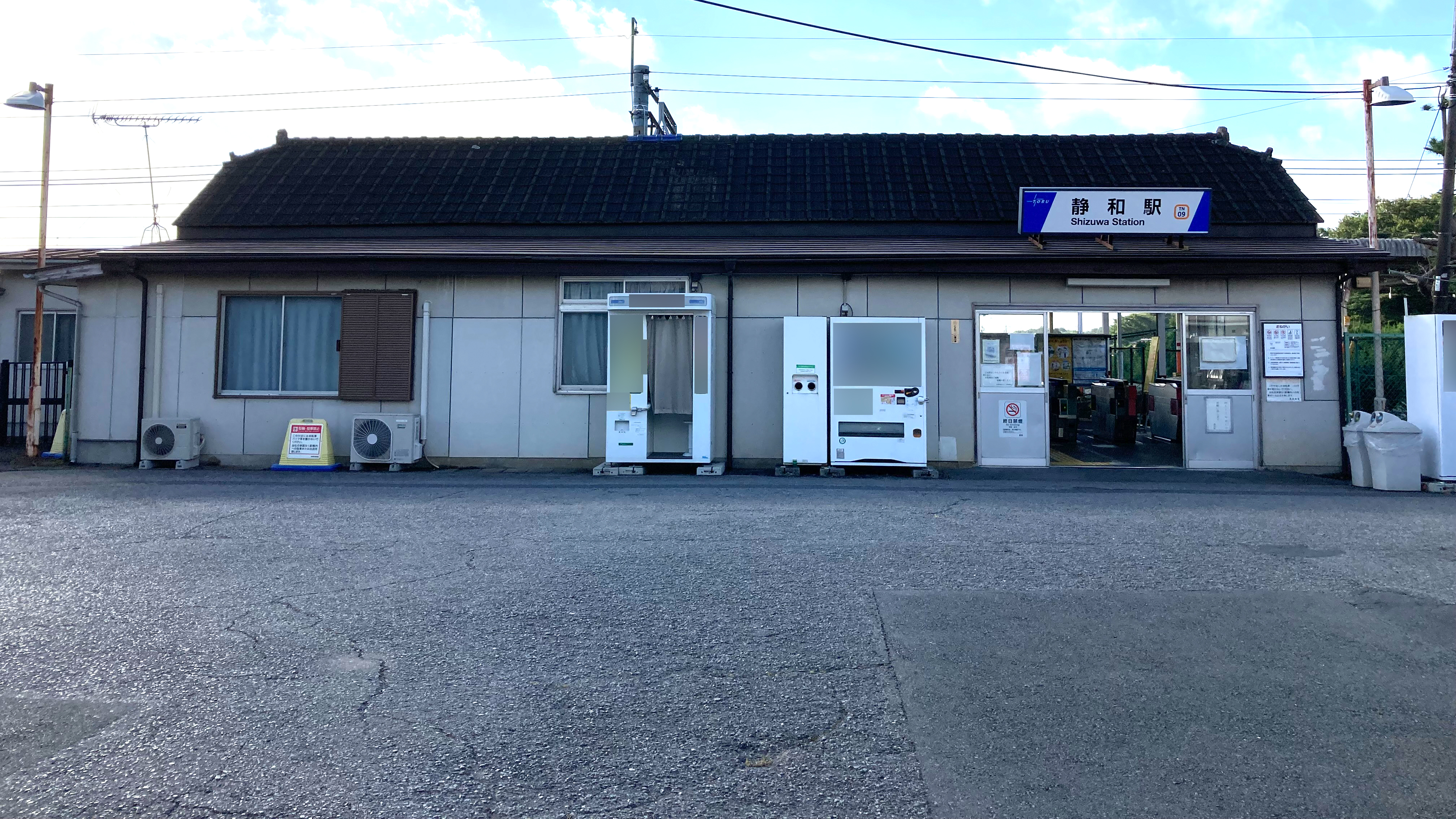
- Shizuwa Station in August 2021

General information
- Location: 2143 Shizuwa Iwafune-machi, Tochigi-shi, Tochigi-ken 329-4304; Japan
- Coordinates: 36.3163°N 139.6850°E
- Operator: Tobu Railway
- Line: Tobu Nikko Line
- Distance: 37.3 km from Tōbu-Dōbutsu-Kōen
- Platforms: 1 island platform

Other information
- Station code: TN-09
- Website: Official website

History
- Opened: 1 April 1929
- Former names: Tobu-Izumi (until 1929)

Passengers
- FY2020: 1196 daily

Services
Preceding station	Tobu Railway	Following station
Fujioka TN08 towards Tōbu-Dōbutsu-Kōen	Nikkō Line Local	Shin-Ōhirashita TN10 towards Tōbu–Nikkō
Location
- Location within Tochigi Prefecture Location within Japan

Shizuwa Station (静和駅, Shizuwa-eki) is a railway station in the city of Tochigi, Tochigi, Japan, operated by the private railway operator Tōbu Railway. The station is numbered "TN-09".

== Lines ==
Shizuwa Station is served by Tōbu Nikkō Line, and is 37.3 km from the starting point of the line at Tōbu-Dōbutsu-Kōen.

== Station layout ==
This station consists of a single island platform serving two tracks, connected to the station building by an underground passageway.

=== Platforms ===
1	■ Tōbu Nikkō Line	for Minami-Kurihashi and Tōbu-Dōbutsu-Kōen
2	■ Tōbu Nikkō Line	for Shin-Tochigi and Tōbu-Nikkō

== History ==
Shizuwa Station opened on 1 April 1929. The station was originally called Tobu-Izumi Station (東武和泉駅), but the name was changed to its present name on 1 July 1929.

From 17 March 2012, station numbering was introduced on all Tōbu lines, with Shizuwa Station becoming "TN-09".

== Passenger statistics ==
In fiscal 2019, the station was used by an average of 1196 passengers daily (boarding passengers only).

== Surrounding area ==
- Iwafune-Shizuwa Post Office

== See also ==
- List of railway stations in Japan
