= Kami-Imaichi Station =

Railway station in Nikkō, Tochigi Prefecture, Japan

TN24 Kami-Imaichi Station 上今市駅
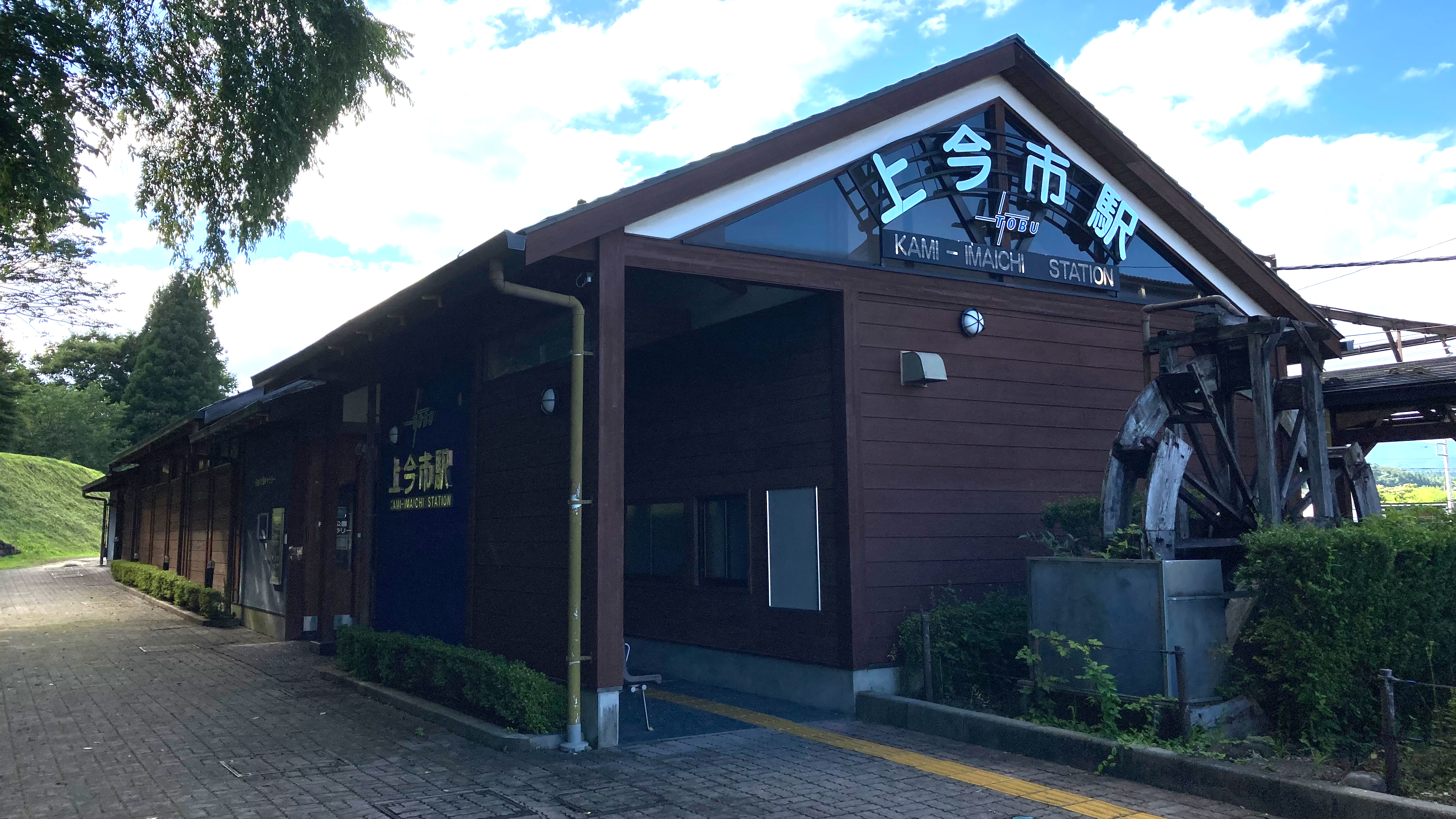
- The station building in August 2021

General information
- Location: 533-3 Imaichi, Nikkō-shi, Tochigi-ken 321-1261; Japan
- Coordinates: 36.7277°N 139.6809°E
- Operator: Tobu Railway
- Line: Tobu Nikko Line
- Distance: 88.4 km from Tōbu-Dōbutsu-Kōen
- Platforms: 2 side platforms

Other information
- Station code: TN-24
- Website: Official website

History
- Opened: 1 October 1929

Passengers
- FY2020: 103 daily

Services
Preceding station	Tobu Railway	Following station
Shimo-Imaichi TN23 towards Tōbu-Dōbutsu-Kōen	Nikkō Line Local	Tōbu–Nikkō TN25 Terminus
Location
- Location within Tochigi Prefecture Location within Japan

Kami-Imaichi Station (上今市駅, Kami-Imaichi-eki) is a railway station in the city of Nikkō, Tochigi, Japan, operated by the private railway operator Tobu Railway. The station is numbered "TN-24".

== Lines ==
Kami-Imaichi Station is served by the Tobu Nikko Line, and is 88.4 km from the starting point of the line at Tōbu-Dōbutsu-Kōen.

== Station layout ==
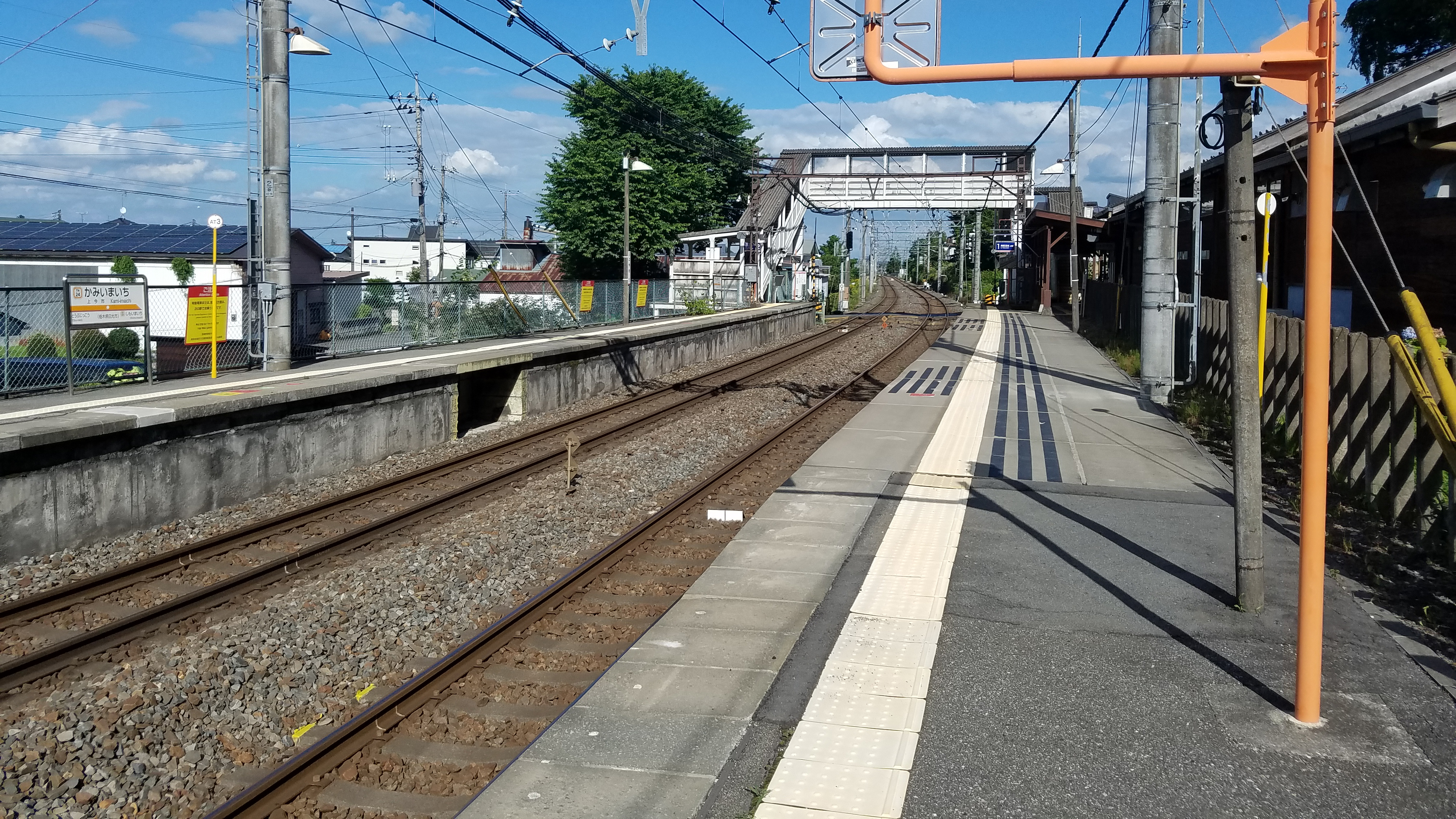
Kami-Imaichi Station platforms in August 2021

The station is unstaffed and consists of two opposed side platforms serving two tracks, connected to the station building by a footbridge.

=== Platforms ===
1	■ Tobu Nikko Line	for Tōbu-Nikkō
2	■ Tobu Nikko Line	for Shin-Tochigi, Minami-Kurihashi and Tōbu-Dōbutsu-Kōen

== History ==
Kami-Imaichi Station opened on 1 October 1929. It became unstaffed from 1 September 1973.

From 17 March 2012, station numbering was introduced on all Tobu lines, with Kami-Imaichi Station becoming "TN-24".

== Passenger statistics ==
In fiscal 2019, the station was used by an average of 103 passengers daily (boarding passengers only).

== Surrounding area ==
- Imaichi Cultural Center
- Imaichi Post Office

== See also ==
- List of railway stations in Japan
