= Kassemba Station =

Railway station in Tochigi, Tochigi Prefecture, Japan

TN13 Kassemba Station 合戦場駅
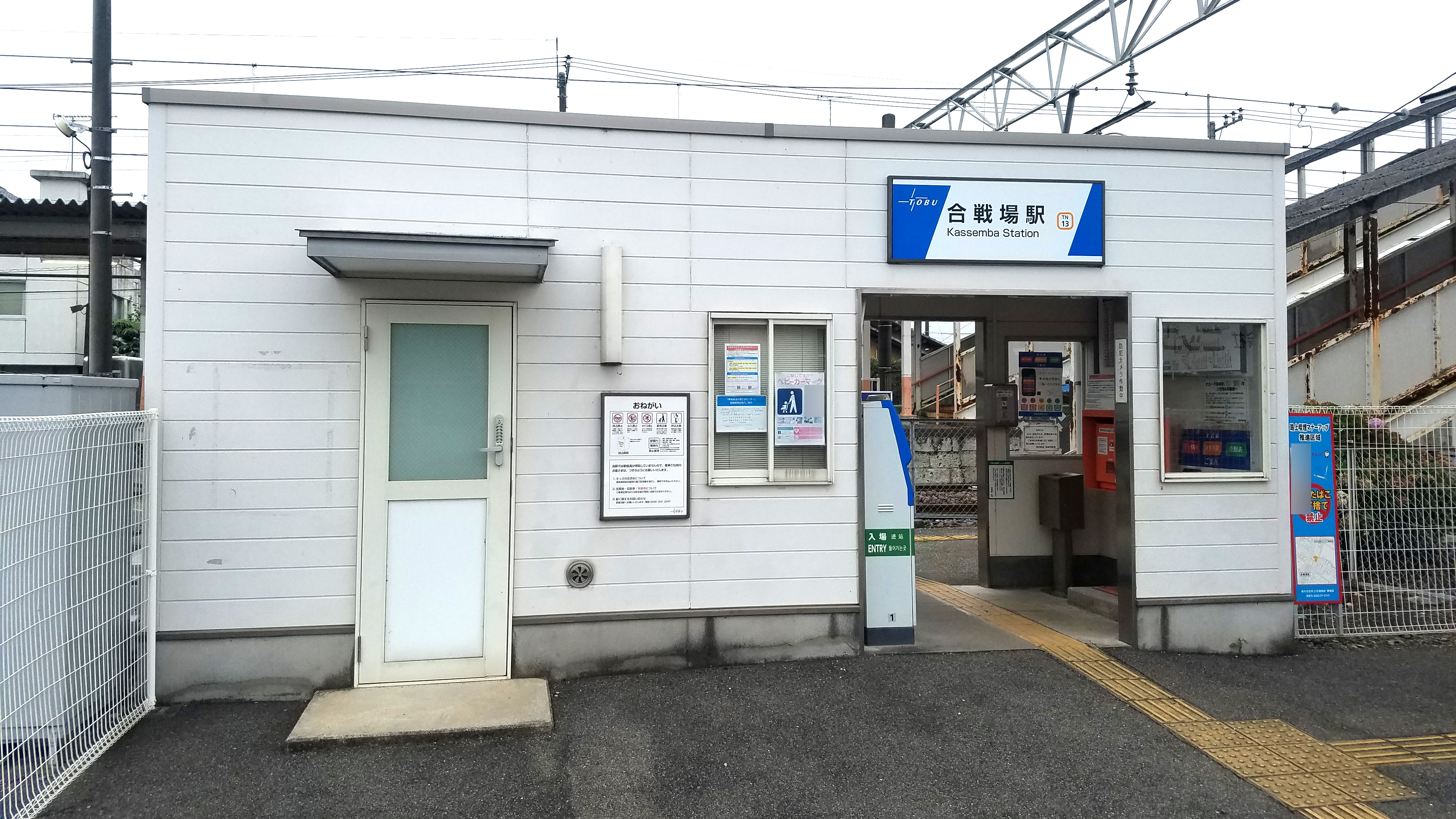
- Kassemba Station east exit in August 2021

General information
- Location: 513 Kassemba Tsuga-machi, Tochigi, Tochigi （栃木県栃木市都賀町合戦場513） Japan
- Coordinates: 36.4079°N 139.7412°E
- Operator: Tobu Railway
- Line: Tobu Nikko Line
- Distance: 50.0 km from Tōbu-Dōbutsu-Kōen
- Platforms: 2 side platforms

Other information
- Station code: TN-13
- Website: Official website

History
- Opened: 1 April 1929

Passengers
- FY2020: 347 daily

Services
Preceding station	Tobu Railway	Following station
Shin-Tochigi TN12 towards Tōbu-Dōbutsu-Kōen	Nikkō Line Local	Ienaka TN14 towards Tōbu–Nikkō
Location
- Location within Tochigi Prefecture Location within Japan

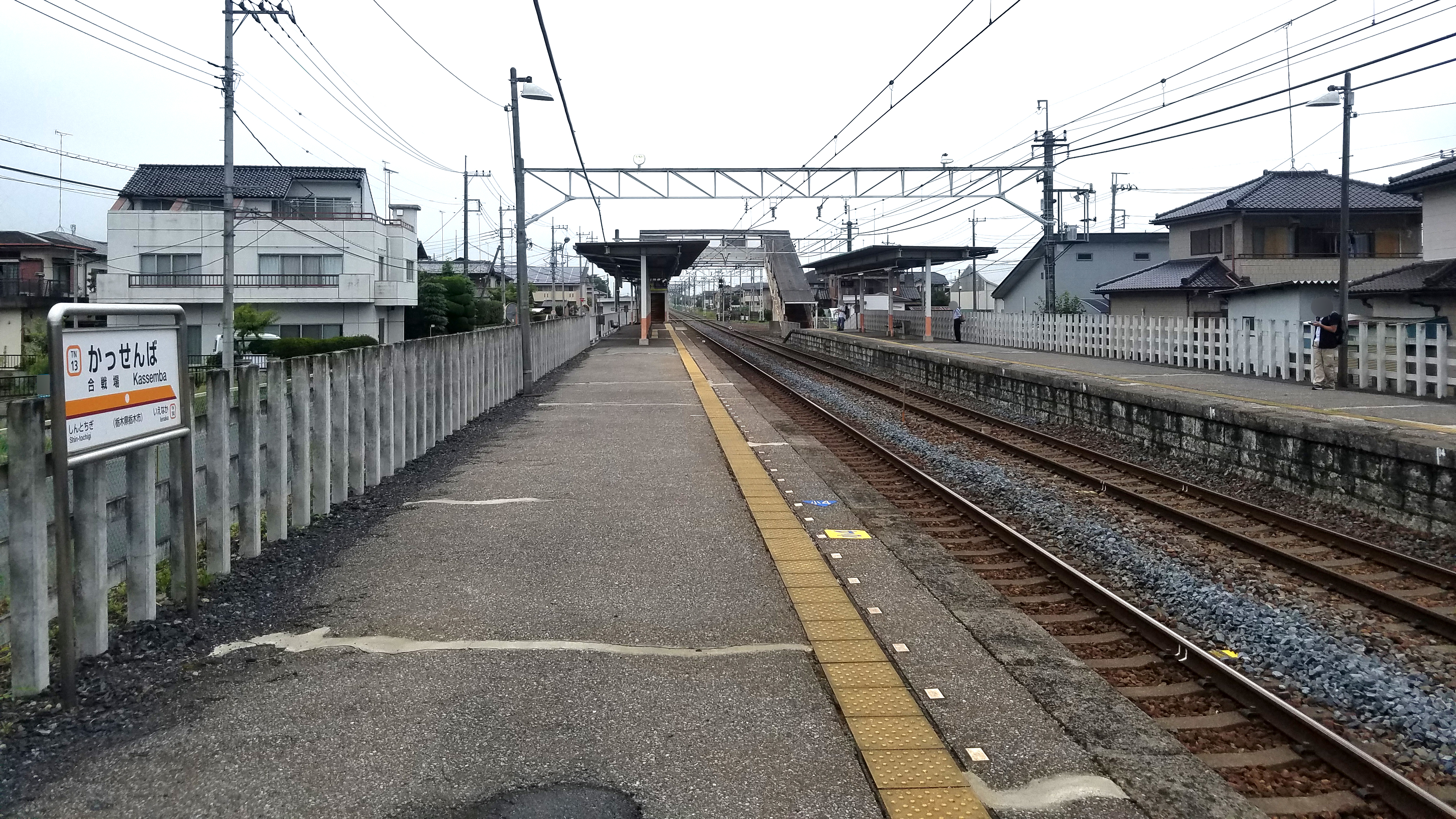
Kassemba station platforms in August 2021

Kassemba Station (合戦場駅, Kassemba-eki) is a railway station in the city of Tochigi, Tochigi, Japan, operated by the private railway operator Tobu Railway. The station is numbered "TN-13".

== Lines ==
Kassemba Station is served by the Tobu Nikko Line, and is 50.0 km (31 mi) from the starting point of the line at Tōbu-Dōbutsu-Kōen.

== Station layout ==
This station consists of two opposed side platforms serving two tracks, connected to the station building by a footbridge.

=== Platforms ===
1	■ Tobu Nikko Line	for Shin-Tochigi and Tōbu-Dōbutsu-Kōen
2	■ Tobu Nikko Line	for Tōbu-Nikkō

== History ==
Kassemba Station opened on 1 April 1929.

From 17 March 2012, station numbering was introduced on all Tobu lines, with Kassemba Station becoming "TN-13".

== Passenger statistics ==
In fiscal 2019, the station was used by an average of 347 passengers daily (boarding passengers only).

== Surrounding area ==
- Kassemba Post Office

== See also ==
- List of railway stations in Japan
