= Sugito-Takanodai Station =

Railway station in Sugito, Saitama Prefecture, Japan

TN01 Sugito-Takanodai Station 杉戸高野台駅
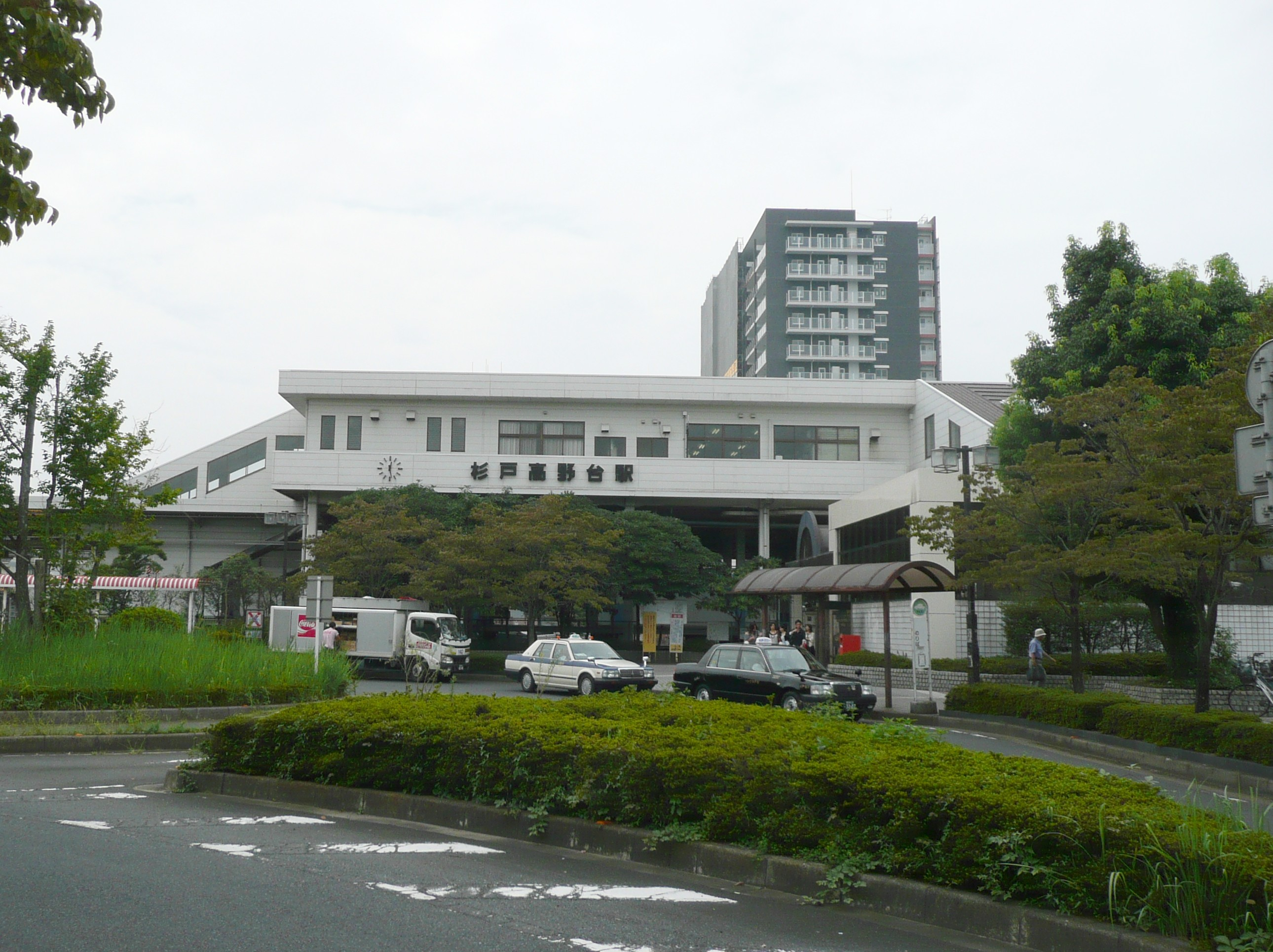
- Sugito-Takanodai Station, September 2008

General information
- Location: 1-19-8 Takanodai-higashi, Sugito-machi, Kitakatsushika-gun, Saitama-ken 345-0047; Japan
- Coordinates: 36.0518°N 139.7144°E
- Operator: Tōbu Railway
- Line: Tōbu Nikkō Line
- Distance: 3.2 km from Tōbu-Dōbutsu-Kōen
- Platforms: 2 island platforms

Other information
- Station code: TN-01
- Website: Official website

History
- Opened: 26 August 1986

Passengers
- FY2019: 11,512 daily

Services
| Preceding station | Tobu Railway | Following station |
|---|---|---|
| Kasukabe TS27 towards Asakusa | Kegon (limited service) | Minami-Kurihashi TN03 towards Tōbu–Nikkō |
| Tōbu-Dōbutsu-Kōen TS30 Terminus | Nikkō Line Express Section Express Semi Express Section Semi Express | Satte TN02 towards Minami-Kurihashi |
| Tōbu-Dōbutsu-Kōen TS30 Terminus | Nikkō Line Local | Satte TN02 towards Tōbu–Nikkō |
Location
- Location within Saitama Prefecture Location within Japan

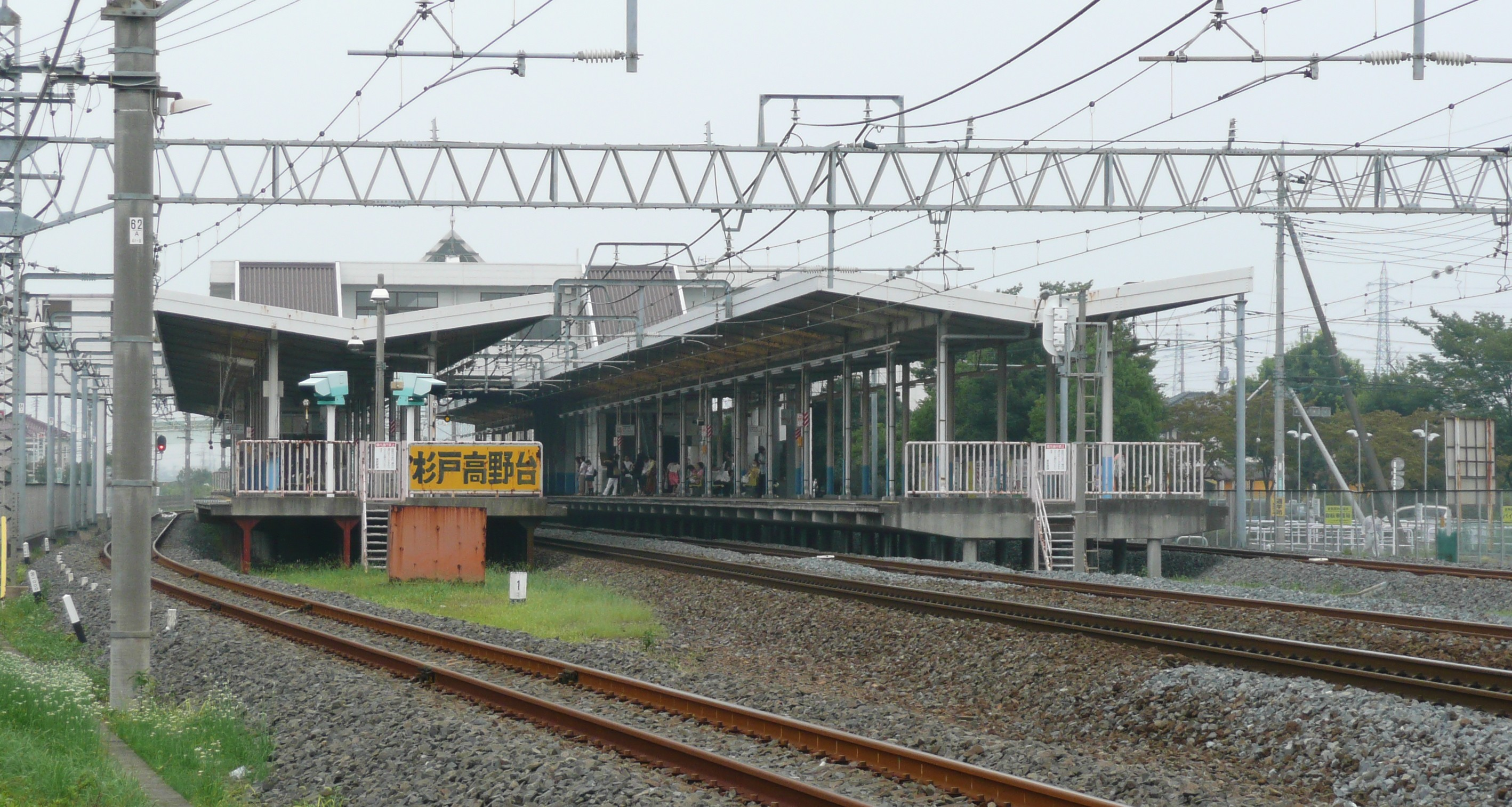
Station platforms

Sugito-Takanodai Station (杉戸高野台駅, Sugito-Takanodai-eki) is a passenger railway station located in the town of Sugito, Saitama, Japan, operated by the private railway operator Tōbu Railway.

== Lines ==
Sugito-Takanodai Station is served by the Tōbu Nikkō Line, and is 3.2 km from the starting point of the line at Tōbu-Dōbutsu-Kōen.

== Station layout ==
This station consists of two island platforms serving four tracks., with an elevated station building located above the tracks and platforms. Tracks 1 and 4 are on passing loops.

=== Platforms ===
| 1/2 | ■ Tōbu Nikkō Line | for Tōbu-Dōbutsu-Kōen; Tobu Skytree Line for Kasukabe, Kita-Senju, and Asakusa; Tokyo Metro Hibiya Line for Naka-Meguro; Tokyo Metro Hanzomon Line for Shibuya and Chūō-Rinkan |
| 3/4 | ■ Tōbu Nikkō Line | for Kurihashi, Tochigi, Shin-Tochigi, and Tōbu Nikkō |

== History ==
Sugito-Takanodai Station opened on 26 August 1986.

From 17 March 2012, station numbering was introduced on all Tōbu lines, with Sugito-Takanodai Station becoming "TN-01".

== Passenger statistics ==
In fiscal 2019, the station was used by an average of 11,512 passengers daily (boarding passengers only).

== Surrounding area ==
- Satte housing area
- National Route 4
- Sugito-Takanodai Post Office

== See also ==
- List of railway stations in Japan
