= Japan University of Health Sciences =

Private university in Saitama, Japan

Coordinates: 36°04′21.8″N 139°43′52.2″E

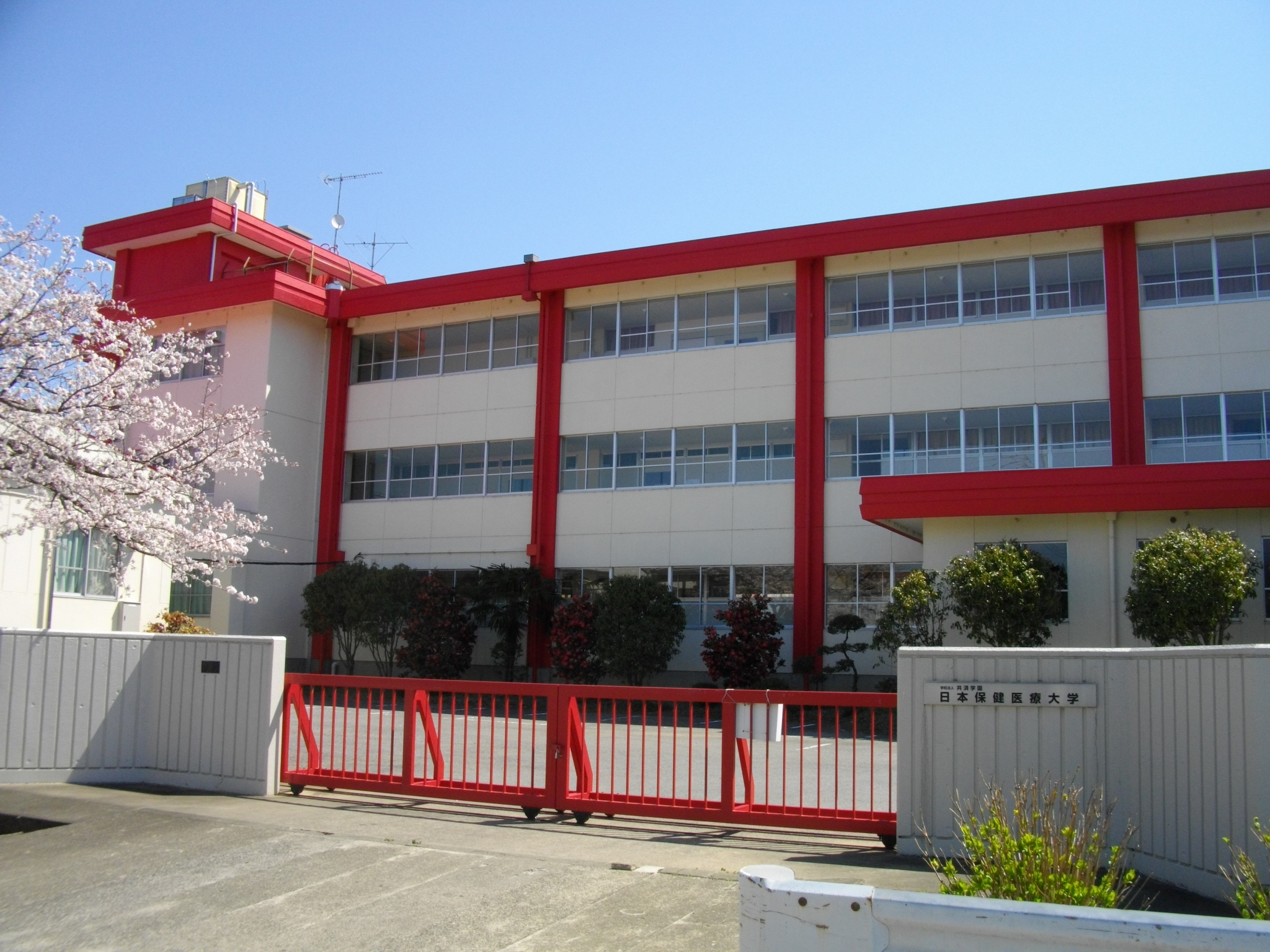
Japan University of Health Sciences

Japan University of Health Sciences (日本保健医療大学, Nihon hoken iryō daigaku) is a private university in Satte, Saitama, Japan, established in 2010.

The school has a Department of Nursing.
