= Satte =

Satte 幸手市
- City
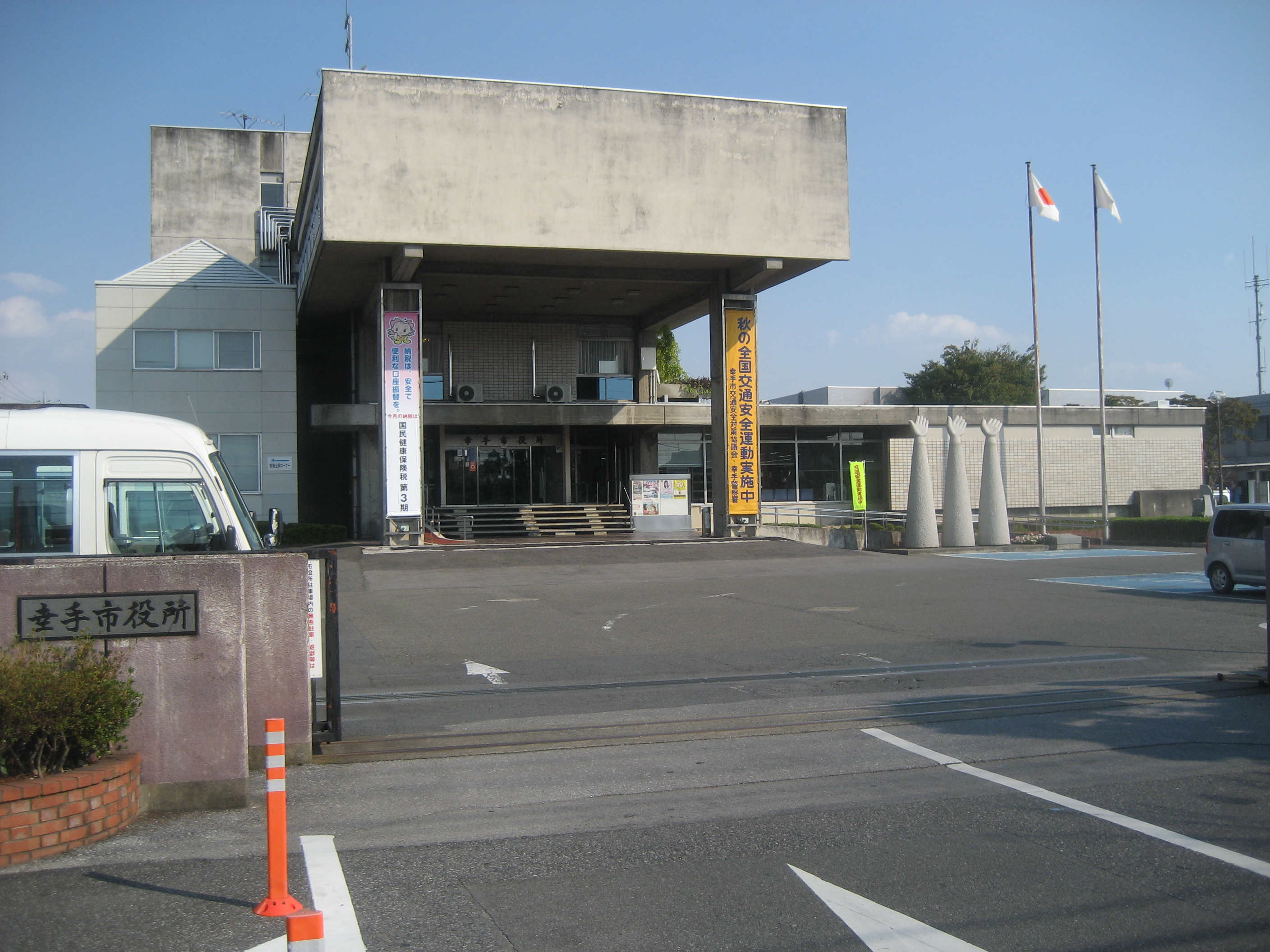
- Satte City Hall

- Flag Seal

- Location of Satte in Saitama Prefecture

- Location within Japan
- Coordinates: 36°4′41.1″N 139°43′33.1″E
- Country: Japan
- Region: Kantō
- Prefecture: Saitama

Area
  - Total: 33.93 km^{2} (13.10 sq mi)

Population (January 2021)
  - Total: 50,256
  - Density: 1,481/km^{2} (3,836/sq mi)
- Time zone: UTC+9 (Japan Standard Time)
- Tree: Podocarpus macrophyllus
- Flower: Sakura
- Phone number: 0480-43-1111
- Address: 4-6-8 Higashi, Satte-shi, Saitama-ken 340-0192
- Website: Official website

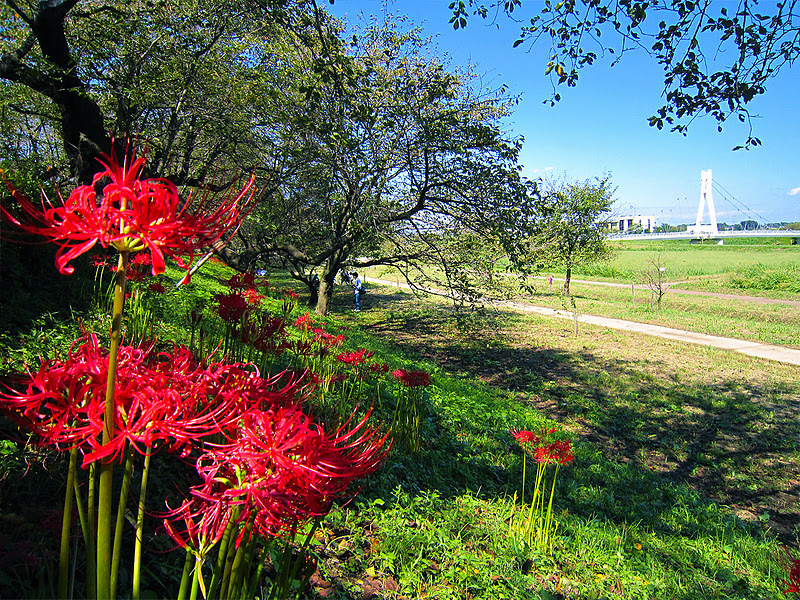
Gongendō Park

Satte (幸手市, Satte-shi) is a city located in Saitama Prefecture, Japan. As of 1 January 2021, the city had an estimated population of 50,256 in 22,853 households and a population density of 1,500 inhabitants per square kilometre (3,900/sq mi). The total area of the city is 33.93 square kilometres (13.10 sq mi).

== Geography ==
Located in the flatlands far eastern Saitama Prefecture, Satte is at the convergence of Saitama, Chiba and Ibaraki Prefectures, at an average altitude of approximately twenty metres (66 ft) above sea level. The Edo River and the Naka River flow through the city, which is approximately 50 km (31 mi) from downtown Tokyo.

=== Surrounding municipalities ===
Chiba Prefecture

- Noda

Ibaraki Prefecture

- Goka

Saitama Prefecture

- Kuki
- Sugito

=== Climate ===
Satte has a humid subtropical climate (Köppen Cfa) characterized by warm summers and cool winters with light to no snowfall. The average annual temperature in Satte is 14.6 °C (58.3 °F). The average annual rainfall is 1,336 mm (52.6 in) with September as the wettest month. The temperatures are highest on average in August, at around 26.6 °C (79.9 °F), and lowest in January, at around 3.5 °C (38.3 °F).

== Demographics ==
Per Japanese census data, the population of Satte peaked around the year 2000 and has declined since.

Historical population
Year	Pop.	±%
1950	24,574	—
1960	23,378	−4.9%
1970	27,923	+19.4%
1980	49,704	+78.0%
1990	54,342	+9.3%
2000	56,423	+3.8%
2010	54,012	−4.3%
2020	50,066	−7.3%

== History ==
During the Kamakura period, Satte developed as a post town on the Kamakura Kaidō, and maintained that role through the Edo period with the Nikkō Kaidō and the Nikkō Onari Kaidō.

The town of Satte was created within Kitakatsushika District, Saitama with the establishment of the modern municipalities system on April 1, 1889. It was raised to city status on October 1, 1986. Discussions to merge with neighboring Kuji and Washimiya in 2004 resulted in the selection of a new city name of Sakuranomiya (桜宮市), but the merger never took place.

== Government ==
Satte has a mayor-council form of government with a directly elected mayor and a unicameral city council of 15 members. Satte, together with the town of Sugito, contributes one member to the Saitama Prefectural Assembly. In terms of national politics, the city is part of Saitama 14th district of the lower house of the Diet of Japan.

== Economy ==
The economy of Satte is primarily agricultural.

== Education ==
- Japan University of Health Sciences
- Satte has nine public elementary schools and three public middle schools operated by the city government, and one public high school operated by the Saitama Prefectural Board of Education.

== Transportation ==
=== Railway ===
Tōbu Railway - Tobu Nikkō Line

  - Satte

=== Highway ===
- Ken-Ō Expressway
- National Route 4

== Local attractions ==
- Gongendo Tsutsumi (Japanese: 権現堂堤). About 1,000 Yoshino cherry trees are spread out over 1 km along the top of the levee of the Gongendo river. During cherry blossom season, many visitors from all over the prefecture and beyond come to enjoy the picturesque pink and yellow of cherry and rapeseed blossoms, and vendors set up stalls. The levee is also sown with hydrangea and red spider lilies, which bloom in the summer and fall.

== Notable people from Satte ==
- Kagami Yoshimizu, the creator of the Lucky Star series, was born in Satte. Although he has now moved out of Satte, his house was turned into the Lucky Star Museum, made to resemble Konata Izumi's (one of the main characters in the series) house for a few years. The museum is now closed.
