= Satte Station =

Railway station in Satte, Saitama Prefecture, Japan

TN02 Satte Station 幸手駅
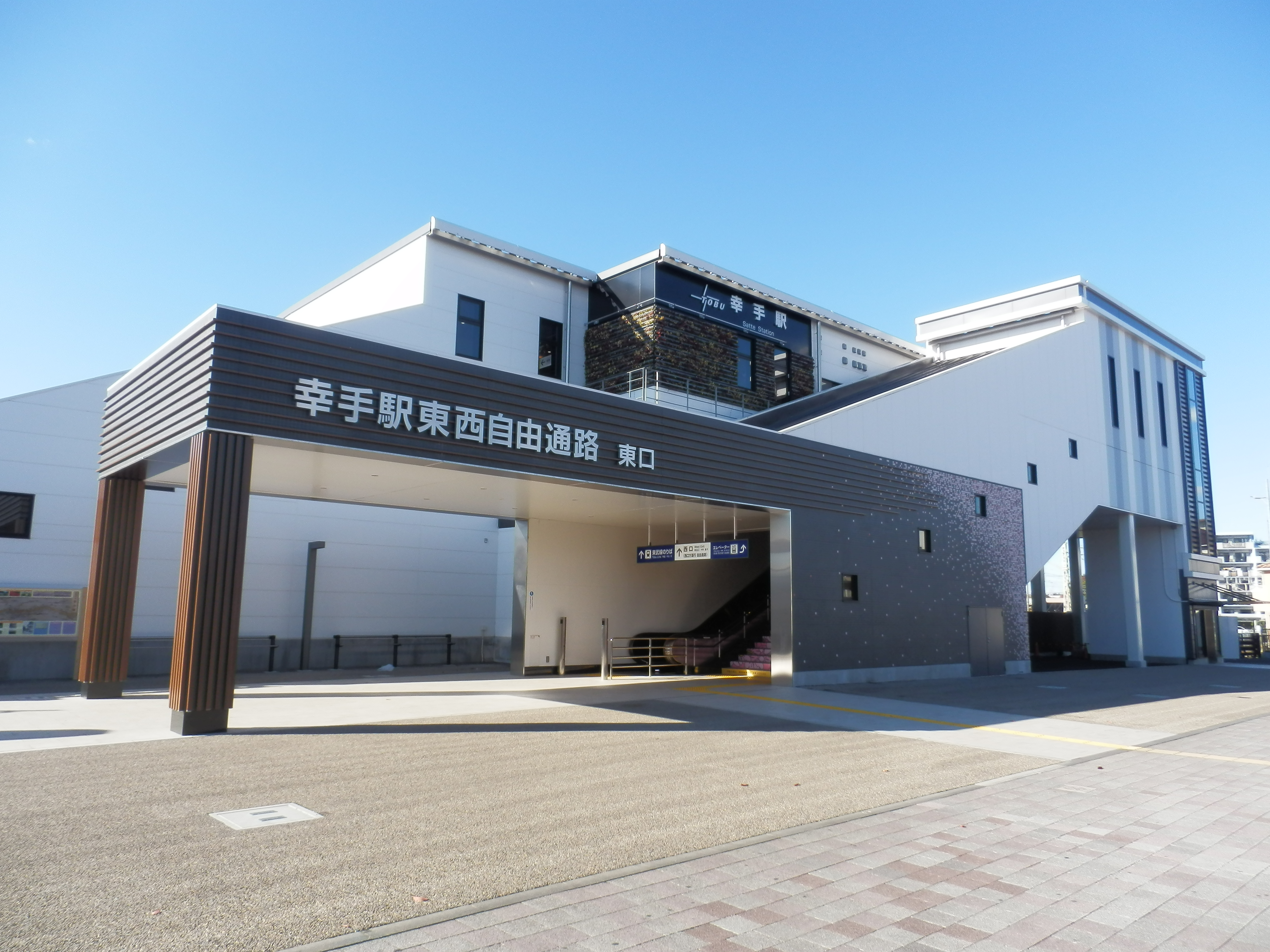
- Satte Station, 2019

General information
- Location: 1-1-23 Naka, Satte-shi, Saitama-ken 340-0156; Japan
- Coordinates: 36.0751°N 139.7143°E
- Operator: Tōbu Railway
- Line: Tōbu Nikkō Line
- Distance: 5.8 km from Tōbu-Dōbutsu-Kōen
- Platforms: 2 side platforms
- Tracks: 2

Construction
- Structure type: At grade

Other information
- Station code: TN-02
- Website: www.tobu.co.jp/station/info/3103.html

History
- Opened: 1 April 1929

Passengers
- FY2019: 13,574 daily

Services
Preceding station	Tobu Railway	Following station
Sugito-Takanodai TN01 towards Tōbu-Dōbutsu-Kōen	Nikkō Line Express Section Express Semi Express Section Semi Express	Minami-Kurihashi TN03 Terminus
Sugito-Takanodai TN01 towards Tōbu-Dōbutsu-Kōen	Nikkō Line Local	Minami-Kurihashi TN03 towards Tōbu–Nikkō
Location
- Location within Saitama Prefecture Location within Japan

Satte Station (幸手駅, Satte-eki) is a passenger railway station located in the city of Satte, Saitama, Japan, operated by the private railway operator Tōbu Railway.

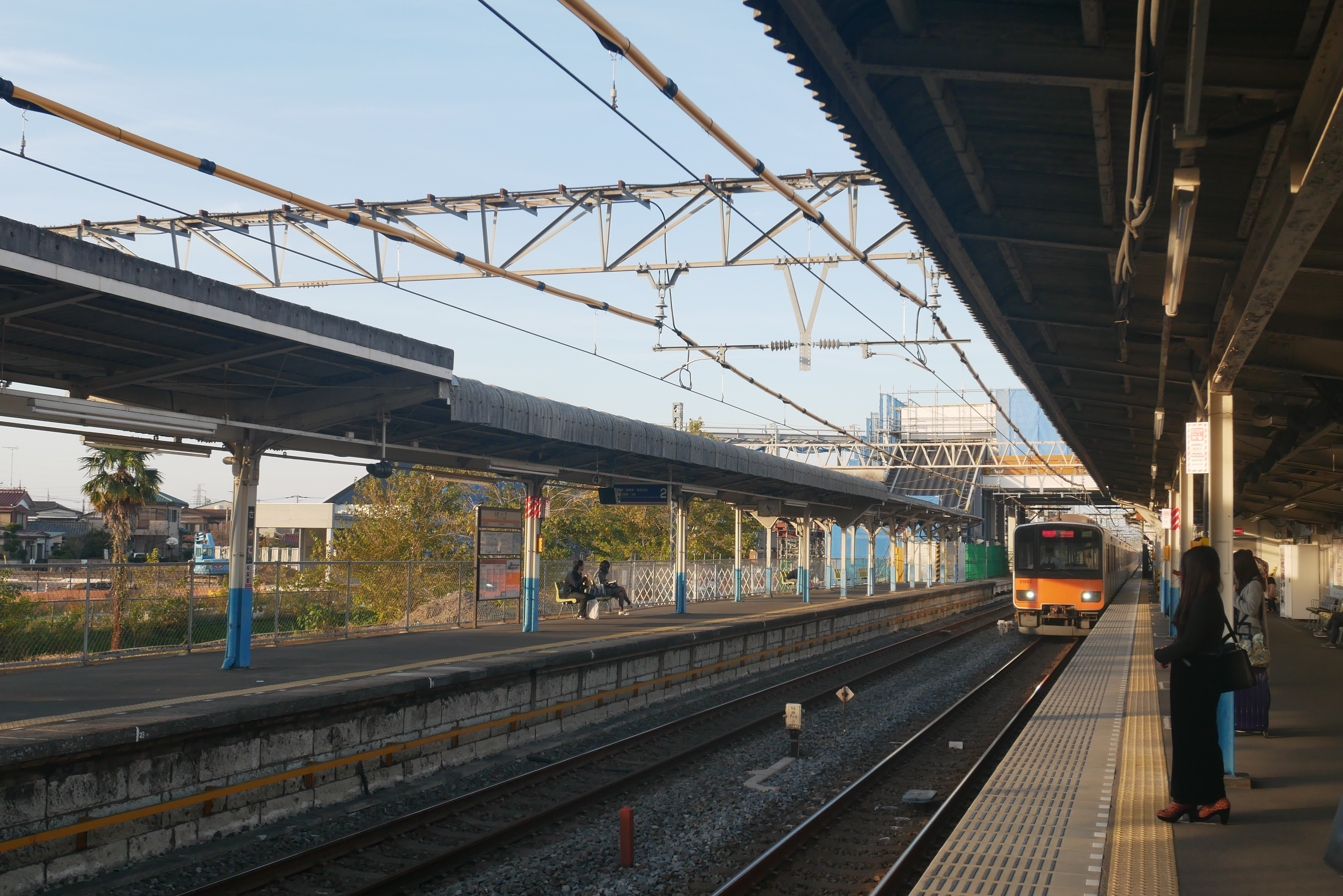
Station platforms, 2018

== Lines ==
Satte Station is served by the Tōbu Nikkō Line, and is 5.8 km from the starting point of the Nikko Line at Tōbu-Dōbutsu-Kōen. Express, Section Express, Semi Express, Section Semi Express, and Local all-stations services stop at this station.

== Station layout ==
This station consists of two opposed side platforms serving two tracks, connected to the station building by a footbridge.

=== Platforms ===
1	Tōbu Nikkō Line	for Tōbu-Dōbutsu-Kōen; Tobu Skytree Line for Kasukabe, Kita-Senju, and Asakusa; Tokyo Metro Hibiya Line for Naka-Meguro; Tokyo Metro Hanzōmon Line for Shibuya and Chūō-rinkan
2	Tobu Nikko Line	for Kurihashi, Tochigi, Shin-Tochigi, and Tōbu–Nikkō

== History ==
The station opened on 1 April 1929.

From 17 March 2012, station numbering was introduced on all Tōbu lines, with Satte Station becoming "TN-02".

== Passenger statistics ==
In fiscal 2019, the station was used by an average of 13,574 passengers daily.

== Surrounding area ==
- Satte Post Office
- National Route 4
- Sugito-Takanodai Post Office

== See also ==
- List of railway stations in Japan
