= Tōbu Nikkō Line =

Japanese railway line

Nikko Line

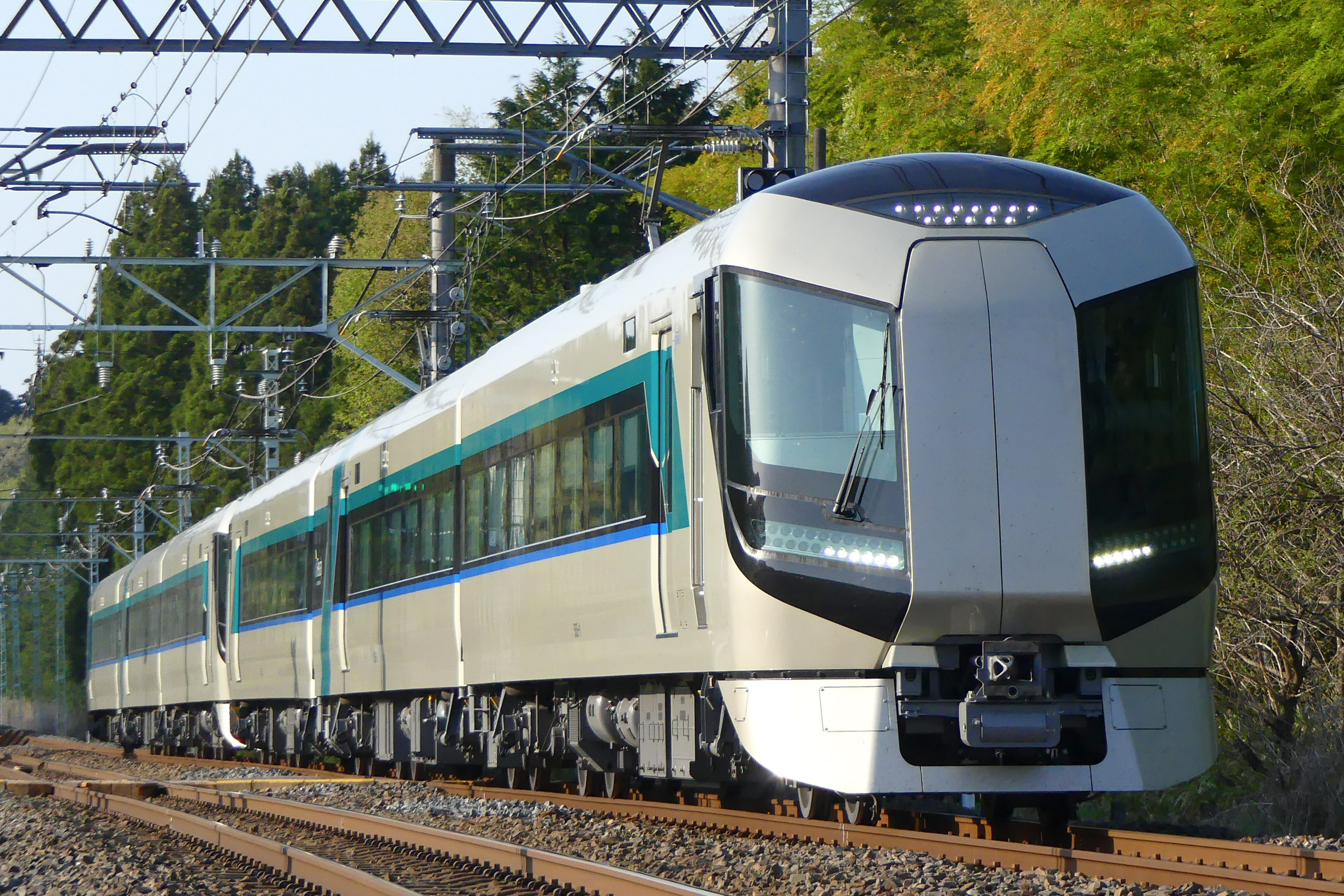
- A 500 series set "Revaty" on the Nikko Line in April 2017

Overview
- Native name: 日光線
- Status: In service
- Owner: Tobu Railway Co., Ltd.
- Locale: Kantō (Saitama, Gunma, and Tochigi)
- Termini: Tōbu-Dōbutsu-Kōen; Tōbu Nikkō
- Stations: 26

Service
- Type: Heavy rail
- System: Tobu Railway
- Route number: TN
- Operator(s): Tobu Railway Co., Ltd.
- Depot: Minami-Kurihashi

History
- Opened: 1 October 1929; 97 years ago

Technical
- Line length: 94.5 km (58.7 mi)
- Track gauge: 1,067 mm (3 ft 6 in)
- Electrification: 1,500 V DC, overhead catenary
- Operating speed: 120 km/h (75 mph)

The Nikko Line (日光線, Nikkō-sen) is a 94.5-kilometre (58.7 mi) railway line in Japan operated by the private railway company Tobu Railway. It branches from Tōbu Dōbutsu Kōen Station in Miyashiro, Saitama on the Skytree Line, extending north to Tōbu Nikkō Station in Nikkō, Tochigi.

The line has two branch lines: the Utsunomiya Line at Shin-Tochigi Station in Tochigi, Tochigi, and the Kinugawa Line at Shimo-Imaichi Station in Nikkō.

== Service patterns ==
As of March 2013, stops and service patterns are

- Local (普通, Futsū): Stops at all stations on the Nikko Line. Through to/from Naka-Meguro on the Tokyo Metro Hibiya Line;
- Section Semi-Express (区間準急, Kukan Junkyū): Stops at all stations on the Nikko Line, limited-stop service on the Skytree Line;
- Semi-Express (準急, Junkyū): Stops at all stations on the Nikko Line, limited-stop service on the Skytree Line. Through to/from Chūō-Rinkan on the Tokyu Den-en-toshi Line via the Tokyo Metro Hanzomon Line;
- Section Express (区間急行, Kukan Kyūkō): Stops at all stations on the Nikko Line, limited-stop service on the Skytree Line;
- Express (急行, Kyūkō): Stops at all stations on the Nikko Line, express service on the Skytree Line. Through to/from Chūō-Rinkan on the Tokyu Den-en-toshi Line via the Tokyo Metro Hanzomon Line.
- Limited Express (特急, Tokkyū): Stops at partly stations on the Nikko Line, Limited express also services on the Skytree Line. There are Limited Express which are 4 types of KN/KG (スペーシアきぬ・けごん, SPACIA KINU・KEGON)・RV (リバティきぬ・けごん・会津, REVATY KINU・KEGON・AIZU)・JR (日光・きぬがわ・スペーシアきぬがわ, JR NIKKO・KINUGAWA). Trains which are named KINU or KINUGAWA bound to Kinugawaonsen Station. Trains which are named KEGON or NIKKO bound to Tobu-Nikko Station. Trains which are named AIZU bound to Aizu-Tajima Station.
- SL Taiju Futara (SL大樹ふたら, Esueru Taiju Futara): Stops at Tobu-Nikko and Shimo-Imaichi. Passengers riding on this train must purchase the package on Tobu Top Tours and so on. Runs once a month.

== Stations ==
No.	Station	Japanese	Distance (in km)	Local	Section Semi-Express	Semi- Express	Section Express	Express	Limited Express	Transfer	Location	
					A	C	A	C	A/S			
TS30	Tōbu-Dōbutsu-Kōen	東武動物公園	0.0	O	O	O	O	O	｜	Tobu Skytree Line (TS30; through to/from Asakusa); Isesaki Line (TS30)	Miyashiro	Saitama
TN01	Sugito-Takanodai	杉戸高野台	3.2	O	O	O	O	O	KG/KN*4・RV*4		Sugito	Saitama
TN02	Satte	幸手	5.8	O	O	O	O	O	|		Satte	Saitama
TN03	Minami-Kurihashi	南栗橋	10.4	O *1	O	O	O	O *2/*3	KG/KN*4・RV*4		Kuki	Saitama
TN04	Kurihashi	栗橋	13.9	O				O	|	■ Utsunomiya Line	Kuki	Saitama
TN05	Shin-Koga	新古河	20.6	O				|	|		Kazo	Saitama
TN06	Yagyū	柳生	23.6	O				|	|		Kazo	Saitama
TN07	Itakura Tōyōdai-mae	板倉東洋大前	25.6	O				O	KG/KN*4・RV*4		Itakura	Gunma
TN08	Fujioka	藤岡	29.5	O				|	|		Tochigi	Tochigi
TN09	Shizuwa	静和	37.3	O				|	|		Tochigi	Tochigi
TN10	Shin-Ōhirashita	新大平下	40.1	O				O	|		Tochigi	Tochigi
TN11	Tochigi	栃木	44.9	O				O	KN/KG・RV・JR	■ Ryōmō Line	Tochigi	Tochigi
TN12	Shin-Tochigi	新栃木	47.9	O				O	KN/KG*4・RV*4	Utsunomiya Line (TN12)	Tochigi	Tochigi
TN13	Kassemba	合戦場	50.0	O				|	|		Tochigi	Tochigi
TN14	Ienaka	家中	52.4	O				|	|		Tochigi	Tochigi
TN15	Tōbu Kanasaki	東武金崎	56.6	O				|	|		Tochigi	Tochigi
TN16	Niregi	楡木	61.2	O				|	|		Kanuma	Tochigi
TN17	Momiyama	樅山	64.2	O				|	|		Kanuma	Tochigi
TN18	Shin-Kanuma	新鹿沼	66.8	O				O	KN/KG・RV・JR		Kanuma	Tochigi
TN19	Kita-Kanuma	北鹿沼	69.8	O				|	|		Kanuma	Tochigi
TN20	Itaga	板荷	74.9	O				|	|		Kanuma	Tochigi
TN21	Shimo-Goshiro	下小代	78.5	O				|	|		Nikkō	Tochigi
TN22	Myōjin	明神	81.3	O				|	|		Nikkō	Tochigi
TN23	Shimo-Imaichi	下今市	87.4	O				O	KN/KG・RV・JR	Kinugawa Line (TN23)	Nikkō	Tochigi
TN24	Kami-Imaichi	上今市	88.4	O				|	|		Nikkō	Tochigi
TN25	Tōbu-Nikkō	東武日光	94.5	O				O	KG・RV・JR	■ Nikkō Line (Nikkō)	Nikkō	Tochigi

Notes:

- O: Stop
- |: Non-stop
- 1: Terminating Services from Naka-Meguro on the Tokyo Metro Hibiya Line
- 2: Terminating Services from Chūō-Rinkan on the Tōkyū Den-en-toshi Line via Tokyo Metro Hanzōmon Line
- 3: Terminating Services from Tōbu Nikkō
- 4: Partly Services stop at the stations
- A: to/from Asakusa
- C: to/from Chūō-Rinkan
- S: to/from Shinjuku when named as JR

== History ==
The Nikko Line opened (dual track and electrified) on 1 October 1929.

In 1943, the section north of Kassemba was reduced to single track and the recovered rails were used to build the Tobu Kumagaya Line.

Electric limited express services first started operating in February 1949. From October 1960, new 1720 series "Deluxe Romance car" EMUs were introduced on limited express services to and from Nikko.

From 1 June 1990, new 100 series "Spacia" EMUs were introduced on limited express services, and the maximum speed of these was raised to 120 km/h in 1992.

A connecting track at Kurihashi was built to the JR-East Tōhoku Main Line (Utsunomiya Line) from 18 March 2006, allowing through-operations of Nikkō and Kinugawa limited express services to/from Ōmiya, Ikebukuro, and Shinjuku.

From 17 March 2012, station numbering was introduced on all Tobu lines, with Tobu Nikko Line stations adopting the prefix "TN" in orange.

The former Skytree Train and 300 series limited express trains, Rapid, and Section Rapid services were discontinued from the start of the revised timetable on 21 April 2017.

== Incidents ==
On 20 August 2026, four Tobu Railway workers were struck and killed by a limited express train outside of Shin-Kanuma Station as they were spraying herbicide to remove weeds from the tracks. Police began an investigation into whether relevant safety regulations were followed at the time of the accident.

== See also ==
- List of railway lines in Japan
