= Tōbu-Dōbutsu-Kōen Station =

Railway station in Miyashiro, Saitama Prefecture, Japan

TS30 Tōbu-dōbutsu-kōen Station 東武動物公園駅
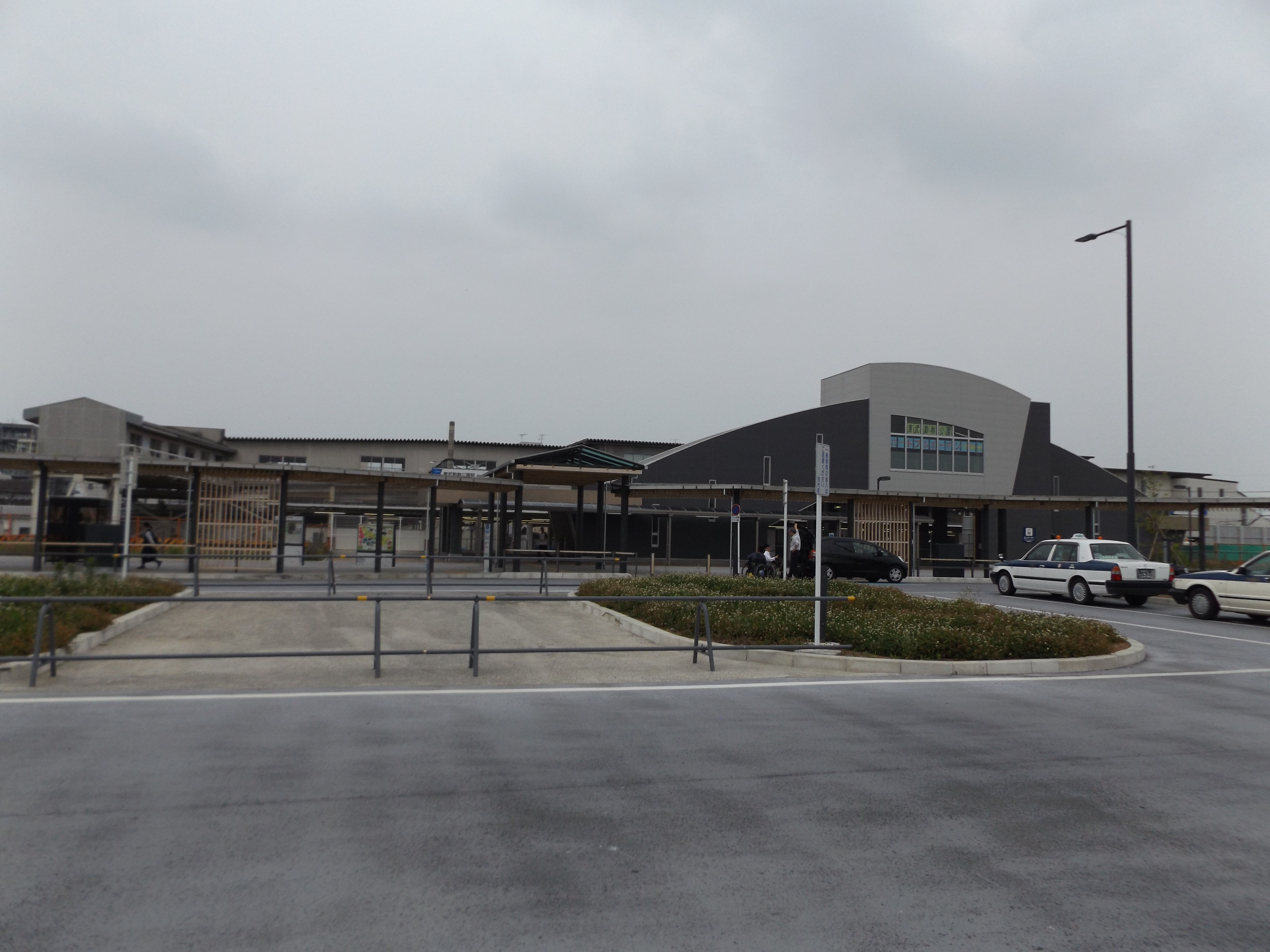
- Tōbu-dōbutsu-kōen west entrance in May 2016

General information
- Location: 2-3-24 Monma, Miyashiro Town, Minami-Saitama District, Saitama Prefecture 345-0801; Japan
- Coordinates: 36°1′29.5392″N 139°43′36.4152″E
- Operator: Tobu Railway
- Lines: Tobu Skytree Line; Tobu Nikko Line; Tobu Isesaki Line
- Distance: 41.0 km (25.5 mi) from Asakusa
- Platforms: 2 island platforms
- Tracks: 4

Other information
- Station code: TS-30
- Website: Official website

History
- Opened: 27 August 1899; 126 years ago
- Former names: Sugito (until 1981)

Passengers
- FY2024: 14,349 daily boardings
Services
Preceding station	Tobu Railway	Following station
Kita-Senju TS09 towards Asakusa	Ryomo	Kuki TI02 towards Kuzū, Akagi or Isesaki
Kasukabe TS27 towards Ebisu	TH Liner	Kuki TI02 Terminus
Kasukabe TS27 towards Oshiage	Tobu Skytree Line Express	through to Isesaki and Nikkō lines
Kasukabe TS27 towards Asakusa	Tobu Skytree Line Section Express	through to Isesaki and Nikkō lines
Himemiya TS29 towards Oshiage	Tobu Skytree Line Semi Express	through to Isesaki and Nikkō lines
Himemiya TS29 towards Asakusa	Tobu Skytree Line Section Semi Express Local	through to Isesaki and Nikkō lines
through to Tobu Skytree Line	Isesaki Line Express	Wado TI01 towards Kuki
through to Tobu Skytree Line	Isesaki Line Section Express	Wado TI01 towards Tatebayashi
through to Tobu Skytree Line	Isesaki Line Semi Express	Wado TI01 towards Kuki
through to Tobu Skytree Line	Isesaki Line Section Semi Express	Wado TI01 towards Tatebayashi
through to Tobu Skytree Line	Isesaki Line Local	Wado TI01 towards Isesaki
through to Tobu Skytree Line	Nikkō Line Express Section Express Semi Express Section Semi Express	Sugito-Takanodai TN01 towards Minami-Kurihashi
through to Tobu Skytree Line	Nikkō Line Local	Sugito-Takanodai TN01 towards Tōbu–Nikkō
Location
- Location within Saitama Prefecture Location within Kanto Area Location within Japan

Tōbu-dōbutsu-kōen Station (東武動物公園駅, Tōbu-Dōbutsu-Kōen-eki lit. '’Tōbu Zoological Park Station’') is a junction passenger railway station located in the town of Miyashiro, Saitama, Japan, operated by private railway operator Tōbu Railway (Tobu).

== Lines ==
The station is served by three lines: it is the terminus of the Tobu Skytree Line (41.0 km (25.5 mi) from the line's Tokyo starting point at Asakusa) and is the starting point of both the Tobu Isesaki Line and the Tōbu Nikkō Line.

== Surrounding area ==
- Tobu Zoo (which the station is named after) is a 10-minute walk or 5-minute bus ride from the station.
- Miyashiro Town Hall
- Sugito Post Office
- Nippon Institute of Technology

== Station layout ==
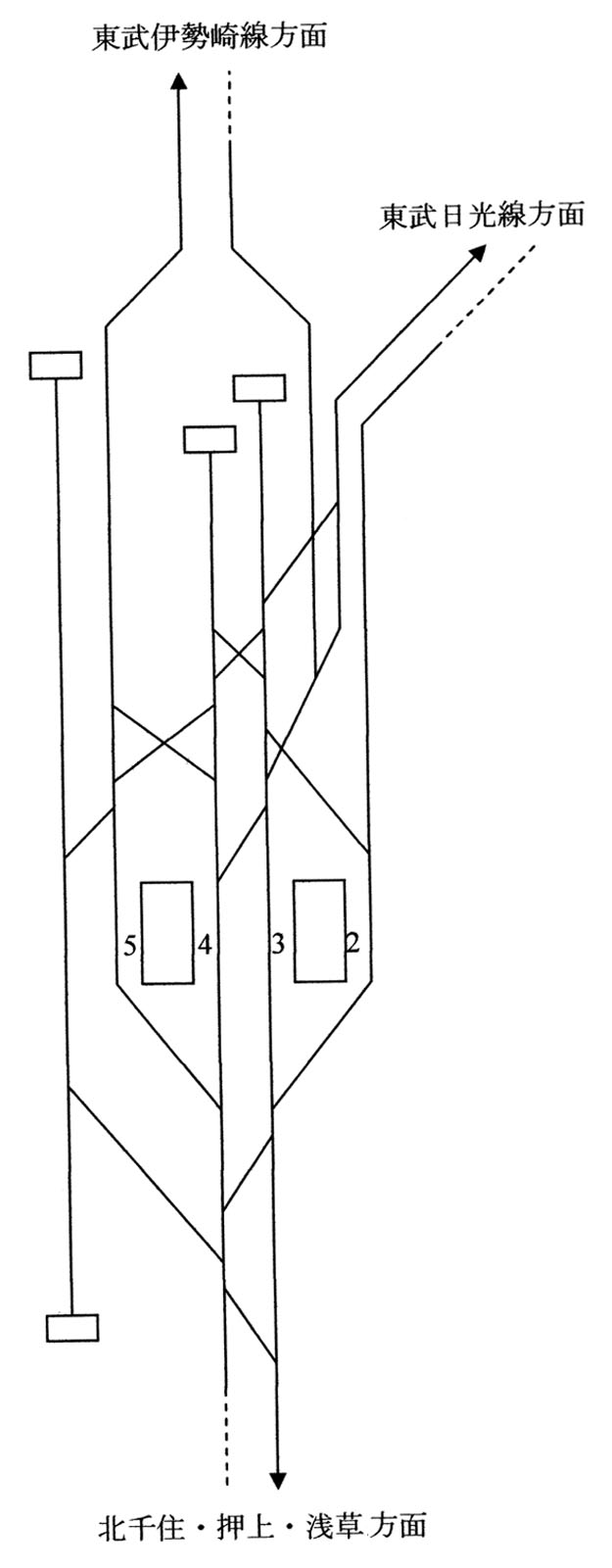
Tōbu-Dōbutsu-Kōen Station track layout

The station has two island platforms serving four tracks, with an elevated station building located above the tracks and platforms. Track 1 does not exist, and platform numbering starts from Platform 2.

=== Platforms ===
2	■ Tōbu Skytree Line	for Kasukabe, Kita-Senju, and Asakusa; Tokyo Metro Hibiya Line for Naka-Meguro; Tokyo Metro Hanzōmon Line for Shibuya and Chūō-Rinkan
3	■ Tōbu Skytree Line	for Kasukabe, Kita-Senju and Asakusa; Tokyo Metro Hibiya Line for Naka-Meguro; Tokyo Metro Hanzōmon Line for Shibuya and Chūō-Rinkan
4	■ Tōbu Nikkō Line	for Satte, Minami-Kurihashi, Kurihashi, Tochigi, Shin-Tochigi, and Tōbu Nikkō
5	■ Tōbu Isesaki Line	for Kuki, Tatebayashi, Ōta, and Isesaki

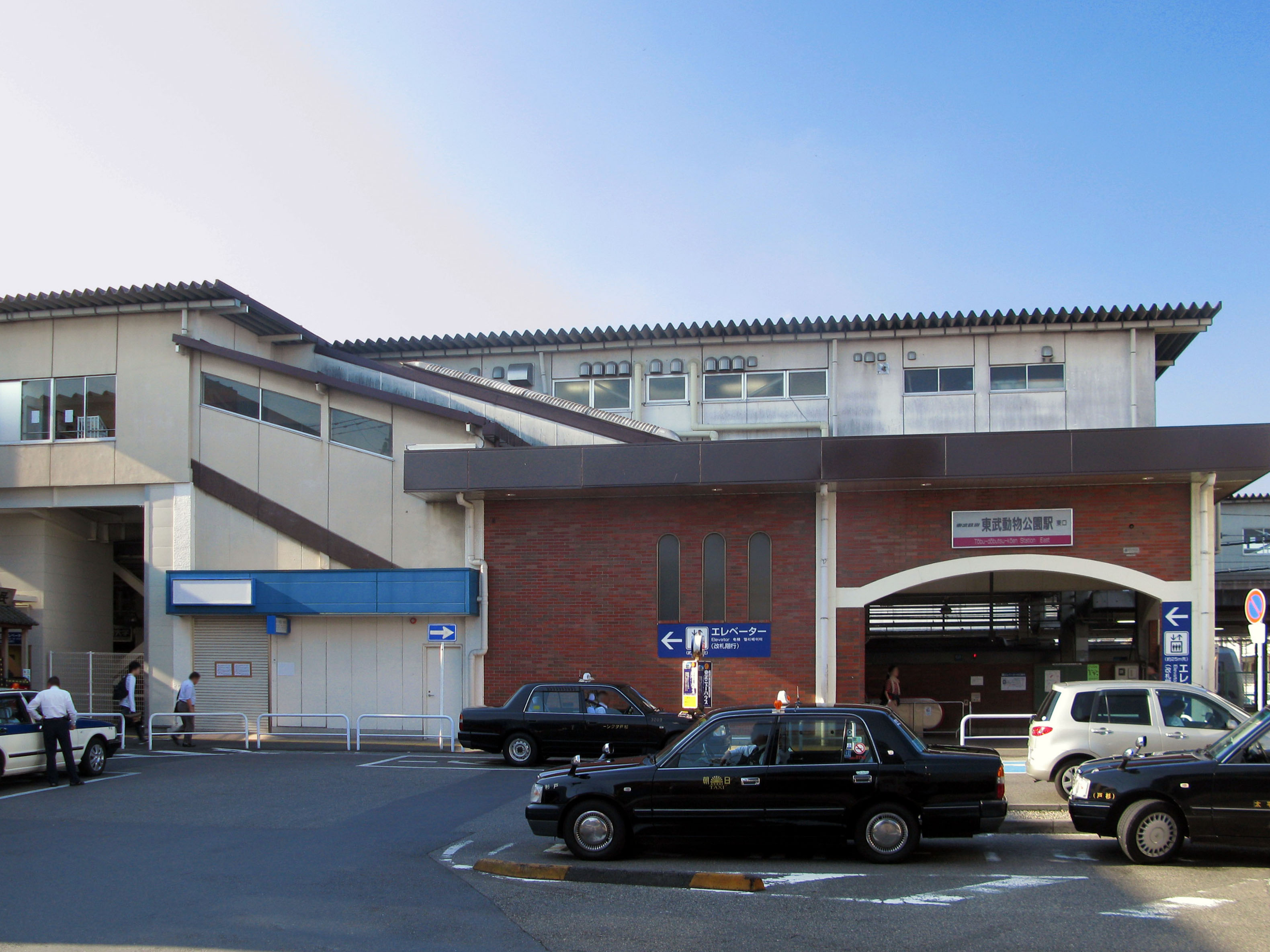
The east entrance in October 2012

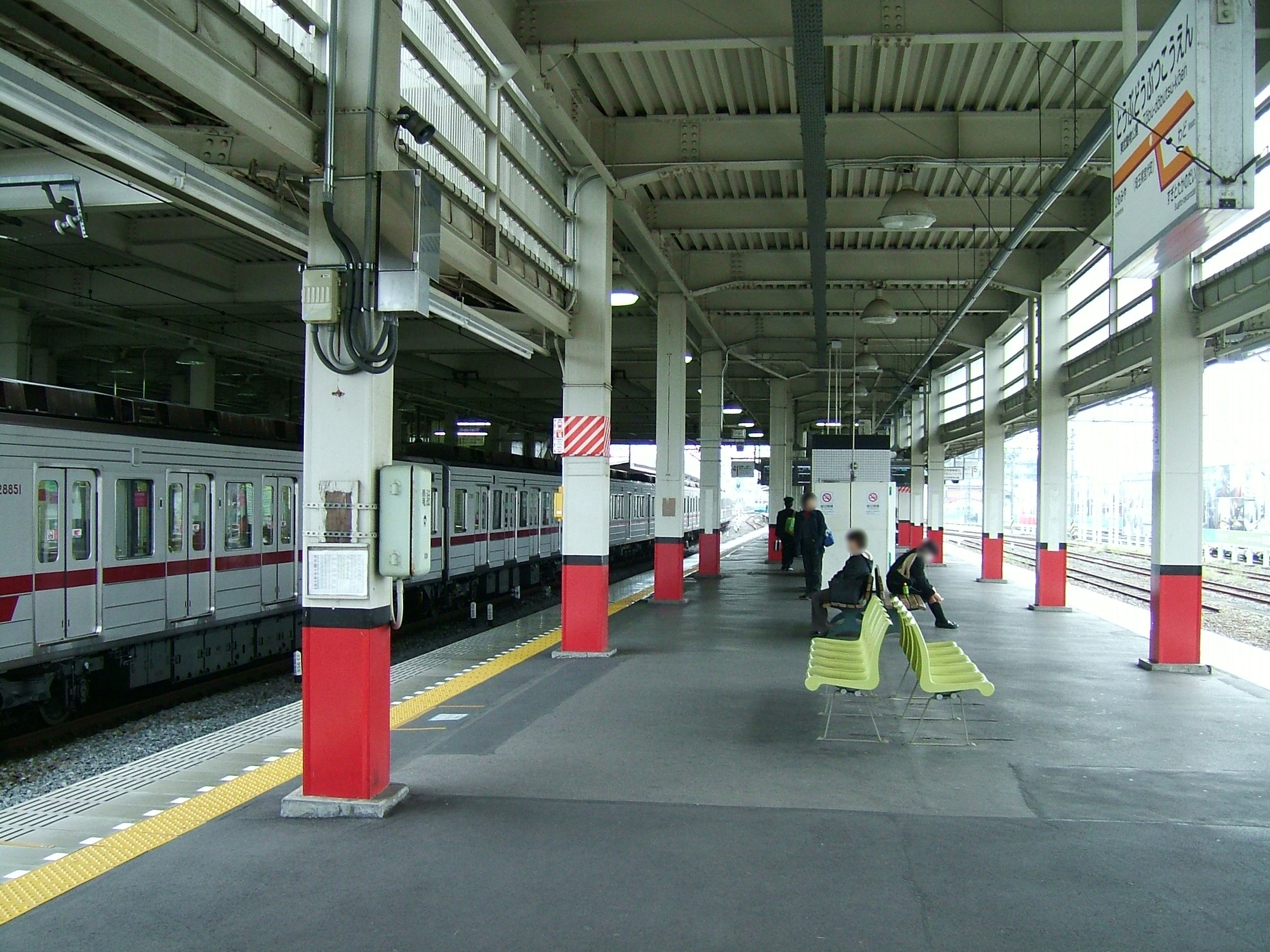
Platforms 4 and 5 in November 2008

== Passenger statistics ==
In fiscal 2024, the station was used by an average of 14,349 passengers daily (boarding passengers only).

== History ==
The station opened on 27 August 1899 as Sugito Station (杉戸駅). It was renamed Tōbu-Dōbutsu-Kōen Station on 16 March 1981 after Tobu Zoo, a nearby zoo and amusement park complex owned by Tōbu.

From 17 March 2012, station numbering was introduced on all Tōbu lines, with Tōbu-dōbutsu-kōen Station becoming "TS-30".

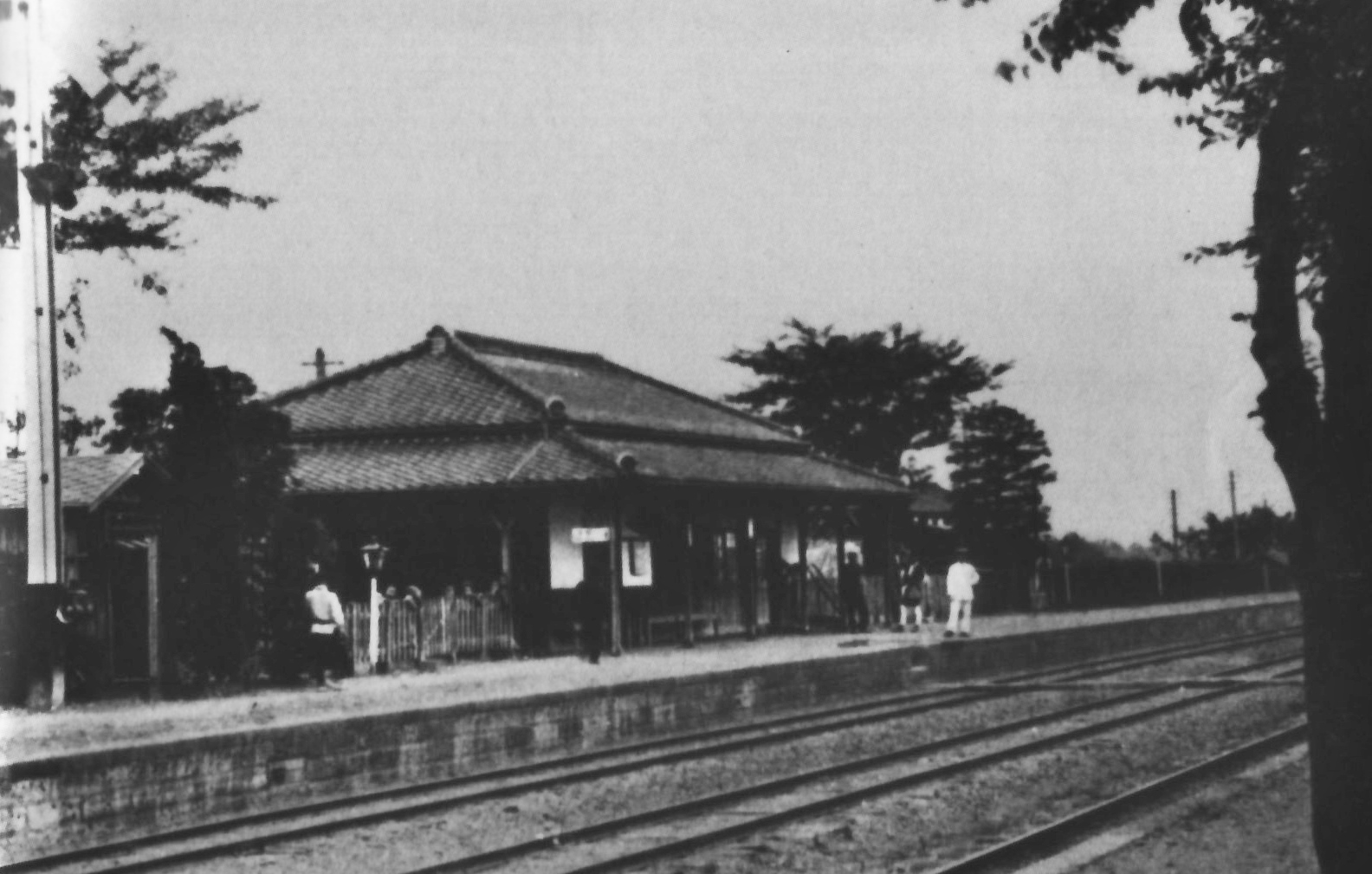
Sugito Station in the early 20th century

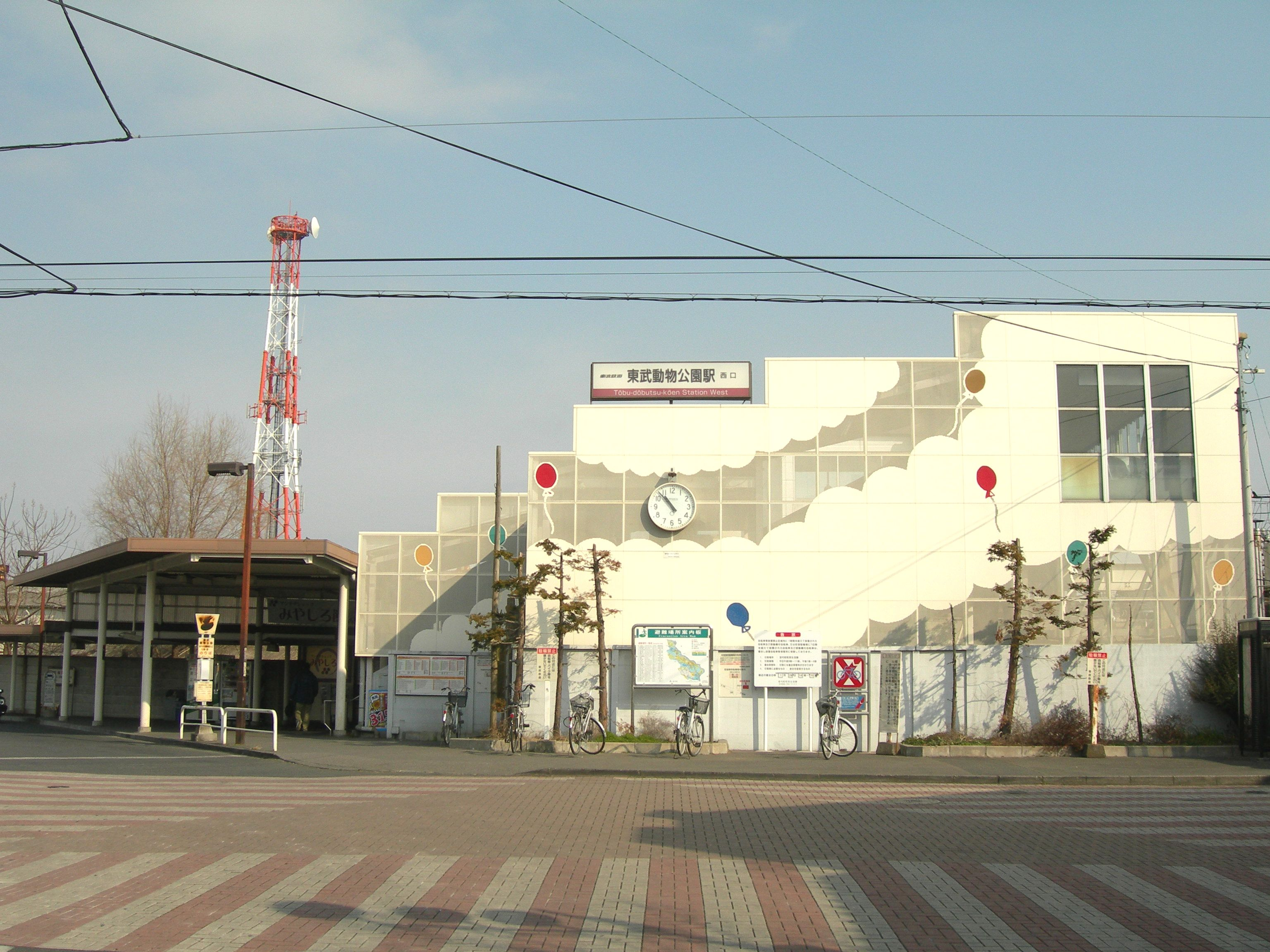
The west side of the station in January 2010, before rebuilding

== See also ==
- List of railway stations in Japan
