= Minami-Kurihashi Station =

Railway station in Kuki, Saitama Prefecture, Japan

TN03 Minami-Kurihashi Station 南栗橋駅
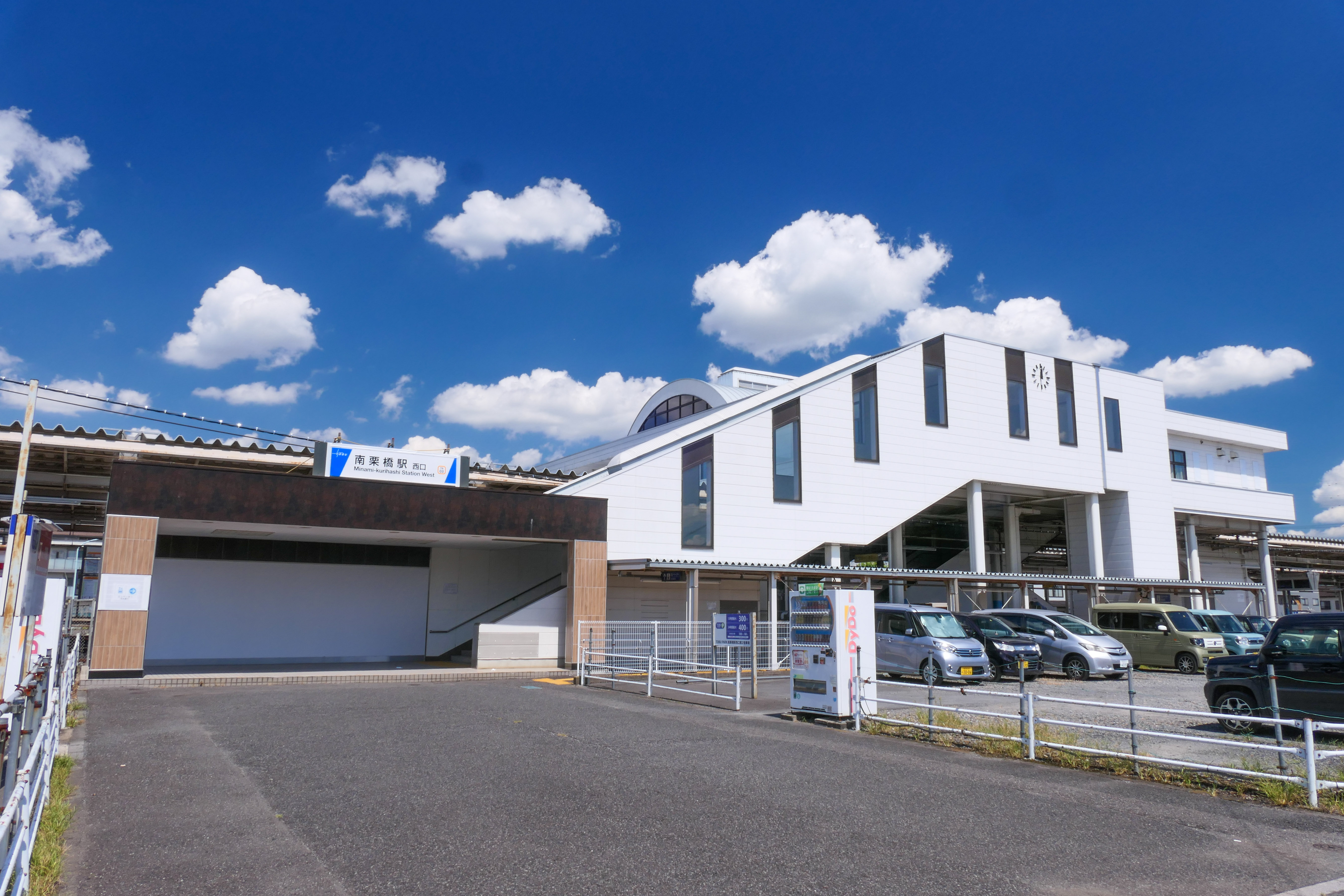
- The West entrance in July 2021

General information
- Location: 1-20 Minami-Kurihashi, Kuki-shi, Saitama-ken 349-1104; Japan
- Coordinates: 36.1132°N 139.7139°E
- Operator: Tōbu Railway
- Line: Tōbu Nikkō Line
- Distance: 10.4 km from Tōbu-Dōbutsu-Kōen
- Platforms: 2 island platforms
- Tracks: 4

Other information
- Station code: TN-03
- Website: Official website

History
- Opened: 26 August 1986

Passengers
- FY2019: 8,843 daily

Services
Preceding station	Tobu Railway	Following station
Sugito-Takanodai TN01 towards Asakusa	Kegon (limited service)	Tochigi TN11 towards Tōbu–Nikkō
Satte TN02 towards Tōbu-Dōbutsu-Kōen	Nikkō Line Express Section Express Semi Express Section Semi Express	Terminus
Terminus	Nikkō Line Express	Kurihashi TN04 towards Tōbu–Nikkō
Satte TN02 towards Tōbu-Dōbutsu-Kōen	Nikkō Line Local	Kurihashi TN04 towards Tōbu–Nikkō
Location
- Location within Saitama Prefecture Location within Japan

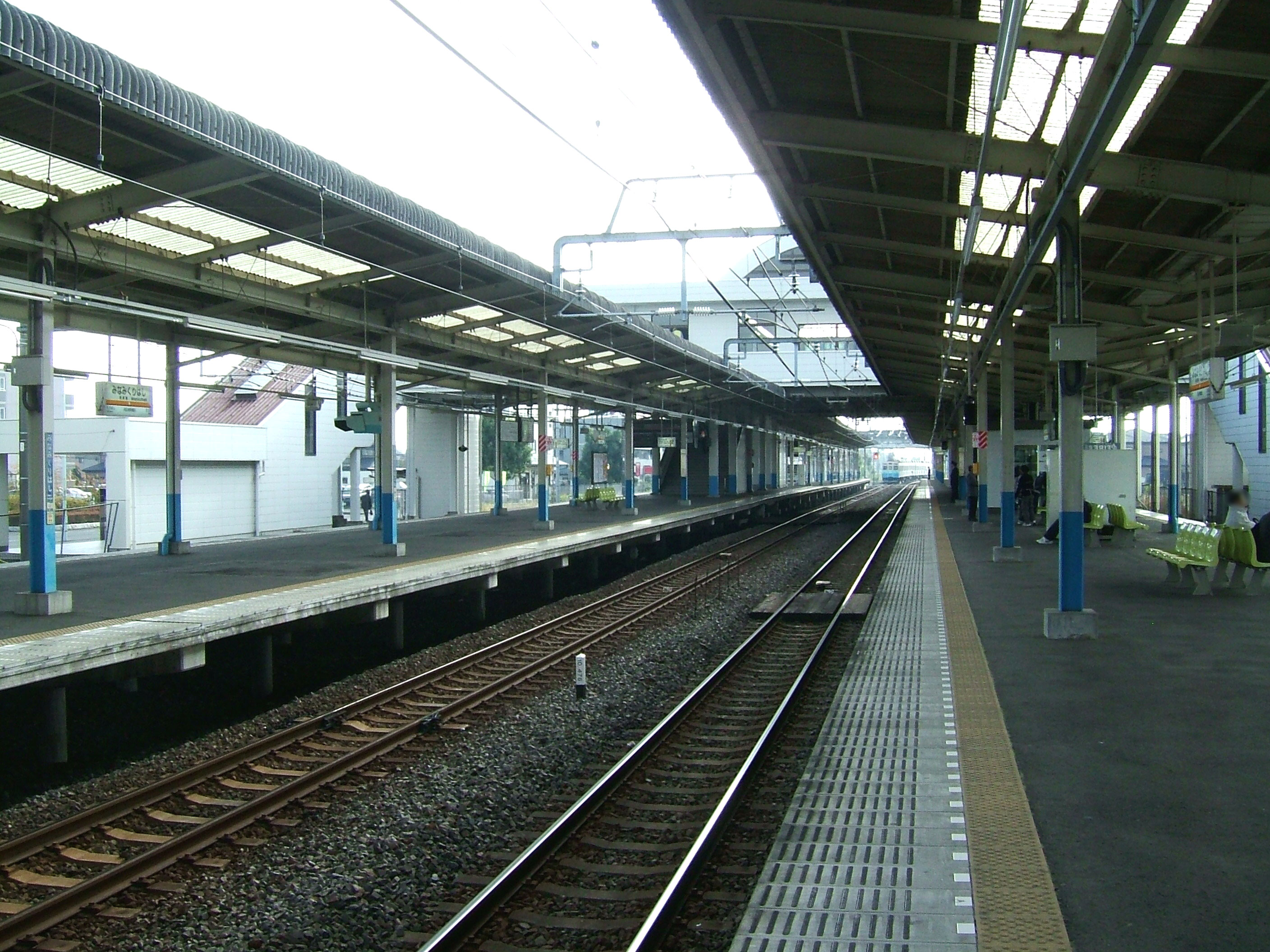
The station platforms in 2008

Minami-Kurihashi Station (南栗橋駅, Minami-kurihashi-eki) is a railway station located in the city of Kuki, Saitama, Japan, operated by the private railway operator Tōbu Railway. The station is numbered "TN-03".

== Lines ==
Minami-Kurihashi Station is served by the Tōbu Nikkō Line, and is 10.4 km from the starting point of the line at Tōbu-Dōbutsu-Kōen.

== Station layout ==
This station consists of two island platforms serving four tracks, with an elevated station building located above the tracks and platforms. Platforms 2 and 3 are on passing loops.

=== Platforms ===
1/2	Tōbu Nikkō Line	for Tōbu-Dōbutsu-Kōen; Tobu Skytree Line for Kasukabe, Kita-Senju, and Asakusa; Hibiya Line for Naka-meguro; Hanzōmon Line for Shibuya; Den-en-toshi Line for Chūō-rinkan
3/4	Tōbu Nikkō Line	for Kurihashi, Tochigi, Shin-Tochigi, and Tōbu–Nikkō

== History ==
Minami-Kurihashi Station opened on 26 August 1986.

From 17 March 2012, station numbering was introduced on all Tōbu lines, with Minami-Kurihashi Station becoming "TN-03".

== Passenger statistics ==
In fiscal 2019, the station was used by an average of 8843 passengers daily (boarding passengers only).

== Surrounding area ==
- National Route 4
- Minami-Kurihashi Post Office

== See also ==
- List of railway stations in Japan
