= Tōbu–Nikkō Station =

Railway station in Nikkō, Tochigi Prefecture, Japan

TN25 Tōbu-Nikkō Station 東武日光駅
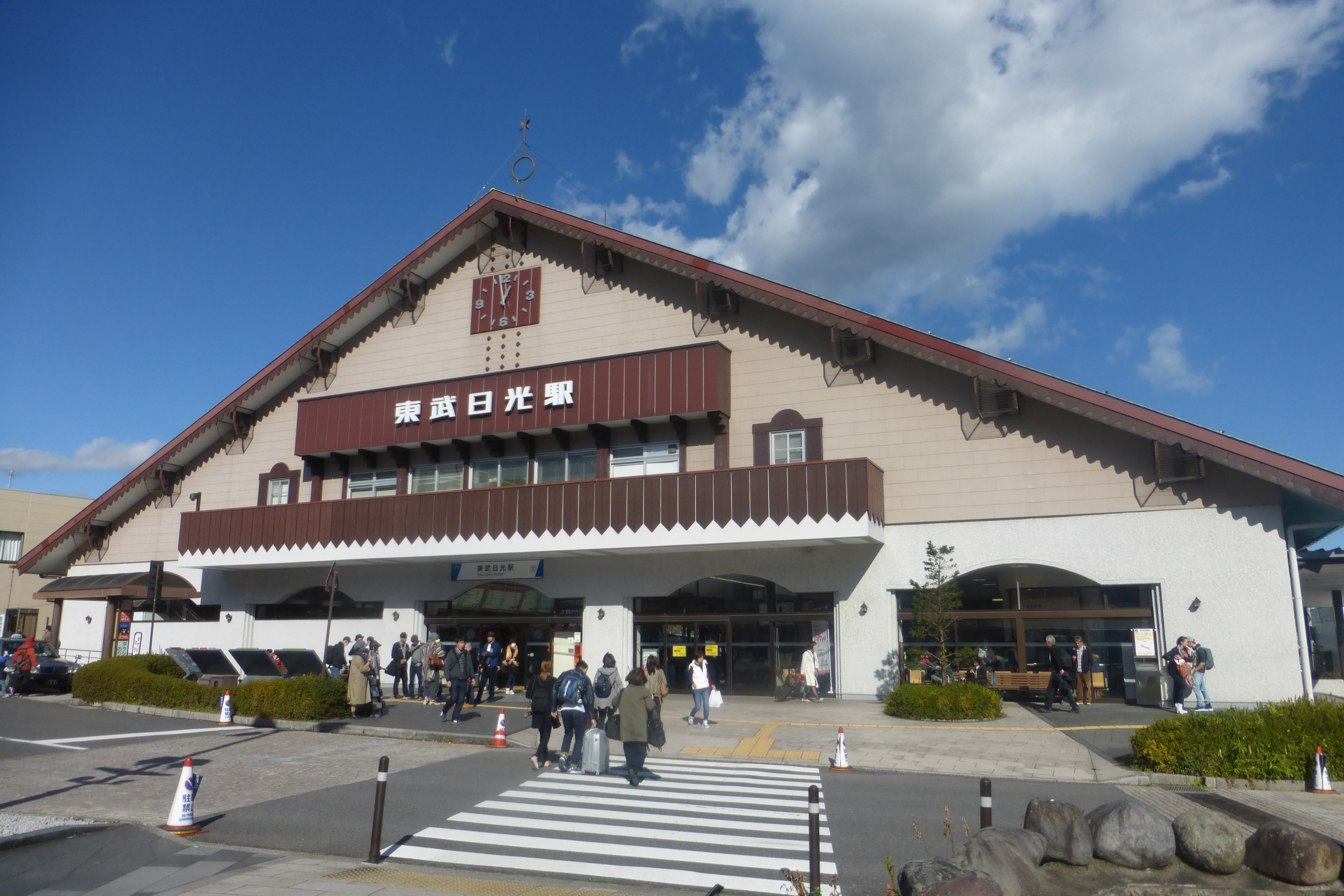
- Tōbu Nikkō Station in November 2016

General information
- Location: 4-3 Matsubara-chō, Nikkō-shi, Tochigi-ken; Japan
- Coordinates: 36.748056°N 139.62008°E
- Operator: Tobu Railway
- Line: Tobu Nikko Line
- Distance: 94.5 km from Tōbu-Dōbutsu-Kōen
- Platforms: 1 bay platforms

Other information
- Station code: TN-25
- Website: Official website

History
- Opened: 1 October 1929

Passengers
- FY2020: 3104 daily

Services
Preceding station	Tobu Railway	Following station
Shimo-Imaichi TN23 towards Shinjuku	Nikkō	Terminus
Shimo-Imaichi TN23 towards Asakusa	Spacia X	Terminus
Shimo-Imaichi TN23 towards Asakusa	Kegon	Terminus
Shimo-Imaichi TN23 Terminus	SL Taiju Futara	Terminus
Shimo-Imaichi TN23 towards Minami-Kurihashi	Nikkō Line Express	Terminus
Kami-Imaichi TN24 towards Tōbu-Dōbutsu-Kōen	Nikkō Line Local	Terminus
Location
- Location within Tochigi Prefecture Location within Japan

Tōbu-Nikkō Station (東武日光駅, Tōbu-Nikkō-eki) is a railway station in the city of Nikkō, Tochigi, Japan, operated by the private railway operator Tobu Railway. The station is numbered "TN-25".

== Lines ==
Tōbu-Nikkō Station is the terminus of the Tōbu Nikkō Line, and is located 94.5 km from the starting point of the line at Tōbu-Dōbutsu-Kōen Station. The station is served by all-stations "Local" services from Shin-Tochigi, as well as direct Limited express Spacia and limited-stop "Rapid" and "Section Rapid" services from the Asakusa terminal in Tokyo.

== Station layout ==
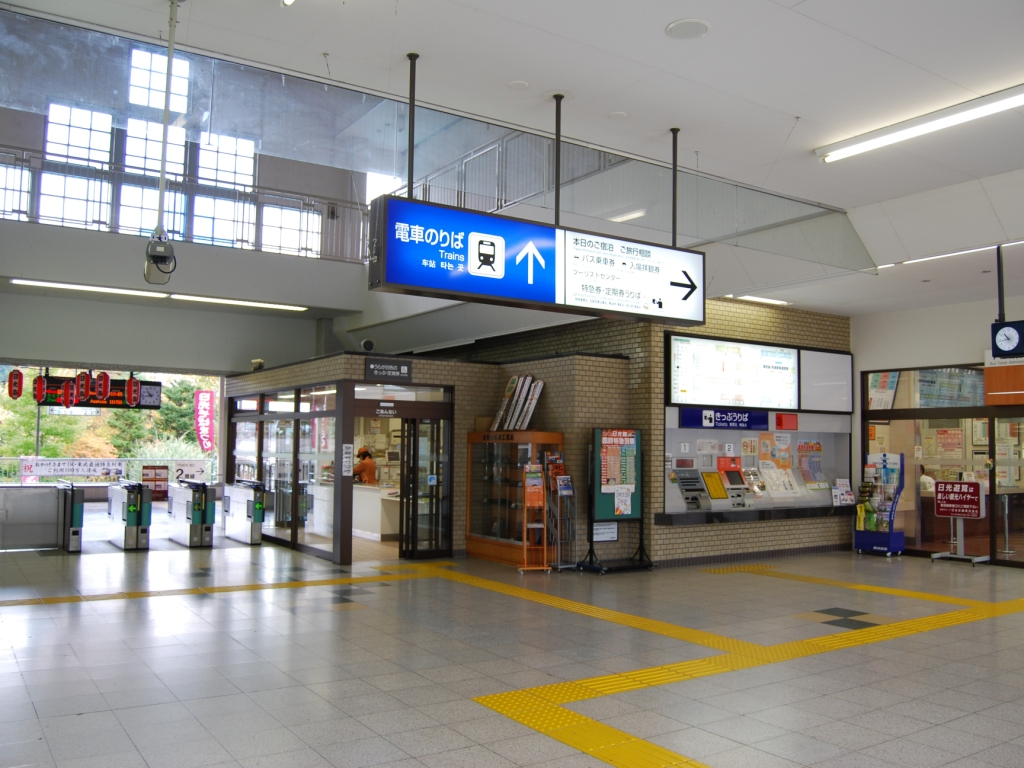
Tōbu-Nikkō Station concourse and ticket barriers in October 2008

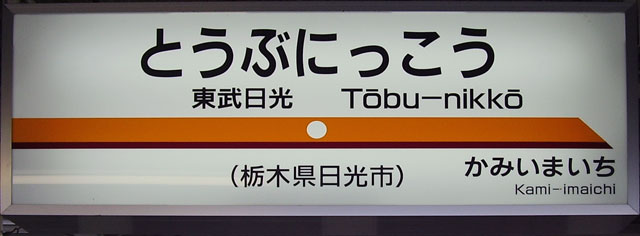
Sign on the platform

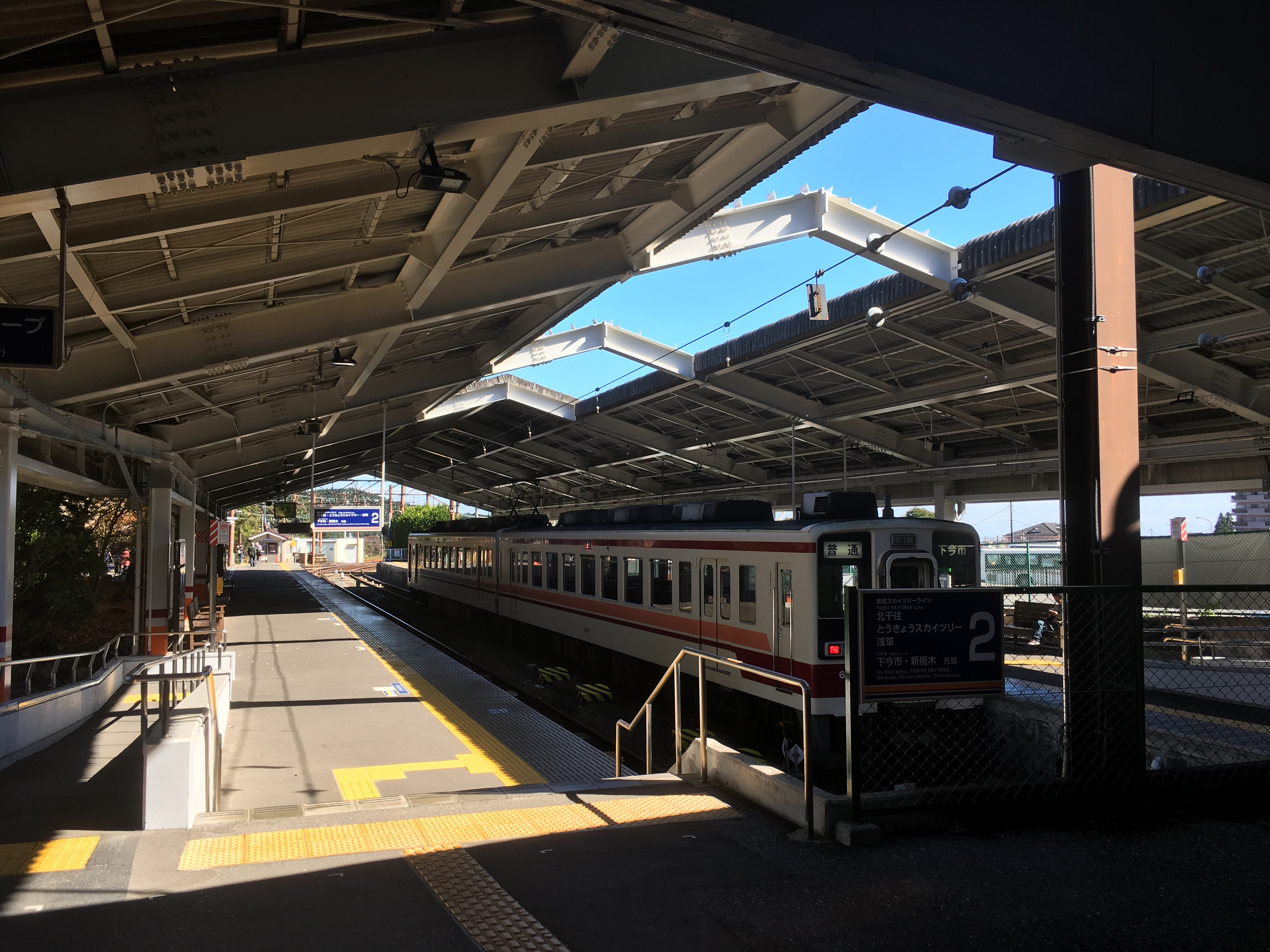
The station platforms, 2021

The station has five terminating platforms, numbered 1 to 2 and 4 to 6.

== History ==
Tōbu-Nikkō Station opened on 1 October 1929. The current station building was completed in October 1997.

From 17 March 2012, station numbering was introduced on Tobu lines, with Tōbu-Nikkō Station becoming "TN-25".

== Passenger statistics ==
In fiscal 2019, the station was used by an average of 3104 passengers daily (boarding passengers only).

== Surrounding area ==
- Nikkō Station on the JR East Nikkō Line
- Nikkō Police Station
- Nikkō Fire Station

== Bus service ==
=== Tobu Nikko Station Bus stop ===
==== Route and Highway Buses ====
Bus stop	No.	Via	Destination	Company	Notes
2A	Y	Chūzenji Onsen Station (Lake Chūzenji)	Yumoto Onsen	■Tobu Bus Nikko	
2A	YK	Chūzenji Onsen Station・Kotoku Onsen (Nikko Astraea Hotel)	Yumoto Onsen	■Tobu Bus Nikko	
2B	W	(Circular-route bus for the World Heritage Site); Hotel Seikoen mae ・ Shōdō-shōnin zō mae ・ Omote-sando ・ Nishi-sando ・ Jinja-mae(Rinnō-ji)・Nikkō Tōshōgū・Futarasan Shrine・Tobu Nikko	Nikko Station	■Tobu Bus Nikko	
2C	H HY	Nishi-Sando (Nikkō Tōshōgū)・Tamozawa Goyōtei	Okuhosoo	■Tobu Bus Nikko	
2C	M	Nikkō Tōshōgū・Tamozawa Goyōtei・Yashio no Yu	Kiyotaki	■Tobu Bus Nikko	
2C	C	Nishi-Sando (Nikkō Tōshōgū)・Tamozawa Goyōtei・Akechidaira	Chūzenji Onsen	■Tobu Bus Nikko	
2C	N		Nishi-Sandō	■Tobu Bus Nikko	
2C	SL	Taiyū-In(Rinno-ji)	Futarasan Shrine	■Tobu Bus Nikko	
2D	K		Kirifuri Kōgen	■Tobu Bus Nikko	Operated during summer (Between April and November)
2D	T	Nikko Kirifuri Skate Center	Kirifurinotaki	■Tobu Bus Nikko	Operated during winter (Between December and March)
2D	SL		Kinugawaonsen Station	■Tobu Bus Nikko	Operated when there are services of SL Taiju on holidays
2E	YH (Highway bus)	Haneda Airport	Yokohama Station	■Tobu Bus Nikko ■Keikyu Bus	
2E	TokyoーNikko・Kinugawa Line (Highway bus)	Non stop	Tokyo Station	Tohoku-Kyūkō Bus	
2E	S Nikko Regular Sightseeing Bus	Shinkyō (神橋)・Chuzen-ji・Kegon Falls	Kinugawaonsen Station	■Tobu Bus Nikko	Passengers have to reserve the seats. But, when there are vacant seats passengers can ride on this bus routes.

==== Nikko Municipal Bus ====
Bus stop	No	Via	Destination	Company
Nikko Municipal Bus		Matō Station・Ashio Station・Tsūdō Station(Ashio Copper Mine)	Sōai Hospital	Nikko Shiei Bus
Nikko Municipal Bus			Shimo-Imaichi Station	Nikko Shiei Bus

==== Nikko Kinugawa Express ====
- Nikko Kotsu
  - For Kinugawaonsen Station

=== Nikko Station Bus stop ===
The bus stop is located on Japan National Route 119 between Nikko Station and Tobu-Nikko Station.

==== Route bus ====
Bus stop	No	Via	Destination	Company
Kanto Jidosya			Nikkō Tōshōgū	Kanto Jidōsha
Kanto Jidosya		Bunsei University of Art	Utsunomiya Station	Kanto Jidōsha

==== Highway Bus ====
Bus stop	No	Via	Destination	Company
Highway bus	Marronnier	Non stop	Narita Airport	Kanto Jidōsya and Chiba Kōtsū

== See also ==
- List of railway stations in Japan
