= Fubasami Station =

Railway station in Nikkō, Tochigi Prefecture, Japan

Fubasami Station 文挟駅
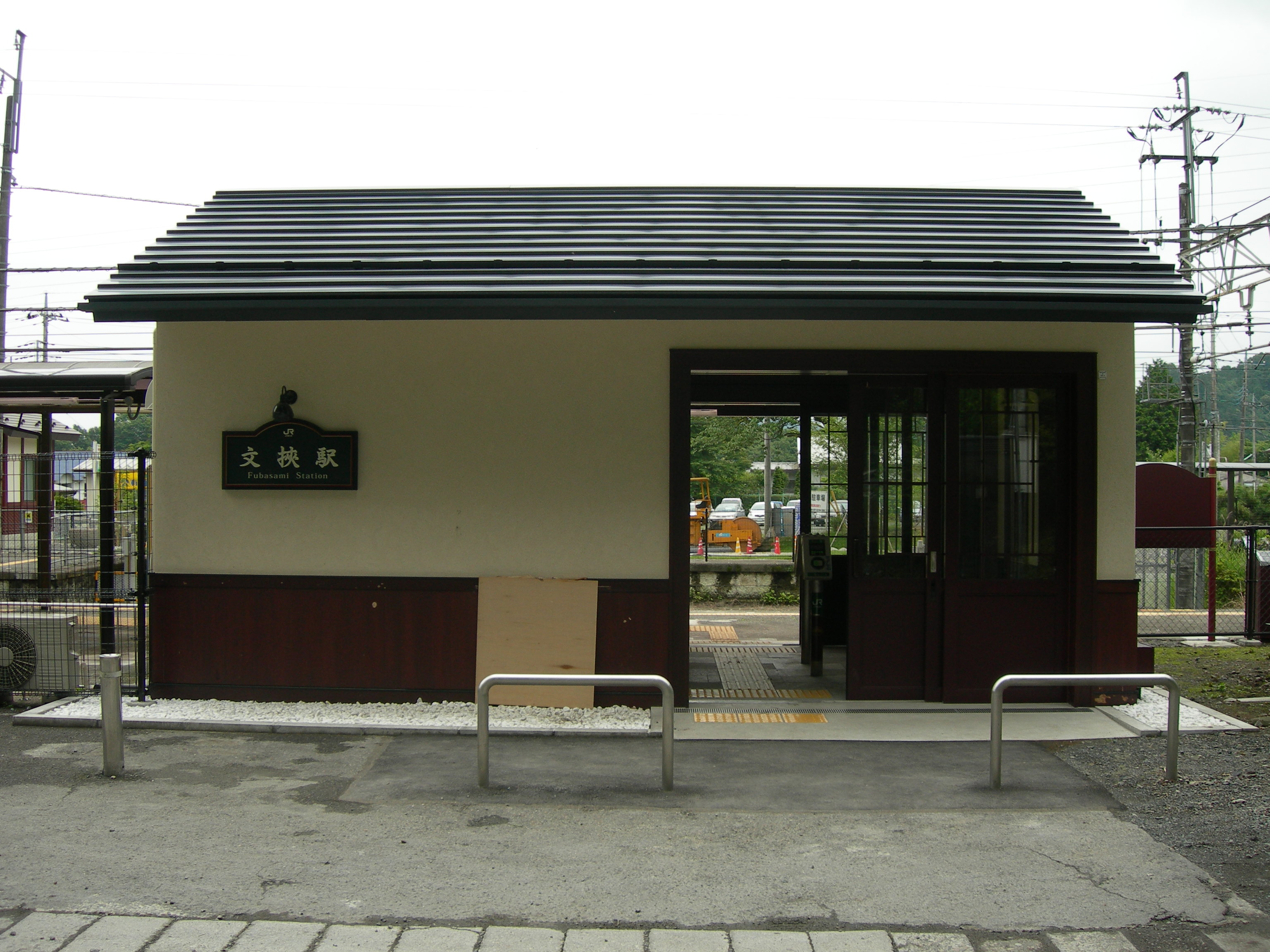
- Fubasami Station in June 2009

General information
- Location: Kogura, Nikkō-shi, Tochigi-ken 321-1106; Japan
- Coordinates: 36.6376°N 139.7277°E
- Operator: JR East
- Line: ■ Nikkō Line
- Distance: 22.4 km from Utsunomiya
- Platforms: 2 side platforms
- Tracks: 2

Other information
- Status: Unstaffed
- Website: Official website

History
- Opened: 1 June 1890

Passengers
- FY2009: 263

Services
Preceding station	JR East	Following station
Shimotsuke-Ōsawa towards Nikkō	Nikkō Line	Kanuma towards Utsunomiya
Location
- Location within Tochigi Prefecture Location within Japan

Fubasami Station (文挟駅, Fubasami-eki) is a railway station in the city Nikkō, Tochigi, Japan, operated by the East Japan Railway Company (JR East).

== Lines ==
Fubasami Station is served by the Nikkō Line, and is located 22.4 kilometers from the starting point of the line at Utsunomiya.

== Station layout ==
The station consists of two opposed side platforms, connected to the station building by a footbridge. The station is unattended.

=== Platforms ===
1	■ Nikkō Line	for Imaichi and Nikkō
2	■ Nikkō Line	for Utsunomiya

== History ==
The station opened on 1 June 1890. On 1 February 1970, cargo handling was discontinued. On 14 March, an overpass was built to allow passengers to walk across the station safely, with baggage handling discontinued the next day. On 1 October 1971, the station was converted into an unstaffed station. Ownership went to JR East due to the privatization and division of the Japanese National Railways. On 15 March 2008, the Tokyo metropolitan area expanded, and the IC card "Suica" was introduced. This coincided with the beginning of the operations of the east exit station building.

== Surrounding area ==
- National Route 121
- Cedar Avenue of Nikkō

== See also ==
- List of railway stations in Japan
