= Utsunomiya Station =

Railway station in Utsunomiya, Tochigi Prefecture, Japan

Utsunomiya Station 宇都宮駅
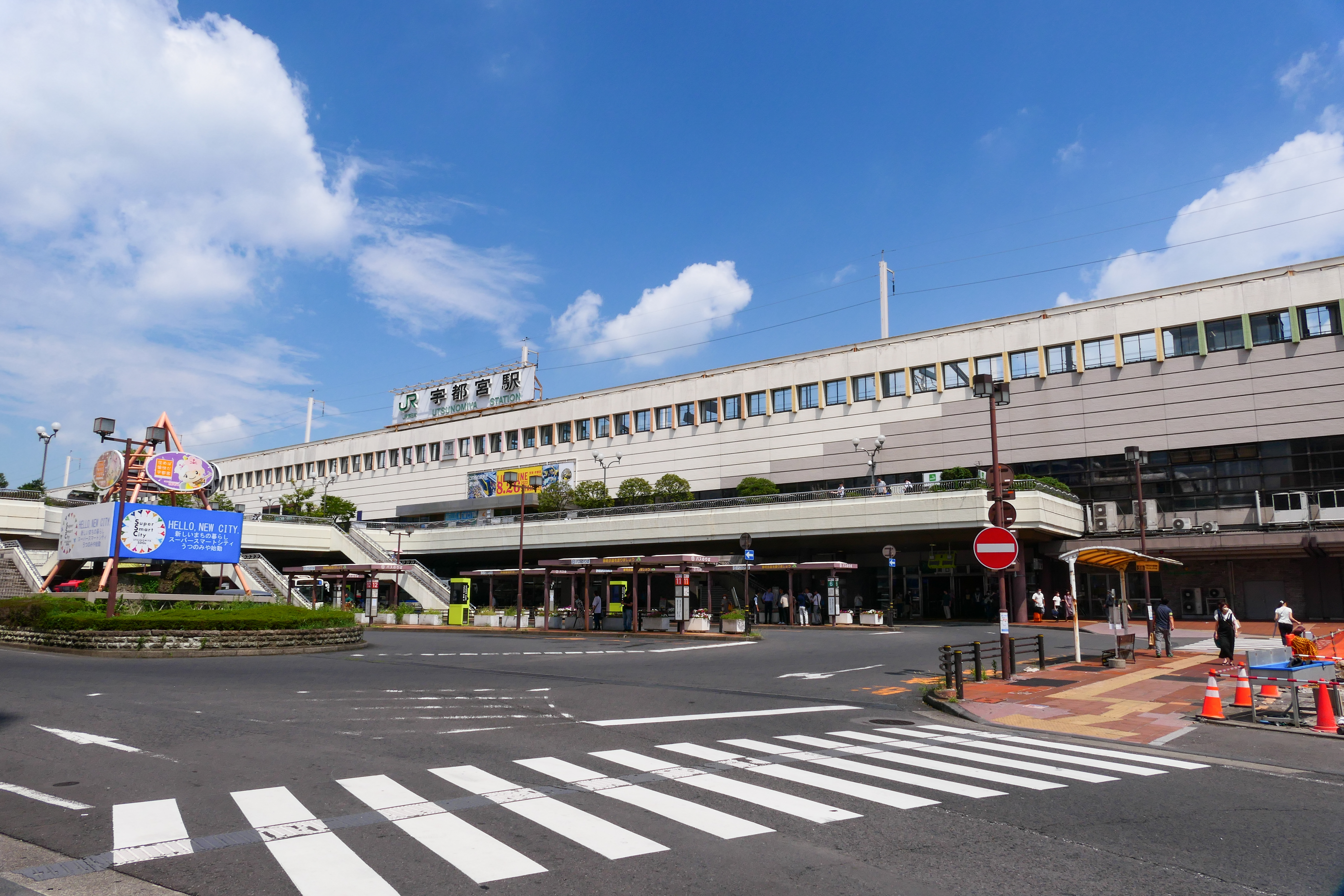
- Station and the connecting pedestrian walkway, 2023

General information
- Location: 1-23 Kawamukocho, Utsunomiya-shi, Tochigi 321-0965; Japan
- Coordinates: 36.559532°N 139.898529°E
- Operator: JR East; JR Freight
- Lines: Tōhoku Shinkansen; Yamagata Shinkansen; Tōhoku Main Line (Utsunomiya Line); Nikkō Line
- Distance: 109.5 km from Tokyo
- Connections: Utsunomiya Light Rail; Bus terminal

Other information
- Status: Staffed ( Midori no Madoguchi )
- Website: Official website

History
- Opened: 16 July 1885; 141 years ago

Passengers
- FY2019: 37,374

Services
Preceding station	JR East	Following station
Oyama towards Tokyo	Tōhoku Shinkansen Yamabiko	Nasu-Shiobara towards Morioka
Oyama towards Tokyo	Tōhoku Shinkansen Nasuno	Nasu-Shiobara towards Kōriyama
Ōmiya towards Tokyo	Yamagata Shinkansen Tsubasa	Kōriyama towards Shinjō
Suzumenomiya One-way operation	Utsunomiya Line Rapid Rabbit	Terminus
Suzumenomiya towards Tokyo	Utsunomiya Line Local	Okamoto towards Kuroiso
Terminus	Karasuyama Line	Okamoto towards Karasuyama
Suzumenomiya towards Zushi	Shōnan–Shinjuku Line Rapid Local	Terminus
Tsuruta towards Nikkō	Nikkō Line	Terminus
Location
- Location within Tochigi Prefecture Location within Japan

Utsunomiya Station (宇都宮駅, Utsunomiya-eki) is a railway station in the city of Utsunomiya, Tochigi Prefecture, Japan, operated by the East Japan Railway Company (JR East). The station also is a freight depot for the Japan Freight Railway Company (JR Freight).

Utsunomiya Station East is the current terminus of the Utsunomiya Light Rail line located in front of the East Exit, while Tōbu-Utsunomiya Station is located 1.6 km west of this station.

== Lines ==
Utsunomiya Station is served by the following JR East lines:

- Tōhoku Shinkansen
- Utsunomiya Line (Tōhoku Main Line)
- Shōnan–Shinjuku Line (Direct service to Zushi and Shinjuku via the Utsunomiya Line from Utsunomiya to Ōmiya.)
- Nikkō Line
- Karasuyama Line (Limited direct service. Most trips require a transfer at Hōshakuji.)

== Layout ==
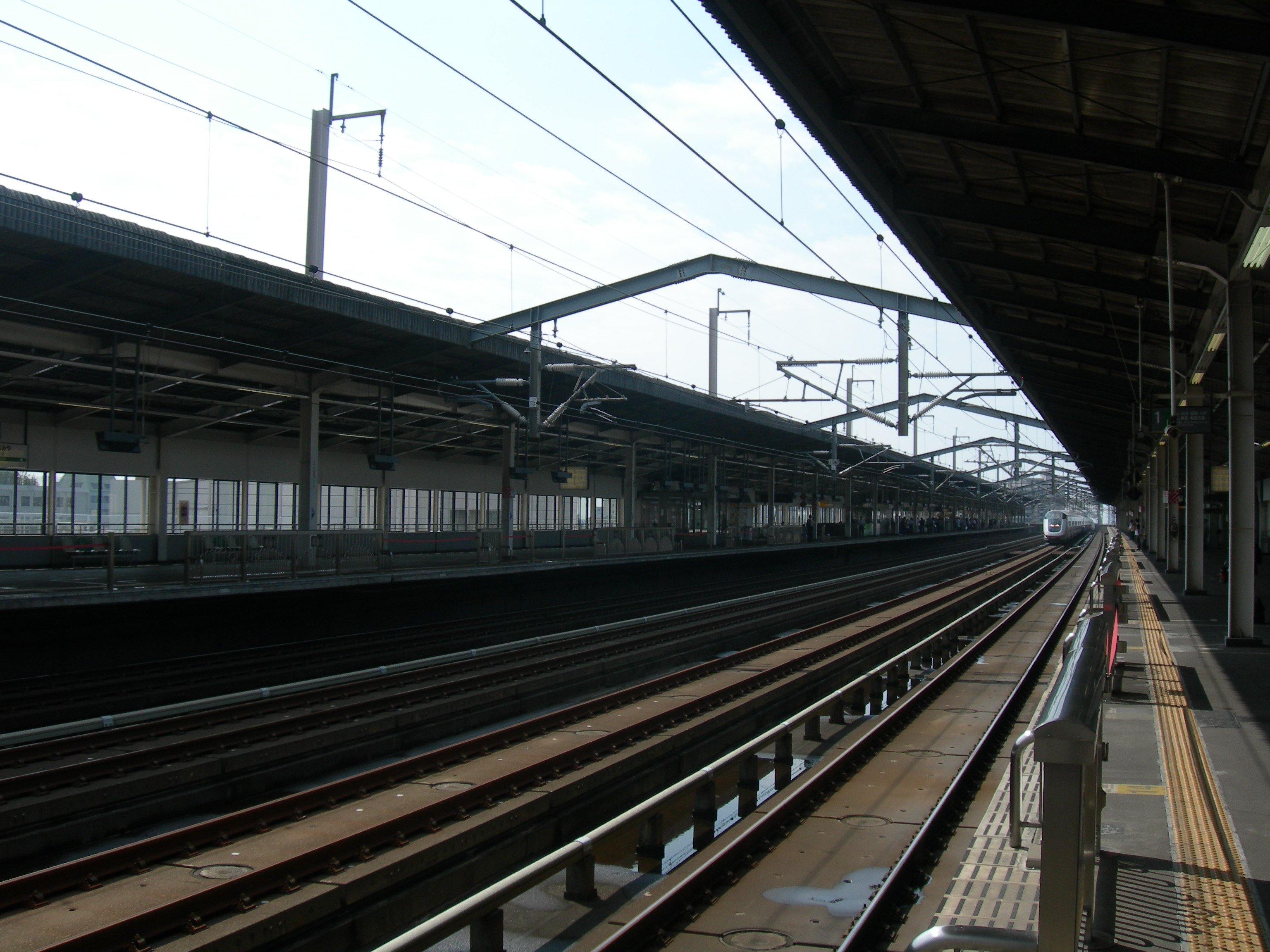
Shinkansen platform

The elevated Shinkansen platforms are designed to handle 16-car trains. Inbound and outbound trains have their own platform. An additional two through (passing) tracks (tracks 2 and 3) are located between the platforms.

The platforms for local trains are a combination of both island and individual platforms, designed to handle 15-car trains. A side track (often used for freight trains) is located between platforms 5 and 7.

LED information signboards are located on the 2nd-floor concourse both outside and within the ticket gates. Further LED signboards are located on each individual platform.

=== Platforms ===
1	■ Tohoku Shinkansen	for Nasushiobara, Fukushima, Sendai, Morioka
1	■ Yamagata Shinkansen	for Yamagata and Shinjo
4	■ Tohoku Shinkansen	for Ōmiya, Ueno, and Tokyo
5	■ Nikko Line	for Kanuma, Imaichi, and Nikko
7-10	■ Utsunomiya Line	for Nasushiobara and Kuroiso (Some direct through services to Karasuyama Line)
7-10	■ Utsunomiya Line	for Oyama
7-10	■ Utsunomiya Line (Ueno-Tokyo Line)	for Ōmiya, Ueno, Tokyo, Yokohama, Atami, Numazu and Ito (via Tokaido Line and Ito Line)
7-10	■ Shonan-Shinjuku Line	for Ōmiya, Shinjuku, Yokohama, Ōfuna and Zushi (via Yokosuka Line)

Some Nikkō Line trains operate from platform 7. Some Utsunomiya Line trains operate from platform 5.

== History ==
- July 16, 1885: Station opens on what is now the Tōhoku Main Line.
- June 1, 1890: Nikkō Line begins operation
- June 23, 1982: Tōhoku Shinkansen begins operation
- November 18, 2001: Introduction of Suica-enabled ticket gates.
- October 12, 2003: Introduction of Suica-enabled ticket gates for Shinkansen passes.
- January 29, 2008: Introduction of Suica-only ticket gates.
- March 2019: Discontinued operating services bound for Takasaki Station via Shin-Maebashi Station on Ryomo Line, which last for 60 years since 1958.
- August 26, 2023: Utsunomiya Light Rail started operation of the Utsunomiya Haga Light Rail Line and held an opening ceremony near Utsunomiya Station East.

== Passenger statistics ==
In fiscal 2019, the station was used by an average of 37,374 passengers daily (boarding passengers only).

== Utsunomiya Light Rail ==
=== Utsunomiya Station East ===
Utsunomiya Station East 宇都宮駅東口停留場
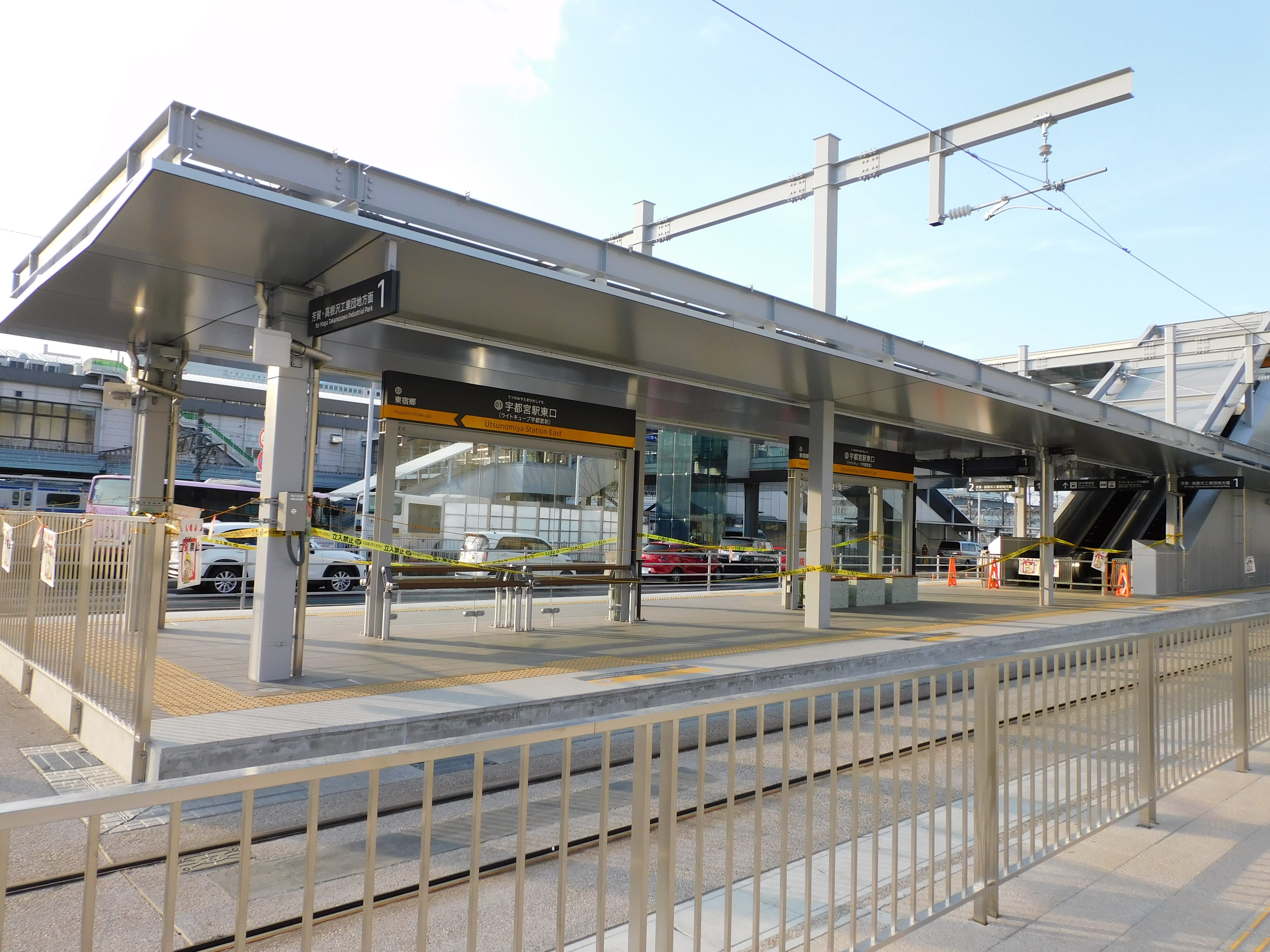
- Platform (March 2023)

General information
- Other names: Light Cube Utsunomiya-mae
- Location: 1 Miyamirai, Utsunomiya, Tochigi 321-0969; Japan
- System: light rail station
- Owner: Utsunomiya City and Haga Town
- Manager: Utsunomiya Light Rail
- Line: Utsunomiya Haga Light Rail Line
- Distance: 0.0 km
- Platforms: 1 island platform
- Tracks: 2
- Tram routes: 1
- Tram operators: Utsunomiya Light Rail
- Connections: Bus, taxi, and park and ride

Construction
- Structure type: at-grade

Other information
- Status: Staffed
- Station code: 01

History
- Opened: 26 August 2023

Passengers
- FY2024: 9,639 (daily) ▲6.06%

Services
Preceding station	Utsunomiya Light Rail	Following station
Terminus	Utsunomiya Haga Light Rail Line Rapid	Utsunomiya University Yoto Campus towards Haga Takanezawa Industrial Park
Terminus	Utsunomiya Haga Light Rail Line Local	Higashi-Shukugo towards Haga Takanezawa Industrial Park
Location

Utsunomiya Station East (宇都宮駅東口, Utsunomiya-eki Higashi-guchi) is the current terminus of the light rail line, located in front of the East Exit. The station is also called "Light Cube Utsunomiya-mae" (ライトキューブ宇都宮前) named after the nearby convention center Light Cube Utsunomiya.

During FY2024, the station was used on average by 9,639 passengers daily.

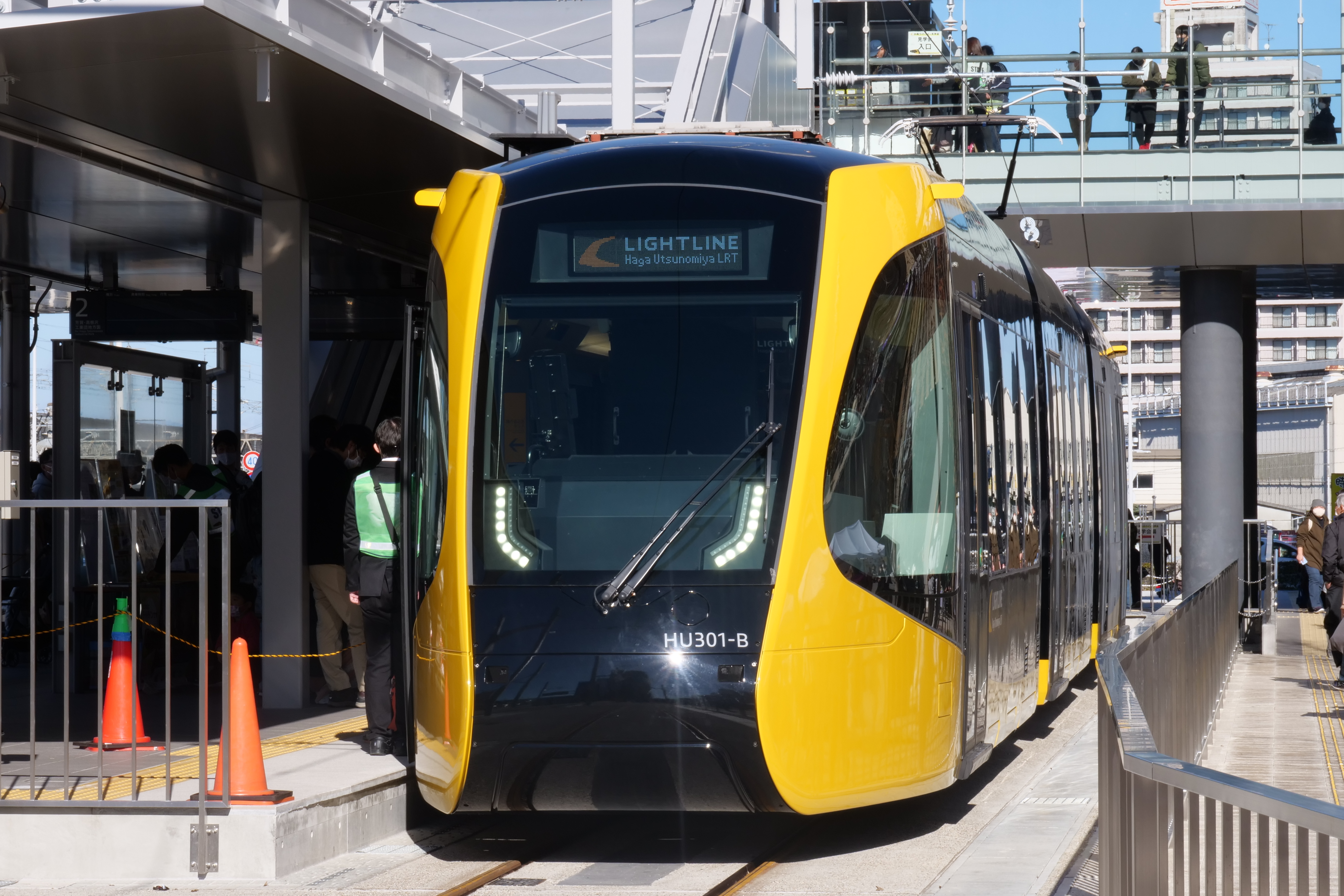
Utsunomiya Light Rail HU300 series branded "Lightline" at Utsunomiya Station East

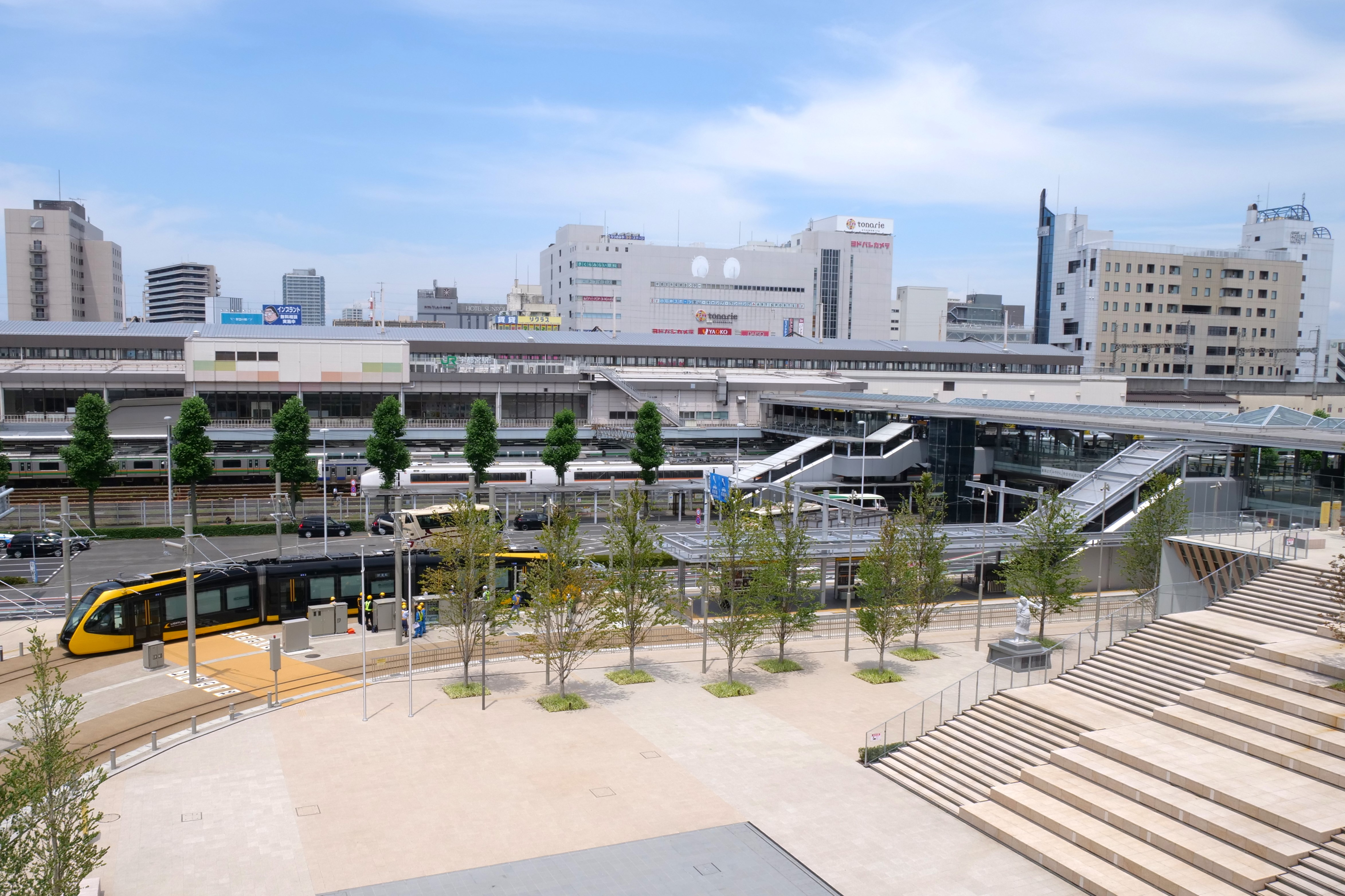
The East Exit (July 2023)

=== Utsunomiya Station West ===
Utsunomiya Light Rail has an extension plan to overcross the JR conventional lines, undercross the elevated Tohoku Shinkansen line, open another station in front of the West Exit, JR Utsunomiya Station West entrance (JR宇都宮駅西口, JR Utsunomiya-eki Nishiguchi), and extend the line to Tochigi Education Center where points 3km further west. It is scheduled to open in the 2030s.

Map of the Utsunomiya Haga Line (shown in yellow)

== Bus routes ==
=== West Exit ===
==== Track 1,2 ====
Operator	NO	Via	Destination	Note
Kanto Jidosha	33	Utsunomiya Castle・Tōbu-Utsunomiya Station	(Circular-route) Utsunomiya Station	Only one service is operated on weekdays morning
Kanto Jidosha	50	Tōbu-Utsunomiya Station・Kiyosumicho・Takaragi	Hosoya Shako	There are midnight buses
Kanto Jidosha	53	Tōbu-Utsunomiya Station・Oshouduka・Takaragi	Hosoya Shako	
Kanto Jidosha	54	Nishi-Hanawada	Tomatsuri	Only one service is operated on weekdays morning
Kanto Jidosha	54	Nishi-Hanawada・Tomatsuri	Takaragi Danchi	
Kanto Jidosha	54	Nishi-Hanawada・Daiichi Green Hill・Nishi-Hanawada	(Circular-route) Utsunomiya Station	
Kanto Jidosha	55	Tōbu-Utsunomiya Station・Sakushin Gakuin University・Takaragi	Hosoya Shako	
Kanto Jidosha	55	Tōbu-Utsunomiya Station・Sakushin Gakuin University・Takaragi	Takaragi danchi	
Kanto Jidosha	60	Miyajimacho Jumonji・Toyosato Chuo Elementary school	Teikyo University	There is a service of a midnight bus on weekdays
Kanto Jidosha		Babacho	Utsunomiya Tobu; Nishihaea Shako	

==== Track 3 ====
It is possible for passengers who have valid Japan Rail Pass to use following all bus routes operated by JR Bus Kanto for free.

Operator	NO	Via	Destination	Note
JR BUS KANTO	11・Suito Nishi Line	Utsunomiya University・Koteyama Jūjiro・Dōjōjuku・Haga Industrial Park Management Center・Haga Onsen Roman no Yu・Ubagai・Haga Town Hall East・Ichihana eki iriguchi	Motegi Station	
JR BUS KANTO	11・Suito Nishi Line	Tōbu eki mae・Sakuradōri Jūmonji	Sakushin Gakuin High School	

==== Track 4 ====
Track 4 has not been used since August 27, 2023.

==== Track 5 ====
Buses bound for Fujimigaoka via Hanada and Utsunomiya Commercial high school or Takebayashi and FKD operated by Kanto Transportation depart from and arrive at this track.

Operator	NO	Via	Destination	Note
Kanto Transportation	16	Imaizumi 5 chome・Takebayashi Jumonji	Fujimigaoka Danchi	
Kanto Transportation	16	Imaizumi 5 chome・Takebayahsi Jumonji・Saiseikai Hospital	Fujimigaoka Danchi	
Kanto Transportation	16	Miyajimacho Jumonji・Utsunomiya Commercial Highschool	Fujimigaoka Danchi	
Kanto Transportation	18	Imaizumi 5 chome・Takebayshi Jumonji	Saiseikai Hospital	
Kanto Transportation	60	Imaizumi 5 chome・Takebayashi Jumonji・Saiseikai Hospital・Ustunomiya Kita Highschool・Toyosato Chuo Elementary School	Teikyo University	
Kanto Transportation	60	Miyajima Jumonji・Utsunomiya Commercial Highschool・Toyosato Chuo Elementary school	Toyosatodai or Teikyo University	There are services which don't stop at all bus stops between this bus stop and Teikyo University the last.
Kanto Transportation	60	Miyajima Jumonji・Utsunomiya Commercial Highschool・Toyosato Chuo Elementary school・Toyosatodai・Teikyo University	Utsunomiya Museum	
Kanto Transportation	61	Miyajima Jumonji・Utsunomiya Commercial Highschool・Toyosato Chuo Elementary school・Toyosatodai・Shimotahara	Utsunomiya Green Town	
Kanto Transportation	61	Miyajima Jumonji・Utsunomiya Commercial Highschool・Toyosato Chuo Elementary school・Shimo-Takarai	Utsunomiya Green Town	
Kanto Transportation	62	Miyajima Jumonji・Utsunomiya Commercial Highschool・Toyosato Chuo Elementary school・Shimotahara・Nakazatobara Jumonji	Imazato	
Kanto Transportation	62	Miyajima Jumonji・Utsunomiya Commercial Highschool・Toyosato Chuo Elementary school・Shimotahara・Nakazatobara Jumonji・Imazato・Omiya shitamachi	Tamanyu Shako	
Kanto Transportation	64	Miyajima Jumonji・Utsunomiya Commercial Highschool・Toyosato Chuo Elementary school・Toyosatodai・Taikyo University	New Fujimigaoka Danchi	

==== Track 6 ====
Buses bound for Otani Kaido Avenue via Babacho and Prefectural operated by Kanto Transportation depart from and arrive at this track.

Operator	NO	Via	Destination	Note
Kanto Transportation	10	Tōbu-Utsunomiya Station・Sakuradori Jumonji・Sakushin Gakuin University	Komanyu Office	There are partly services which bound for Sakushin Gakuin, and don't stop at all bus stops between this bus stop and Komanyu Office. There are midnight buses. The partly buses run on only weekdays bound for Komanyu via Tochigi Kenko no Mori.
Kanto Transportation	45	Tōbu-Utsunomiya Station・Sakuradori Jumonji・Sakushin Gakuin University・Shiroyama chiku Citizen Center・Oya Heiwa Kan'non・Oya Shiryokan	Tateiwa	
Kanto Transportation	46	Tōbu-Utsunomiya Station・Sakuradori Jumonji・Sakushin Gakuin University・Yozei junior high school・Takaragi・Niraduka	Romantic Village	
Kanto Transportation	47	Tōbu-Utsunomiya Station・Sakuradori Jumonji・Sakushin Gakuin University・Shiroyama chiku Citizen Center・New Sunpia Tochigi・Kanuma Station・Tori-ato machi	Kanuma Office	

==== Track 7 ====
Operator	NO	Via	Destination	Note
Kanto Transportation	10 and so on	Tōbu-Utsunomiya Station・Sakuradori Jumonji・Sakushin Gakuin University	Komanyu Office	There are partly services which bound for Sakushin Gakuin, and don't stop at all bus stops between this bus stop and Komanyu Office. The partly buses run on only weekdays bound for Komanyu via Tochigi Kenko no Mori.

==== Track 8 ====
Operator	NO	Via	Destination	Note
Kanto Transportation	51	Tōbu-Utsunomiya Station・Sakuradori Jumonji・Tochigi Medical Center・Tomatsuri・Takaragi・Niraduka	Romantic Village	
Kanto Transportation	52	Tōbu-Utsunomiya Station・Sakuradori Jumonji・Tochigi Medical Center・Bunsei University of Art	Sano Apartment Complex	
Kanto Transportation	52	Tōbu-Utsunomiya Station・Sakuradori Jumonji・Tochigi Medical Center・Bunsei University of Art・Naka-Tokujira	Ishinada	
Kanto Transportation	52	Tōbu-Utsunomiya Station・Sakuradori Jumonji・Tochigi Medical Center・Bunsei University of Art・Naka-Tokujira・Ishinada	Shinoi New Town	Run on only one service on weekdays afternoon
Kanto Transportation	56	Tōbu-Utsunomiya Station・Sakuradori Jumonji・Tochigi Medical Center・Bunsei University of Art・Naka-Tokujira・Ishinada・Ebi-uchi・Shimo-Osawa	Imaichi Shako	
Kanto Transportation	56	Tōbu-Utsunomiya Station・Sakuradori Jumonji・Tochigi Medical Center・Bunsei University of Art・Naka-Tokujira・Ishinada・Shinoi New Town・Shimo-Osawa	Imaichi Shako	
Kanto Transportation	56	Tōbu-Utsunomiya Station・Sakuradori Jumonji・Tochigi Medical Center・Bunsei University of Art・Naka-Tokujira・Ishinada・Ebi-uchi・Shimo-Osawa・Nikkō Station・Tōbu-Nikkō Station	Nikkō Tōshō-gū	
Kanto Transportation	56	Tōbu-Utsunomiya Station・Sakuradori Jumonji・Tochigi Medical Center・Bunsei University of Art・Naka-Tokujira・Ishinada・Shinoi New Town・Shimo-Osawa・Nikkō Station・Tōbu-Nikkō Station	Nikkō Tōshō-gū	
Kanto Transportation	58	Tōbu-Utsunomiya Station・Sakuradori Jumonji・Tochigi Medical Center・Bunsei University of Art・Naka-Tokujira・Ishinada・Shinoi Gakudo・Shiono muro・Sanuki Kan'non	Funyu	
Kanto Transportation	70	Imaizumi 5 chome・Takebayashi Jumonji・Horikiri・Nakakaidocho	Kamaidai Danchi	
Kanto Transportation	71	Imaizumi 5 chome・Takebayashi Jumonji・Horikiri・Nakakaidocho・Kawachi chiiki jichi Center	Shirasawa Kawara	
Kanto Transportation	71	Imaizumi 5 chome・Takebayashi Jumonji・Horikiri・Natsubodai Chuo・Kawachi chiiki jichi Center	Shirasawa Kawara	
Kanto Transportation	73	Imaizumi 5 chome・Takebayashi Jumonji・Horikiri・Miyukigahara Elementary School	Natsubodai Chuo	

==== Track 9 ====
Operator	NO	Via	Destination	Note
Kanto Transportation	12	Hakuyo High school・koshido・Karahiraide iriguchi	Yanada Shako	
Kanto Transportation	12	Hakuyo High school・koshido・Karahiraide iriguchi	Matsusita Denki	
Kanto Transportation	80	Joto Elementary・Yanase Kanabori・Hiramatsu Juku・Higashi High School	Mizuhono Danchi	
Kanto Transportation	80	Joto Elementary・Yanase Kanabori・Hiramatsu Juku・Higashi High school・Midori no Sato irguchi	Mizuhono Danchi	
Kanto Transportation	81	Joto Elementary・Yanase Kanabori・Hiramatsu Juku・Shimo-Kuwajima	Higashi Fuzakashi	
Kanto Transportation	83	Joto Elementary・Yanase Kanabori・Hiramatsu Juku	Oroshi-kaikan mae	
Kanto Transportation	84	Joto Elementary・Yanase Kanabori・Hiramatsu juku・Higashi Highschool・Mizuhono Danchi・Mandorokoro joganji・Hongodai	Hongodai Nishi Fuzakashi	
Kanto Transportation	85	Chuo Shijo mae・Yanase Kanebori・Higashi Kawata・Yaita Yubinkyoku mae・Minami High school・Kami-Kamo	Kami-Mikawa Shako	
Kanto Transportation	85	Chuo Shijo mae・Yanase Kanebori・Higashi Kawata・Yaita Yubinkyoku mae・Minami High school・Inter Park Utsunomiya minami・Kami-Kamo	Kami-Mikawa Shako	

==== Track 10 ====
Operator	NO	Via	Destination	Note
Kanto Transportation	40	Tōbu-Utsunomiya Station・Sakura Dori Jumonji・Mitsu no Sawa	Nishi no Miya Danchi	
Kanto Transportation	43	Tōbu-Utsunomiya Station・Sakura Dori Jumonji・Mitsu no Sawa・Nojiri	Togami Shako	
Kanto Transportation	43	Tōbu-Utsunomiya Station・Sakura Dori Jumonji・Mitsu no Sawa・Nojiri・Nagasaka sakaue・Shirokuwata・Kanuma Station・Toriiato machi	Kanuma Office	
Kanto Transportation	43	Tōbu-Utsunomiya Station・Sakura Dori Jumonji・Mitsu no Sawa・Nojiri・Utsunomiya Kyowa University・Utsunomiya Junior College・Nagasaka sakaue・Shirokuwata・Kanuma Station・Toriiato machi	Kanuma Office	Any service doesn't pass through Utsunomiya Kyowa University or Utsunomiya Junior College when those schools are closed.

==== Track 11 ====
Operator	NO	Via	Destination	Note
Kanto Transportation	31	Tōbu-Utsunomiya Station・Ichijo Junior High school・Kawada iriguchi・Prefectural Cancer Center・Esojima Station・Midori 2 chome	Nishi Kawada higashi	There are midnight buses
Kanto Transportation	25	(via Kyokuryo Dori) Kawada iriguchi・Esojima 4 chome・Imanomiya 1 chome・Tochigi Prefectural Animal Welfare Center	Suzumenomiya Station	

==== Track 12 ====
- ［25］Suzumenomiya Jieitai・Ishibashi Station (Tochigi) via Ishibashi Highschool
- ［36］Tsuruta Station via Rokudo tsuji・Nishi Kawada higashi
- ［41］Tochigi Prefectural Driver License Center・Niregi Shako via Niregi Station
- Free Shuttle Bus - Utsunomiya Velodrome

==== Track 13 ====
- ［34］Tsuruta Station via Yozei Dori
- ［37］Tsuruta Station・Nishi-Kawada Station via Sakura Dori

==== Track 14 ====
Former Toya Kotsu (Kanto Transportation)

- Kazuhisa via Imaizumi 9 chome
- Okamoto Station (Tochigi) via Ueno Danchi
- Ujiie Station via Okamoto Station (Tochigi) and Hōshakuji Station
- Bell Mall/Seppo-ji/Kameyama/Hashiba/Mooka Office via Mōka Station
- Mashiko Station via Nanai Station and Togei Messe iriguchi ※There are partly services pass through Bell Mall
- Kaisei Joshi Gakuin
- Takebayahsi Jumonji/Hiraide Industrial Apartment Complex via Mine
- Bell Mall

==== Track 15 ====
Toya Kotsu (Kanto Transportation)

- Okamoto Station (Tochigi) via Miyukigahara Motomachi

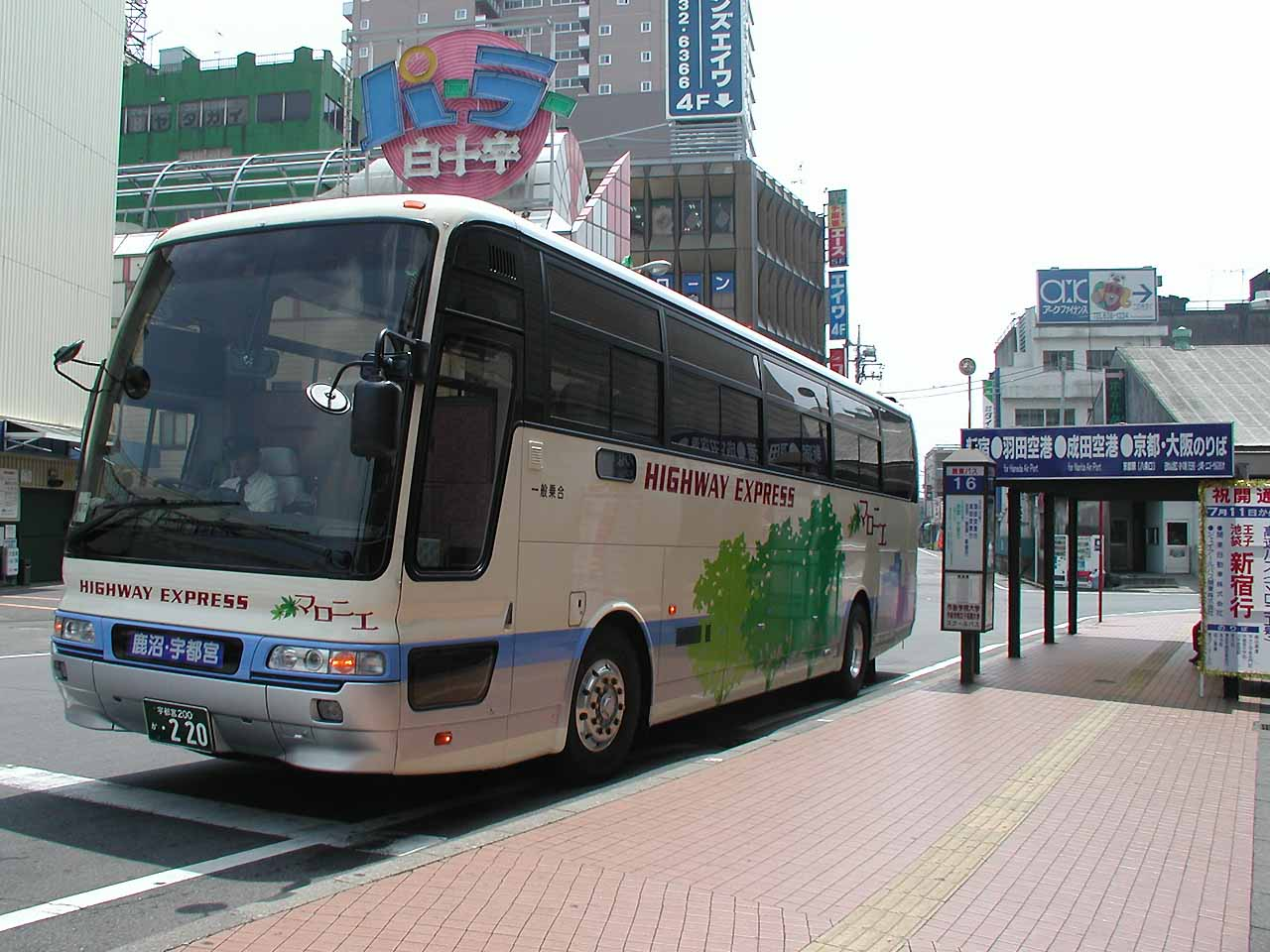
Track 16

==== Track 16 ====
Highway buses operated by Kanto Transportation depart from and arrive at this track.

- Marronnier (For Narita International Airport) (Kanto Transportation・Chiba Kotsu)
- Marronnier (For Haneda Airport) (Kanto Transportation・Airport Transport Service)
- Tochinoki (For Universal Studios Japan via Kyōto Station・Ōsaka Station) (Kanto Transportation・Kintetsu Bus)
- Night bus Nagoya Line (For Nagoya Station) (Fukushima Transportation・Meitetsu Bus)
- Kita-Kanto Liner (For Mito Station via Akatsuka Station) (Kanto Transportation・Ibaraki Transportation)
- School Bus - Sakushin Gakuin University

==== Track 38 ====
- [34] Utsunomiya City Circular-route Bus "Kibuna"

=== East Exit ===
==== Track 3 ====
Operator	NO	Via	Destination	Note
Kanto Transportation	02・Hiramatsu Honchō circular-line	Yanaze machi Jūmonji・Hiramatsu Honchō nishi・Ken'ei Hiramatsu Honchō Jūtaku mae・Hiramastu Honchō Kōminkan・Hiramatsu Honchō nishi・Yanaze machi Jūmonji	(Circular-route) Utsunomiya Station	
Kanto Transportation	02・Oroshi Danchi circular-line (Counter-clockwise)	Utsunomiya University・Hiramatsu Honchō・Oroshi Danchi・Higashi Mine machi	(Circular-route) Utsunomiya Station	
Kanto Transportation	02・Oroshi Danchi circular-line (Clockwise)	Utsunomiya University・Higashi Mine machi・Oroshi Danchi・Hiramatsu Honchō	(Circular-route) Utsunomiya Station	
Kanto Transportation	09	Utsunomiya University	Bell Mall	
Kanto Transportation	92	Utsunomiya University・Koteyama jūjiro	Hoshinomori Junior and Senior High School	Runs on only weekdays

==== Track 4 ====
Operator	Via	Destination	Note
Kanto Transportation (Toya Kotsu)	Miyukigahara Motomachi・Ueno Danchi	Okamoto Station West Exit	
Kanto Transportation (Toya Kotsu)	Miyukigahara Motomachi・Ueno Danchi・Okamoto Station West Exit	Wagu	
Kanto Transportation (Toya Kotsu)	Higashi Library・Kita Koshido chō	Hiraide Industrial Park	

== See also ==
- List of railway stations in Japan
