= Kanuma Station =

Railway station in Kanuma, Tochigi Prefecture, Japan

Kanuma Station 鹿沼駅
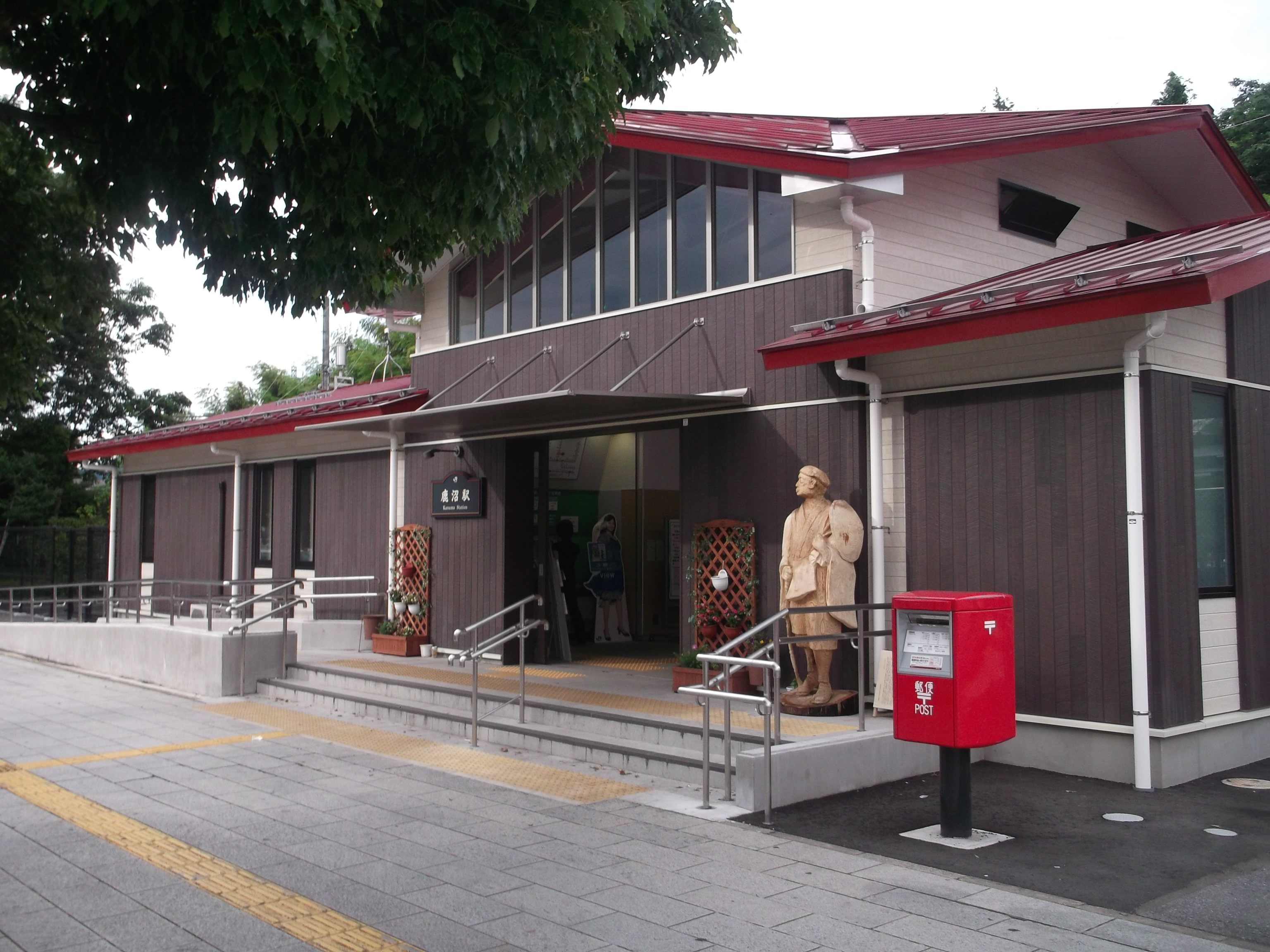
- Kanuma Station in July 2014

General information
- Location: Uwanomachi, Kanuma-shi, Tochigi-ken 322-0021; Japan
- Coordinates: 36.5711°N 139.7628°E
- Operator: JR East
- Line: ■ Nikkō Line
- Distance: 14.3 km from Utsunomiya
- Platforms: 1 side + island platform
- Tracks: 3

Other information
- Status: Staffed
- Website: Official website

History
- Opened: 1 June 1890

Passengers
- FY2019: 2064

Services
Preceding station	JR East	Following station
Fubasami towards Nikkō	Nikkō Line	Tsuruta towards Utsunomiya
Location
- Location within Tochigi Prefecture Location within Japan

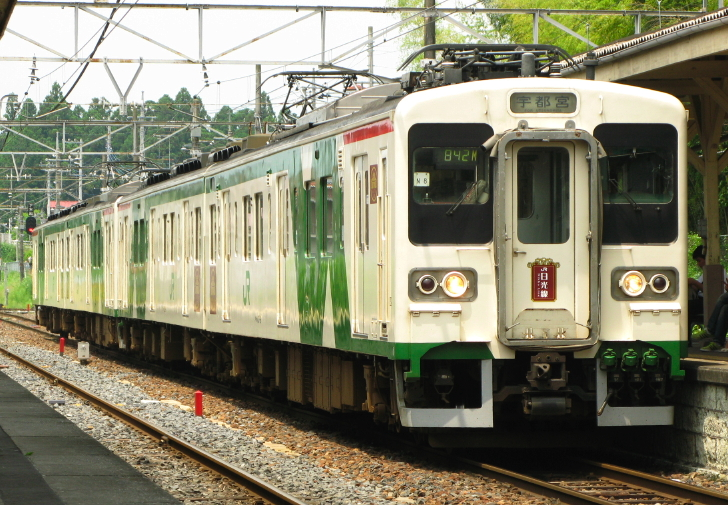
A 107 series train at Kanuma Station, June 2008

Kanuma Station (鹿沼駅, Kanuma-eki) is a railway station in the city of Kanuma, Tochigi, Japan, operated by the East Japan Railway Company (JR East).

== Lines ==
Kanuma Station is served by the Nikkō Line, and is located 14.3 kilometers from the starting point of the line at Utsunomiya.

== Station layout ==
The station consists of one island platform and one side platform, connected to the station building by a footbridge; however, one side of the island platform is not in operation.

=== Platforms ===
1	■ Nikkō Line	for Imaichi and Nikkō
2	■ Nikkō Line	for Utsunomiya

== History ==
Kanuma Station opened on 1 June 1890. On 1 April 1987, the station came under the control of JR East with the privatization of the Japanese National Railways (JNR).

== Passenger statistics ==
In fiscal 2019, the station was used by an average of 2064 passengers daily (boarding passengers only).

== Surrounding area ==
- Kanuma City Hall
- Kanuma Post Office

== See also ==
- List of railway stations in Japan
