= Tsuruta Station =

Railway station in Utsunomiya, Tochigi Prefecture, Japan

Tsuruta Station 鶴田駅
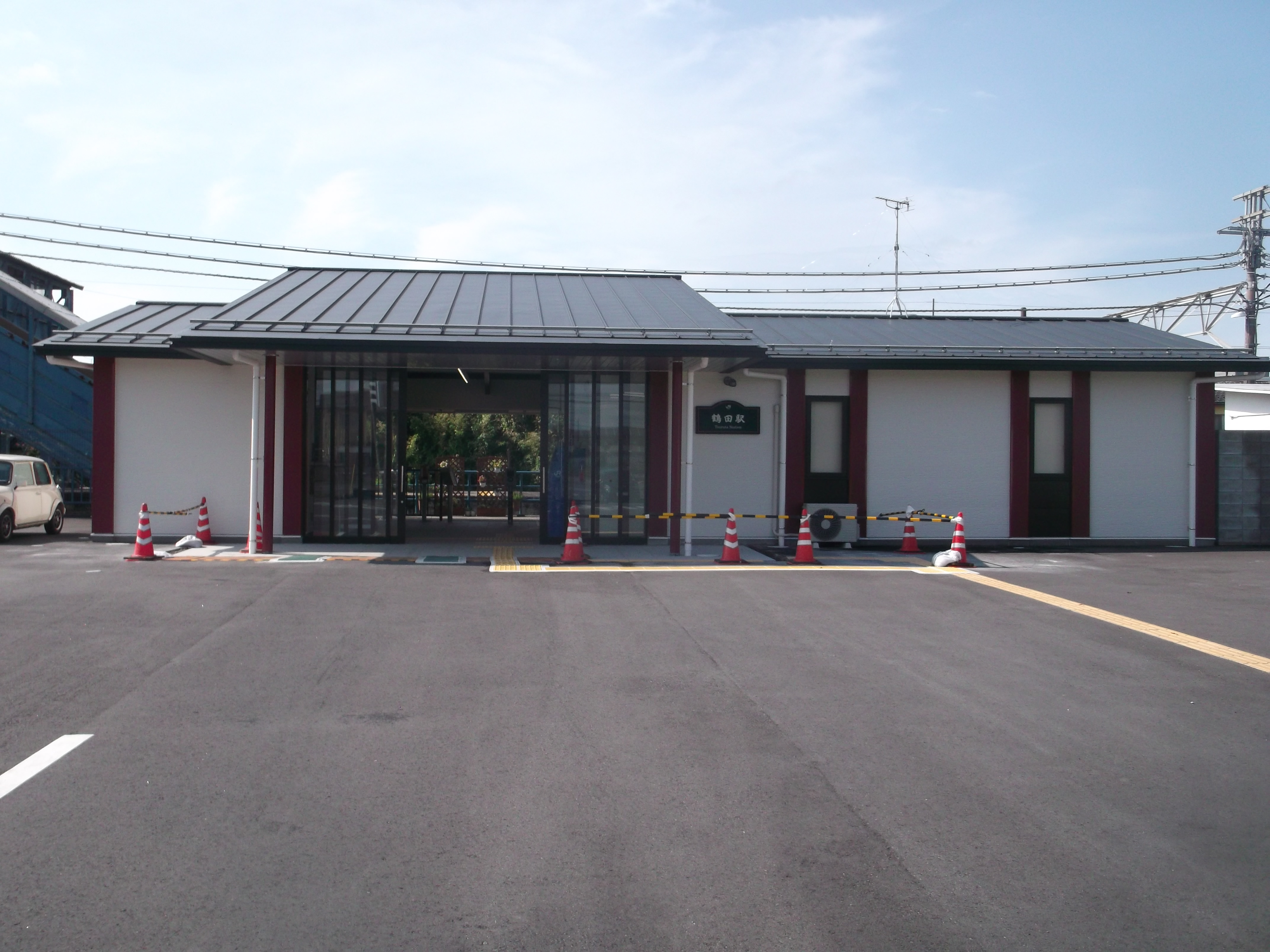
- Tsuruta Station in July 2014

General information
- Location: Nishikawata-machi, Utsunomiya-shi, Tochigi-ken 321-0151; Japan
- Coordinates: 36.5382°N 139.8587°E
- Operator: JR East
- Line: ■ Nikkō Line
- Distance: 4.8 km from Utsunomiya
- Platforms: 1 island platform
- Tracks: 2

Other information
- Status: Staffed
- Website: Official website

History
- Opened: 2 September 1902

Passengers
- FY2019: 1457

Services
Preceding station	JR East	Following station
Kanuma towards Nikkō	Nikkō Line	Utsunomiya Terminus
Location
- Location within Tochigi Prefecture Location within Japan

Tsuruta Station (鶴田駅, Tsuruta-eki) is a railway station in the city of Utsunomiya, Tochigi, Japan, operated by the East Japan Railway Company (JR East).

== Lines ==
Tsuruta Station is served by the Nikkō Line, and is located 4.8 kilometers from the starting point of the line at Utsunomiya.

== Station layout ==
The station consists of one island platform, serving two tracks and connected to the station building by a footbridge. The station is staffed.

=== Platforms ===
1	■ Nikkō Line	for Utsunomiya
2	■ Nikkō Line	for Kanuma, Imaichi, and Nikkō

== History ==
Tsuruta Station opened on 2 September 1902. Prior to this, the area was served by Togami Station (砥上駅), which was located to the west of present-day Tsuruta Station. Togami Station was closed with the opening of Tsuruta. On 1 April 1987, the station came under the control of JR East with the privatization of the Japanese National Railways (JNR). A new station building was completed in March 2014.

== Passenger statistics ==
In fiscal 2019, the station was used by an average of 1457 passengers daily (boarding passengers only).

== Surrounding area ==
- Esojima Station, on the Tobu Utsunomiya Line
- Tsuruta Ekimae Post Office

== See also ==
- List of railway stations in Japan
