= Shimotsuke-Ōsawa Station =

Railway station in Nikkō, Tochigi Prefecture, Japan

Shimotsuke-Ōsawa Station 下野大沢駅
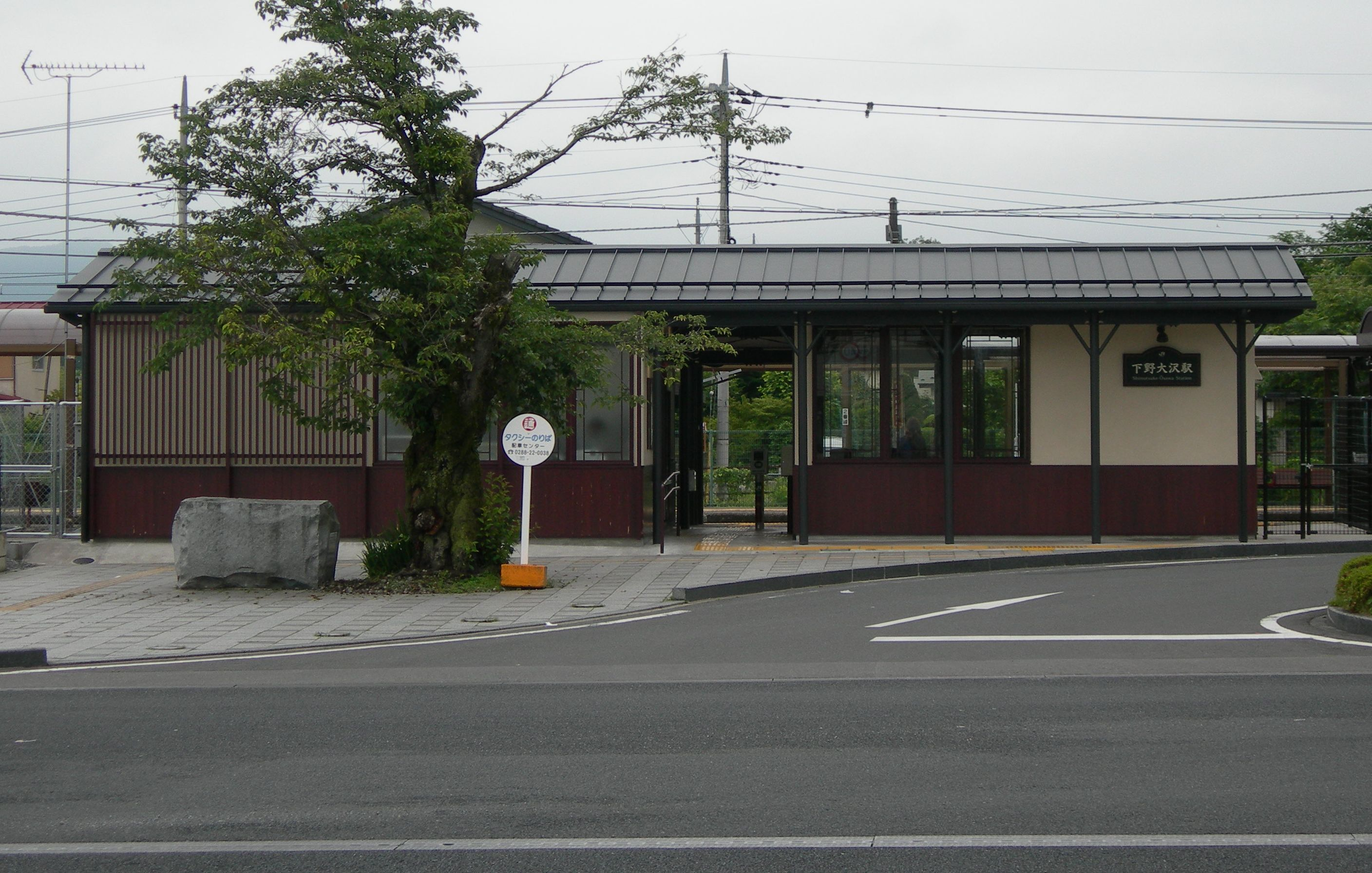
- Shimotsuke-Ōsawa Station in June 2009

General information
- Location: 557 Dosawa, Nikkō-shi, Tochigi-ken 321-1274; Japan
- Coordinates: 36°41′11.41″N 139°43′56.96″E
- Operator: JR East
- Line: ■ Nikkō Line
- Distance: 28.2 km from Utsunomiya
- Platforms: 2 side platforms
- Tracks: 2

Other information
- Status: Unstaffed
- Website: Official website

History
- Opened: 1 November 1929

Passengers
- FY2014: 731

Services
Preceding station	JR East	Following station
Imaichi towards Nikkō	Nikkō Line	Fubasami towards Utsunomiya
Location
- Location within Tochigi Prefecture Location within Japan

Shimotsuke-Ōsawa Station (下野大沢駅, Shimotsuke-Ōsawa-eki) is a railway station in the city of Nikkō, Tochigi, Japan, operated by the East Japan Railway Company (JR East).

== Lines ==
Shimotsuke-Ōsawa Station is served by the Nikkō Line, and is located 28.2 kilometers from the terminus of the line at Utsunomiya.

== Station layout ==
The station consists of two opposed side platform, connected to the station building by a footbridge. The station is unattended.

=== Platforms ===
1	■ Nikkō Line	for Utsunomiya
2	■ Nikkō Line	for Imaichi and Nikkō

== History ==
Shimotsuke-Ōsawa Station opened on 1 November 1929. On 1 April 1987 the station came under the control of JR East with the privatization of the Japan National Railways (JNR). A new station building was completed in 2010.

== Surrounding area ==
- Shimotsuke-Ōsawa Post Office

== See also ==
- List of railway stations in Japan
