= Nikkō Line =

Railway line in Tochigi prefecture, Japan

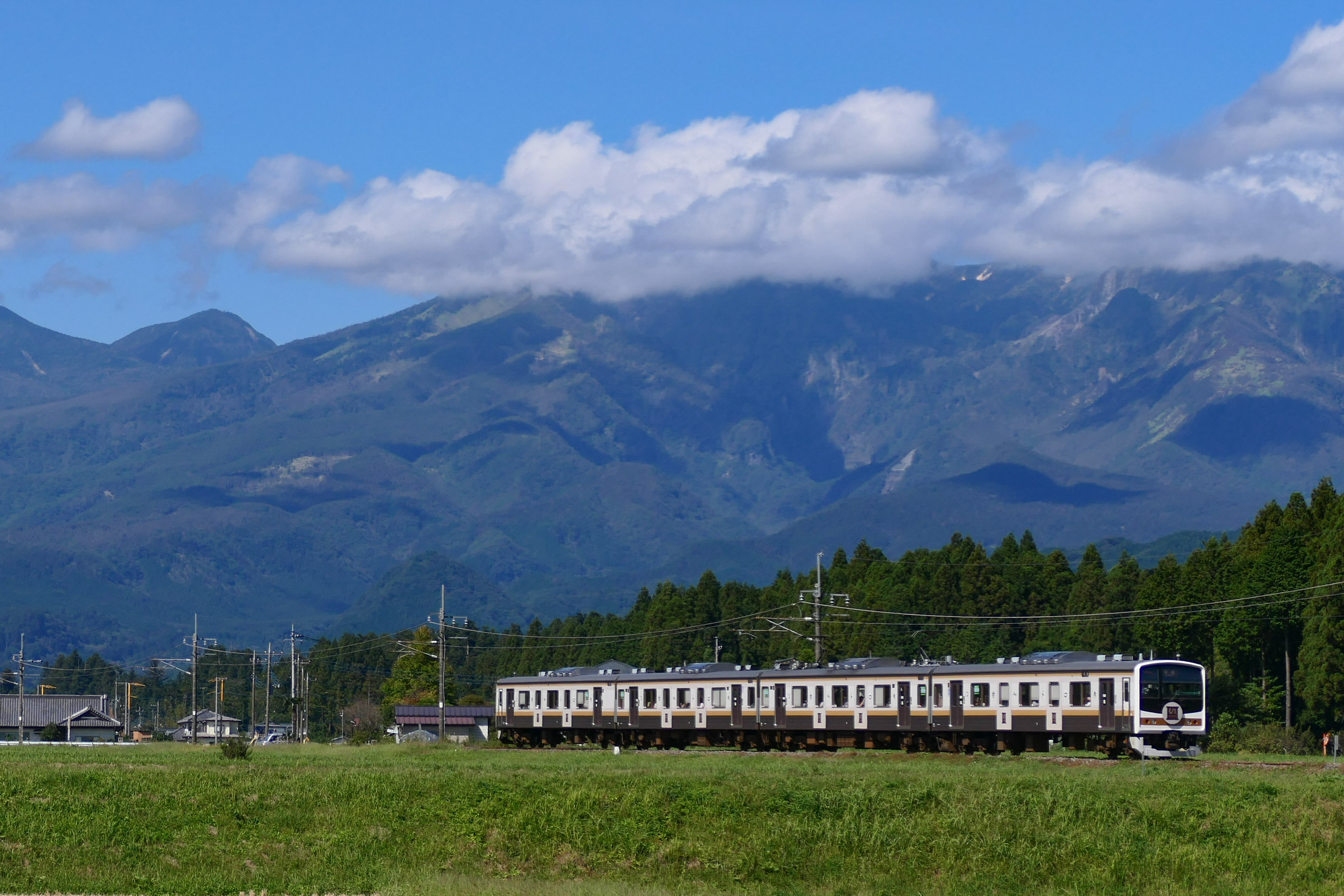
- A 205 series "Iroha" EMU on the Nikko Line in November 2020

Overview
- Owner: JR East
- Locale: Tochigi Prefecture
- Termini: Utsunomiya; Nikkō
- Stations: 7

Service
- Type: Regional rail
- Rolling stock: E131-600/-680 series EMUs

History
- Opened: June 1, 1890; 136 years ago

Technical
- Line length: 40.5 km (25.2 mi)
- Track gauge: 1,067 mm (3 ft 6 in)
- Electrification: 1,500 V DC overhead catenary
Route map

The Nikkō Line (日光線, Nikkō-sen) is a railway line operated by East Japan Railway Company (JR East) which connects Utsunomiya to Nikkō.

Both the Tobu and JR East railway stations in Nikkō are located within walking distance of each other.

== Station list ==
- Trains can pass each other at any station.

| Station | Japanese | Distance (km) | | Transfers | Location | |
| Station | Japanese | Between stations | Total | Transfers | Location | |
|---|---|---|---|---|---|---|
| Utsunomiya | 宇都宮 | - | 0.0 | Tohoku Shinkansen, Akita Shinkansen, Tohoku Main Line (Utsunomiya Line), Shōnan-Shinjuku Line | Utsunomiya | Tochigi |
| Tsuruta | 鶴田 | 4.8 | 4.8 | | Utsunomiya | Tochigi |
| Kanuma | 鹿沼 | 9.5 | 14.3 | | Kanuma | Tochigi |
| Fubasami | 文挟 | 8.1 | 22.4 | | Nikkō | Tochigi |
| Shimotsuke-Ōsawa | 下野大沢 | 5.8 | 28.2 | | Nikkō | Tochigi |
| Imaichi | 今市 | 5.7 | 33.9 | | Nikkō | Tochigi |
| Nikkō | 日光 | 6.6 | 40.5 | Tōbu Nikkō Line (Tōbu-Nikkō) | Nikkō | Tochigi |

== Rolling stock ==
- E131-600/-680 series 3-car EMUs (since 12 March 2022)
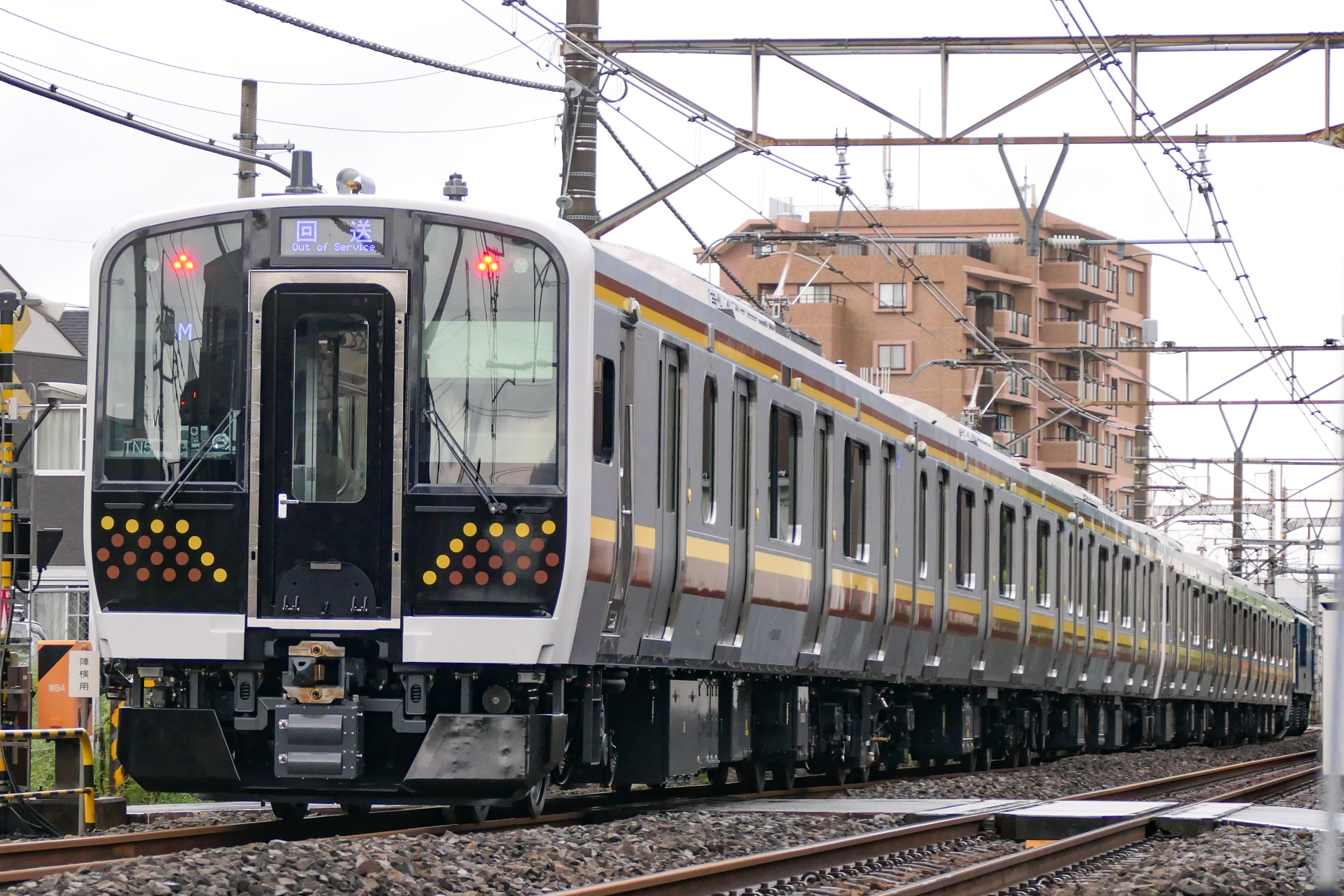
A E131-600 series EMU on delivery in September 2021.

=== Former rolling stock ===
- 107 series 2-car EMUs (until 15 March 2013)
- 205-600 series 4-car EMUs (x4) (from 16 March 2013 to 11 March 2022)
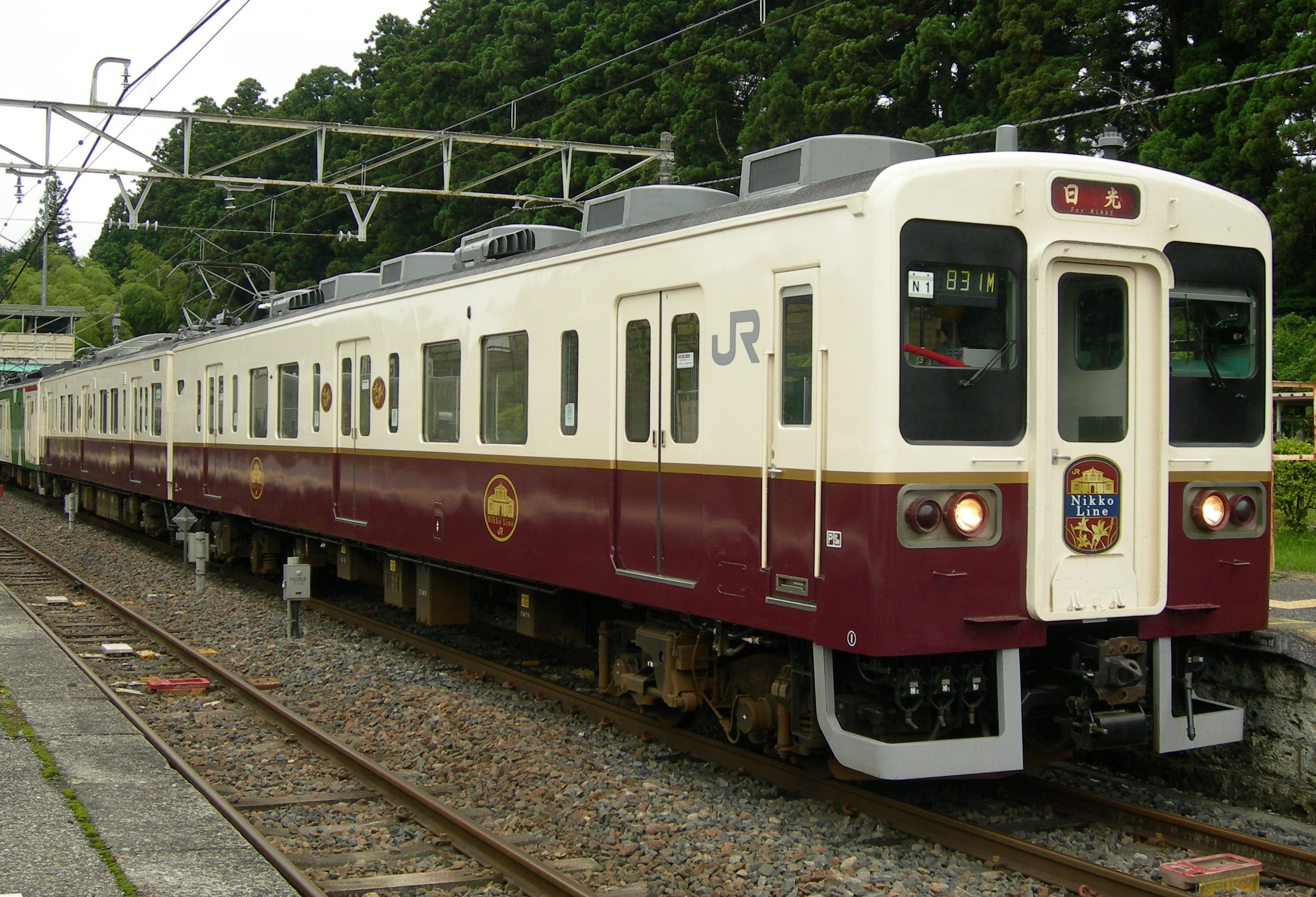
A 107 series EMU at Fubasami Station

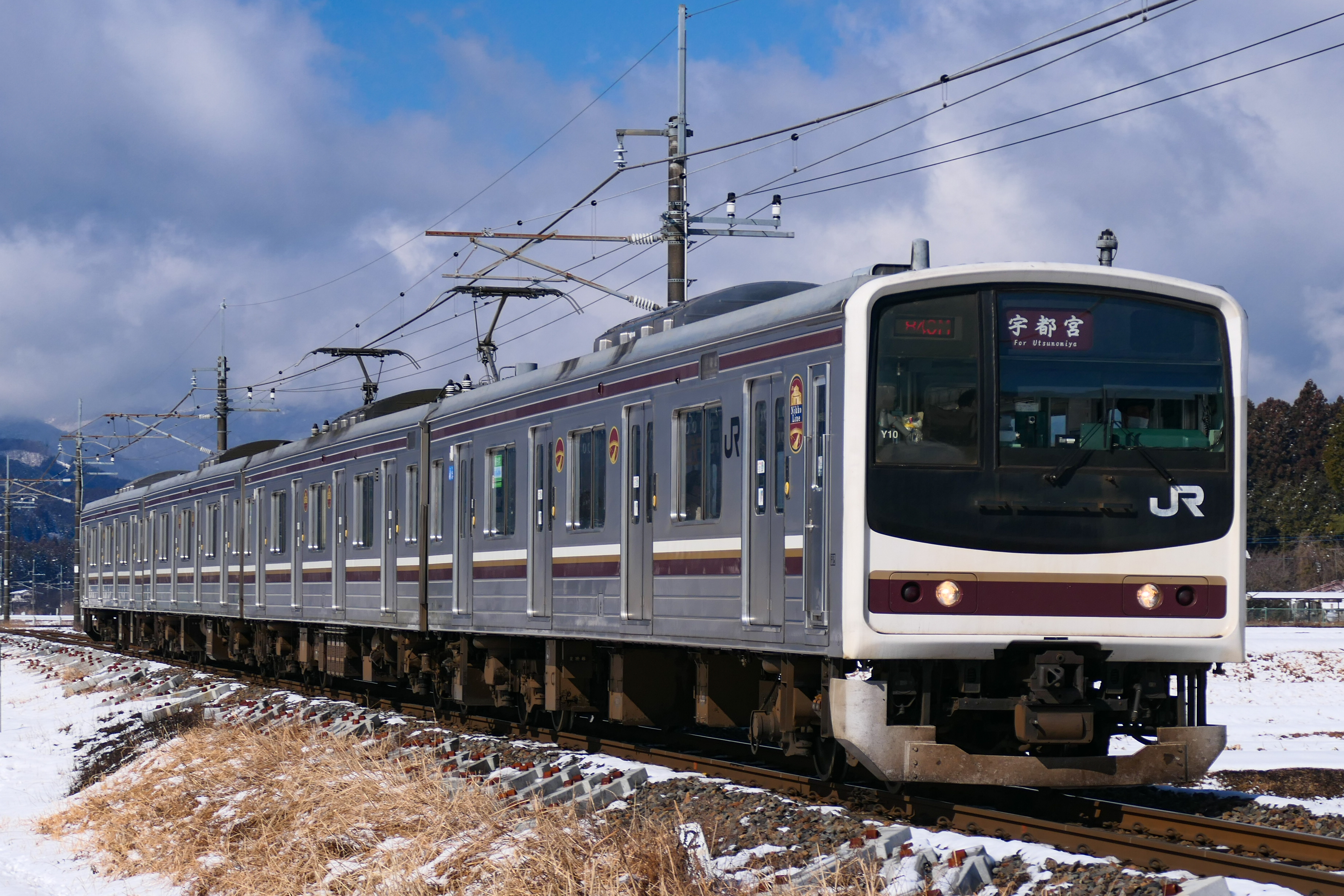
A Nikko Line 205–600 series set, February 2022

== History ==
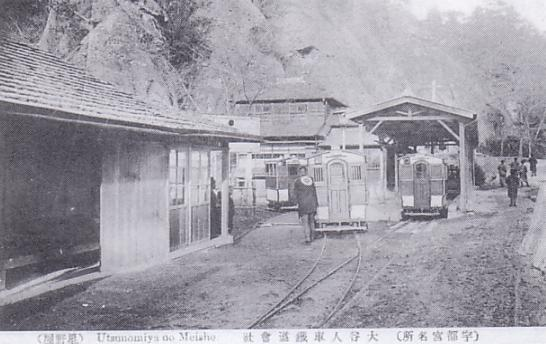
The handcar-operated Tochigi Prefectural Government line

The Nippon Railway Co. opened the line in 1890 and was nationalized in 1906. The line was electrified in 1959, and CTC signaling was commissioned in 1970. Freight services ceased in the year 1984.

=== Former connecting lines ===
- Tsuruta Station:

The Tochigi Prefectural Government opened a 3 km 2 ft (610 mm) gauge line to Nishihara-cho in 1897, extending it 10 km to Yoshihara in 1899 and opening a 4 km branch to Tokujiro the following year. Handcar passenger services commenced on both lines from opening, operating until 1928. A 7.5 km branch from Nishihara-cho to Tateiwa was opened in 1898 to haul gravel.

In 1931, the lines were purchased by the Tobu Railway Co. which closed all but the Tateiwa branch, which it converted to 1,067 mm (3 ft 6 in) gauge and built a connection to Nishi-Kawada station on the Tobu Utsunomiya Line. The Tateiwa branch ceased operation in 1961 following a landslide and was formally closed in 1964.

- Nikko Station:

The Nikko Electric Railway Co. opened an 8 km line electrified at 600 V DC to Iwanohana between 1907 and 1913, and extended it 2 km to Umakae (approximately 300 m higher than Nikko) in 1931 to connect to a 1.2 km funicular railway that climbed 428 m which opened in 1932. In 1944, electric locomotives began hauling copper ore on the line. Freight tonnage decreased 25% between 1964 and 1966, and passenger numbers decreased by 17% over the same period, resulting in the line closing in 1968. The funicular railway closed in 1970.
