= Utsunomiya Bunsei Junior College =

Coordinates: 36°35′56.7″N 139°51′31.5″E

- 宇都宮文星短期大学
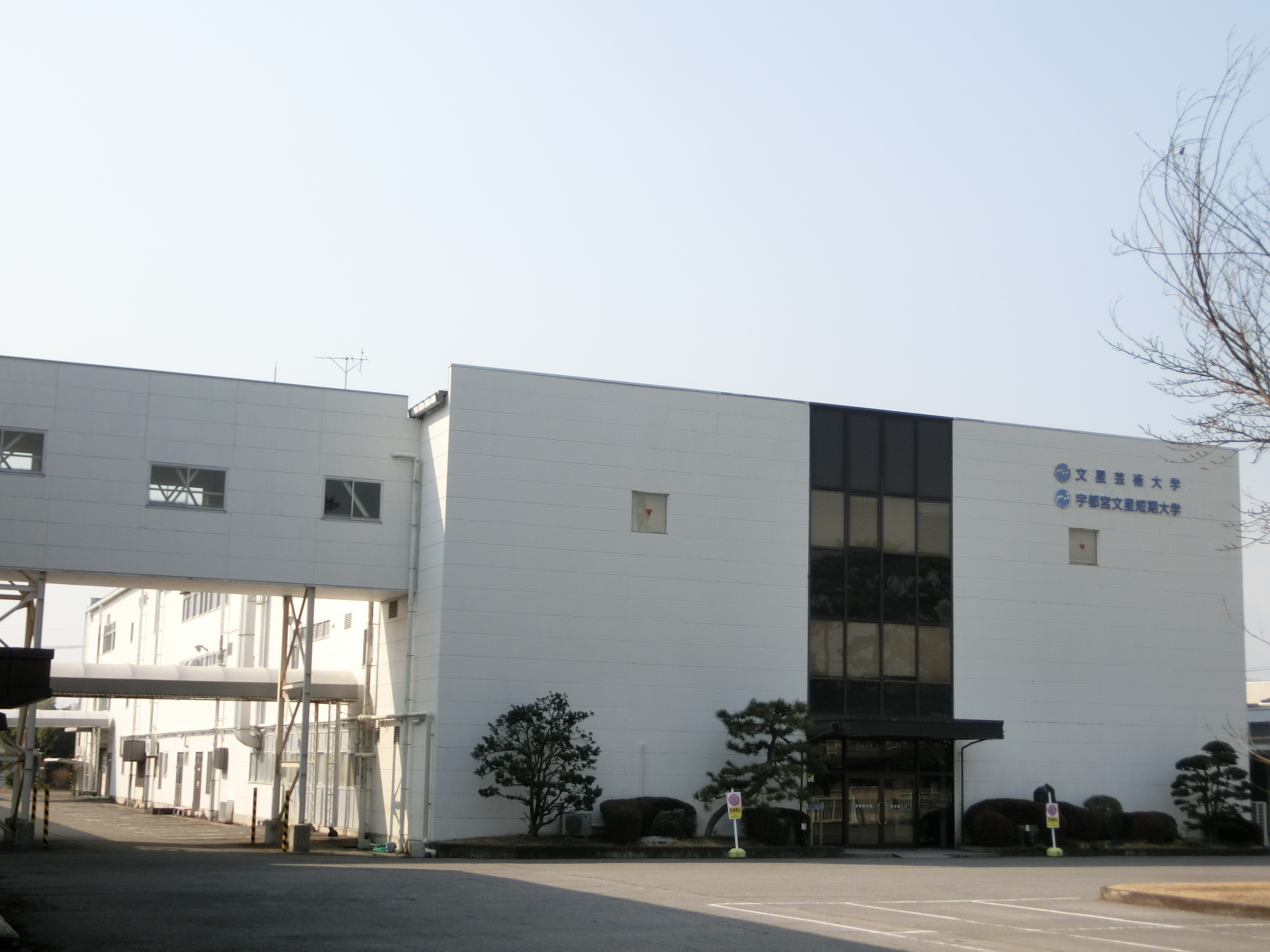
- Type: Private
- Active: 1989–2023
- Location: Utsunomiya, Tochigi, Japan
- Website: http://www.bunsei.ac.jp/UBJC/

Utsunomiya Bunsei Junior College (宇都宮文星短期大学, Utsunomiya bunsei tanki daigaku) was a private junior college in Utsunomiya, Tochigi, Japan, established in 1989. It was attached to the Bunsei University of Art. The college ceased operations in 2023 due to low enrollment.
