= Utsunomiya Kyowa University =

Coordinates: 36°33′38.7″N 139°49′43.6″E

- 宇都宮共和大学
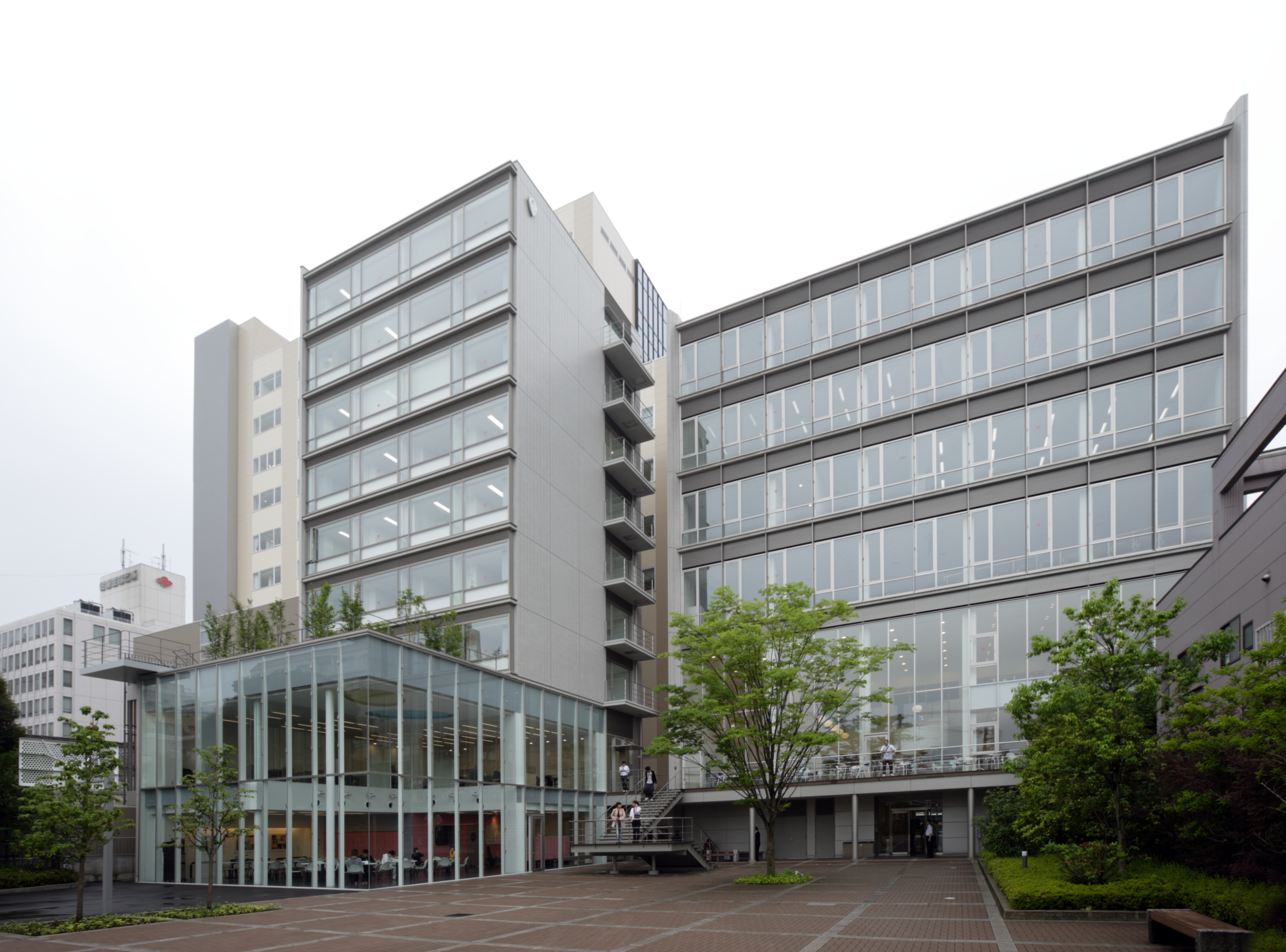
- Utsunomiya Kyowa University
- Type: Private
- Established: 1999
- Location: Nasushiobara, Tochigi, Japan
- Website: http://www.kyowa-u.ac.jp/

Utsunomiya Kyowa University (宇都宮共和大学, Utsunomiya kyōwa daigaku) is a private university in Nasushiobara, Tochigi, Japan, established in 1999. The present name was adopted in 2006. Utsunomiya Junior College is attached to this university. The college is currently closed. It has tennis courts, a gym, a baseball field, and a small cafe.
