= Bunsei University of Art =

Private university in Tochigi, Japan

Coordinates: 36°35′57.2″N 139°51′30.8″E

- 文星芸術大學
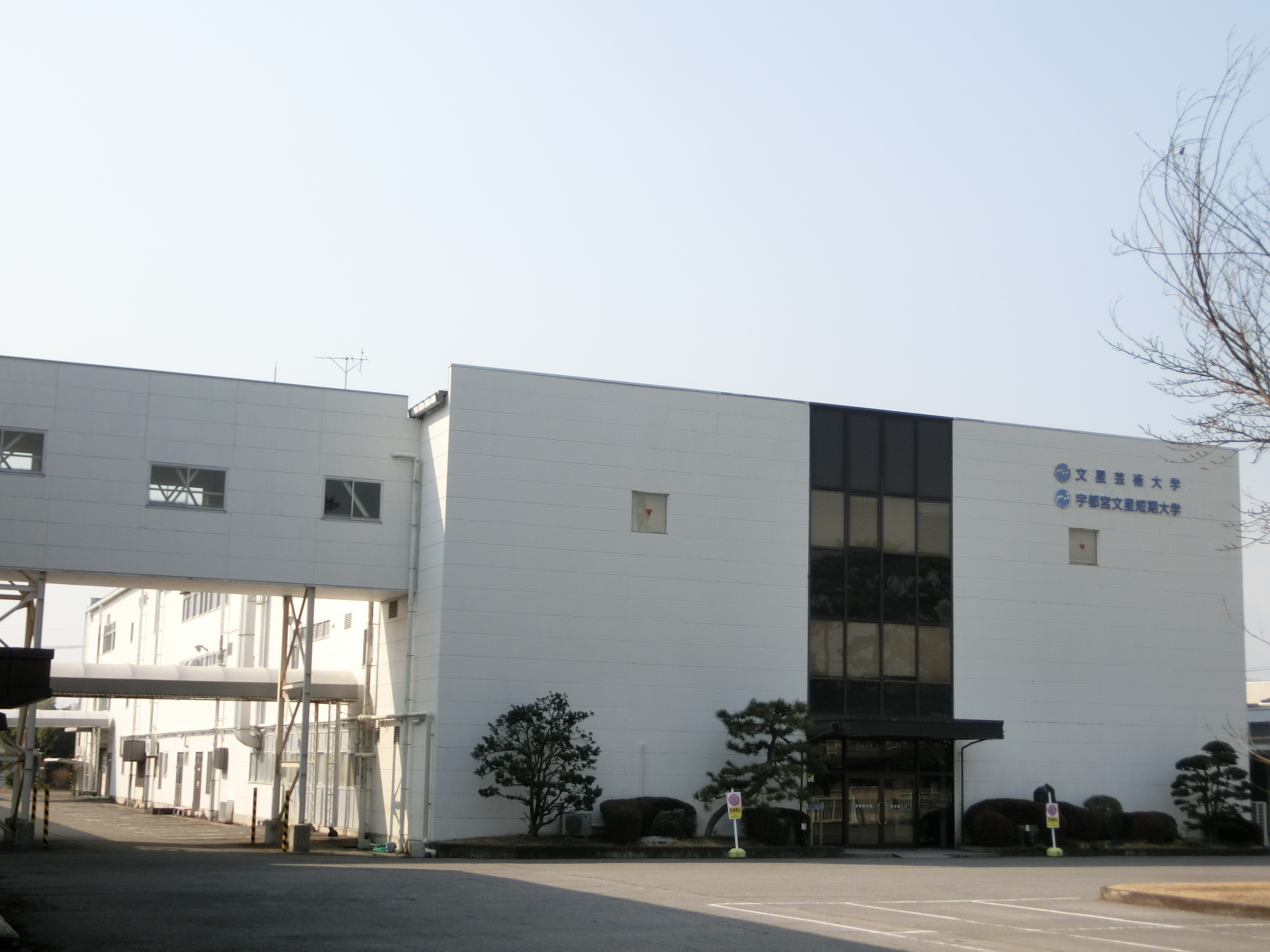
- Bunsei University of Art
- Type: Private
- Established: 1999
- Students: 368 (in 2013)
- Location: Utsunomiya, Tochigi, Japan
- Website: http://www.bunsei.ac.jp/

Bunsei University of Art (文星芸術大學, Bunsei geijutsu daigaku) is a private university in Utsunomiya, Tochigi, Japan, established in 1999. The university also has a graduate school. The university is affiliated with the Utsunomiya Bunsei Junior College and the Hidehumi Ueno Memorial Museum.
