= Utsunomiya University =

National university in Japan

- 宇都宮大学
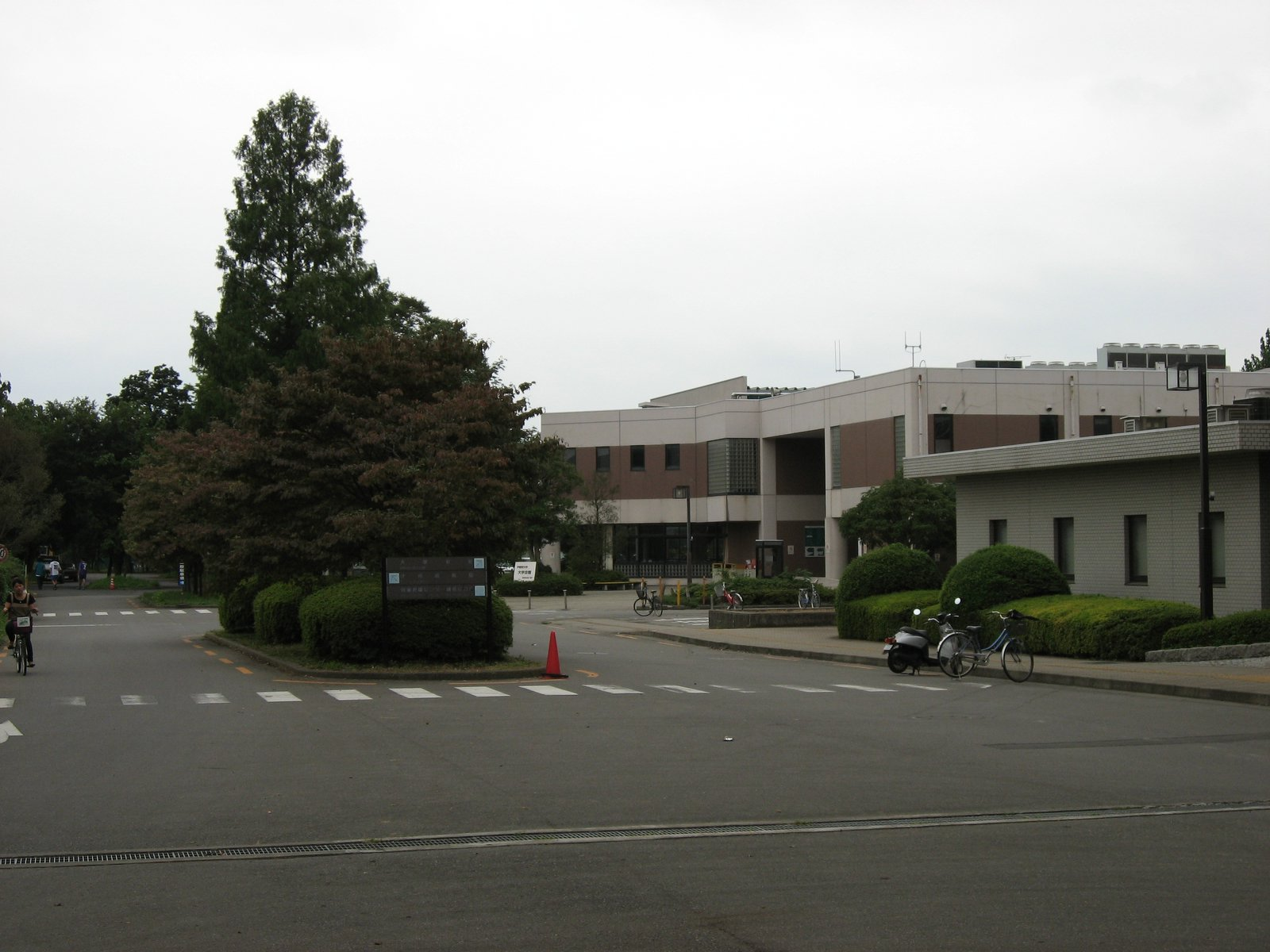
- Type: National
- Established: Founded 1922; Chartered 1949
- President: Osamu Ikeda
- Academic staff: 362 full-time
- Students: 4,922
- Undergraduates: 3,977
- Postgraduates: 945
- Doctoral students: 102
- Location: 350 Mine-cho, Utsunomiya, Tochigi 321-8505, Utsunomiya, Tochigi, Japan; 36°32′57″N 139°54′50″E
- Campus: Urban
- Mascot: "U-tan"
- Website: www.utsunomiya-u.ac.jp

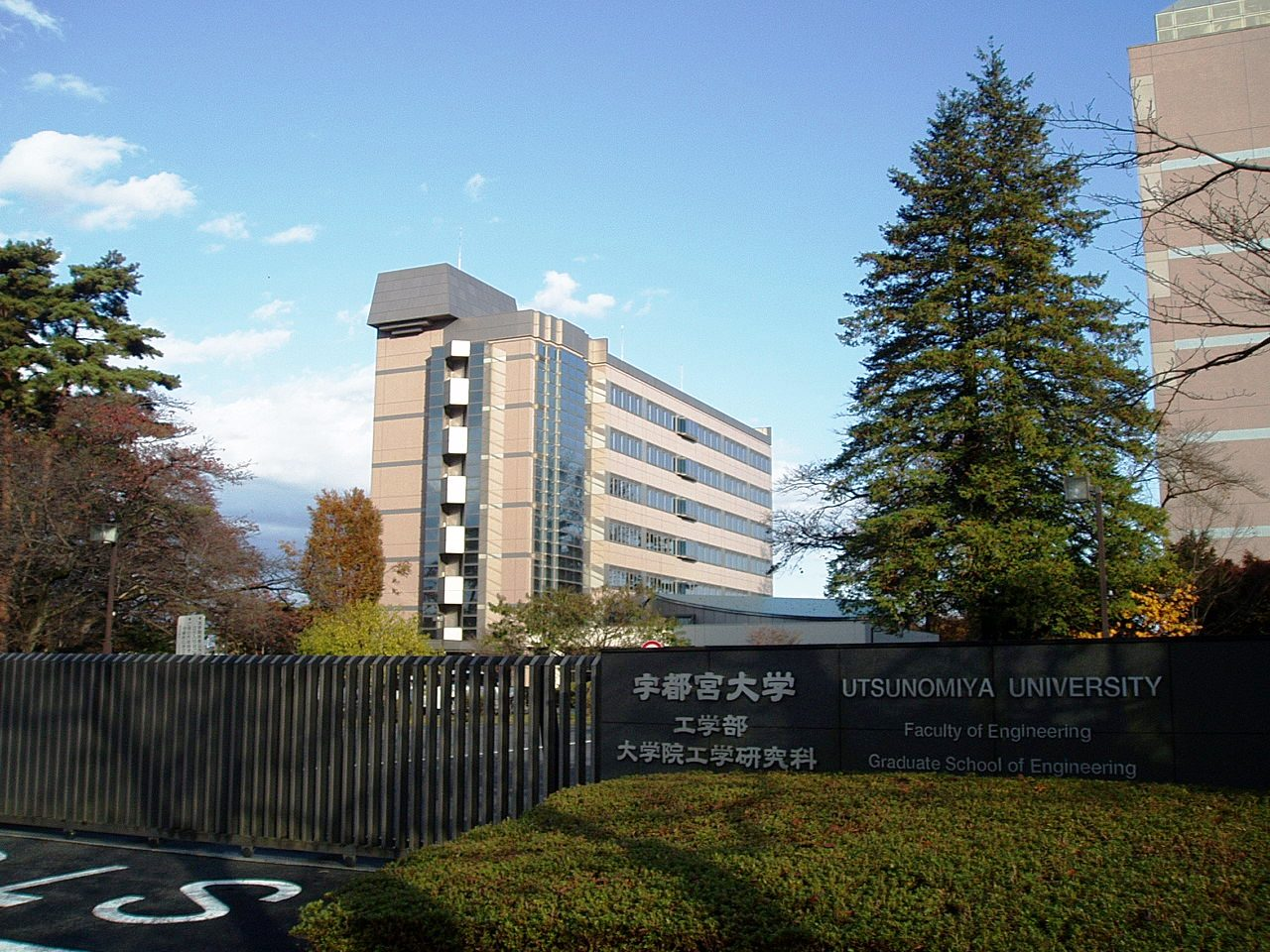
Yoto Campus (Engineering)

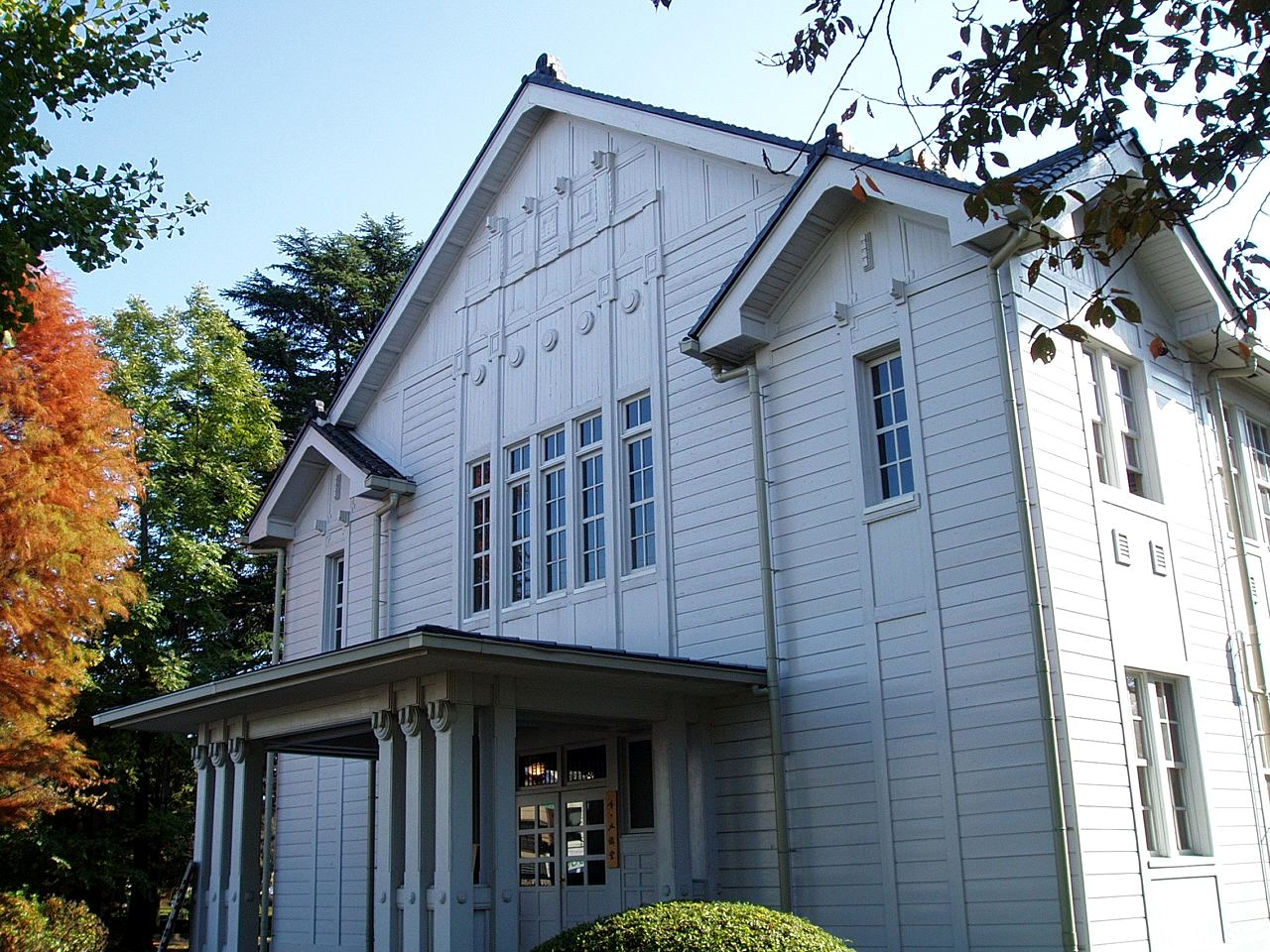
Minegaoka Auditorium, built in 1924

Utsunomiya University (宇都宮大学, Utsunomiya daigaku) is a national university in Japan. The main campus is located in Miné-machi, and the engineering campus at Yōtō, in Utsunomiya, Tochigi Prefecture.

== History ==
Utsunomiya University was established in 1949 by integrating three national colleges: Utsunomiya Agricultural and Forestry College (宇都宮農林専門学校, Utsunomiya nōrin semmon gakkō; founded in 1922), Tochigi Normal School (栃木師範学校, Tochigi shihan gakkō; founded in 1873) and Tochigi Normal School for Youth (栃木青年師範学校, Tochigi seinen shihan gakkō; founded in 1922).

The university at first had two faculties: Faculty of Agriculture (in Mine Campus) and Faculty of Liberal Arts (in Takaragi Campus).

- 1955: The Faculty of Liberal Arts was removed to Mine Campus.
- 1964: Utsunomiya Technical Junior College (宇都宮工業短期大学) was merged with the university to constitute Faculty of Engineering (in Yoto Campus).
- 1966: The Faculty of Liberal Arts was renamed Faculty of Education.
- 1994: The Faculty of International Studies was added.

== Faculties (Undergraduate Schools) ==
- Faculty of International Studies
  - Department of International Social Studies
  - Department of International Cultural Studies
- Faculty of Education
  - School Teachers' Training Course
  - Lifelong Education Course
  - Environmental Education Course
- Faculty of Engineering (in Yoto Campus)
  - Department of Mechanical Systems Engineering
  - Department of Electrical and Electronic Engineering
  - Department of Applied Chemistry
  - Department of Architecture and Civil Engineering
  - Department of Information Science
  - Department of Optical Engineering
- Faculty of Agriculture
  - Department of Bioproductive Science
  - Department of Environmental Engineering
  - Department of Agricultural Economics
  - Department of Forest Sciences

== Graduate Schools ==
- Graduate School of International Studies (Master's/Doctoral)
- Graduate School of Education (Master's courses only)
- Graduate School of Engineering (Master's/Doctoral)
- Graduate School of Agriculture (Master's/Doctoral)
  - The doctoral courses belong to the Joint Graduate School of Agriculture by Tokyo University of Agriculture and Technology, Ibaraki University and Utsunomiya University.
