= Sakushin Gakuin University =

Higher education institution in Tochigi Prefecture, Japan

Coordinates: 36°32′33.9″N 139°58′38.7″E

- 作新学院大学
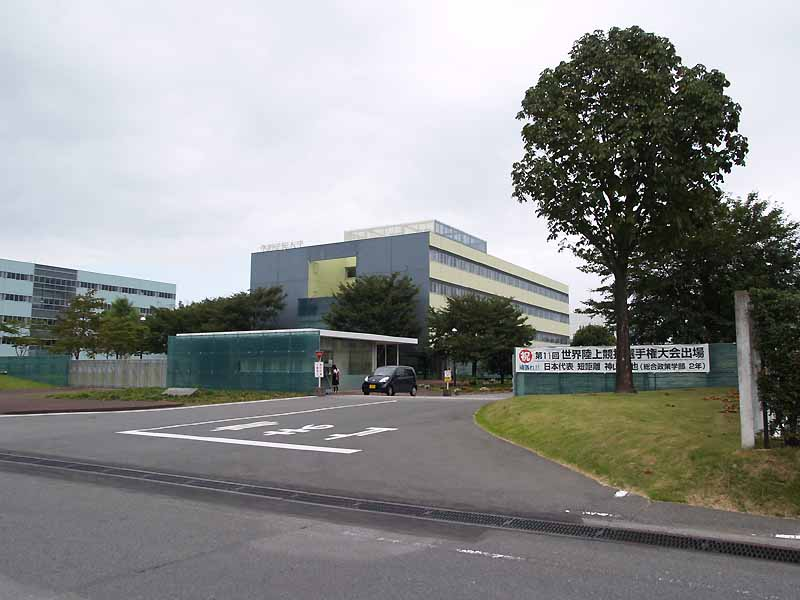
- Sakushin Gakuin University
- Type: Private
- Established: 1967 (women’s junior college); 1989 (coeducational university)
- Location: Utsunomiya, Tochigi, Japan
- Website: http://www.sakushin-u.ac.jp/

Sakushin Gakuin University (作新学院大学, Sakushin gakuin daigaku) is a private university in Utsunomiya, Tochigi, Japan, established in 1989. The predecessor of the school, a women's junior college, was founded in 1967.
