= Utsunomiya Junior College =

Private junior college in Japan

Coordinates: 36°33′38.7″N 139°49′43.6″E

- 宇都宮短期大学
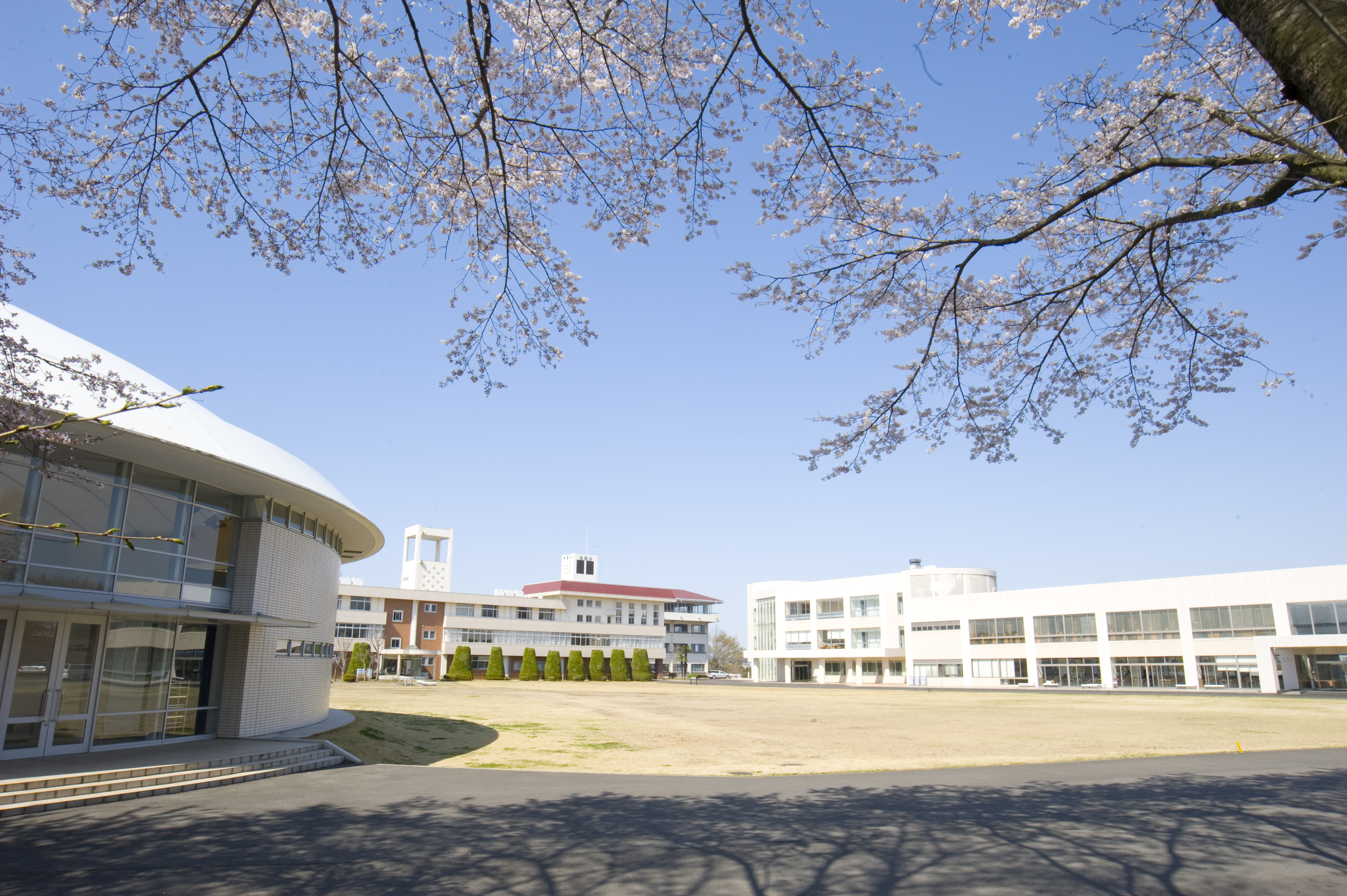
- Utsunomiya Junior College
- Type: Private
- Established: 1967
- Location: Utsunomiya, Tochigi, Japan
- Website: http://www.ujc.ac.jp

Utsunomiya Junior College (宇都宮短期大学, Utsunomiya tanki daigaku) is a private junior college in Utsunomiya, Tochigi, Japan, established in 1967. It is attached to Utsunomiya Kyowa University.
