= Imaichi Station =

Railway station in Nikkō, Tochigi Prefecture, Japan

Imaichi Station 今市駅
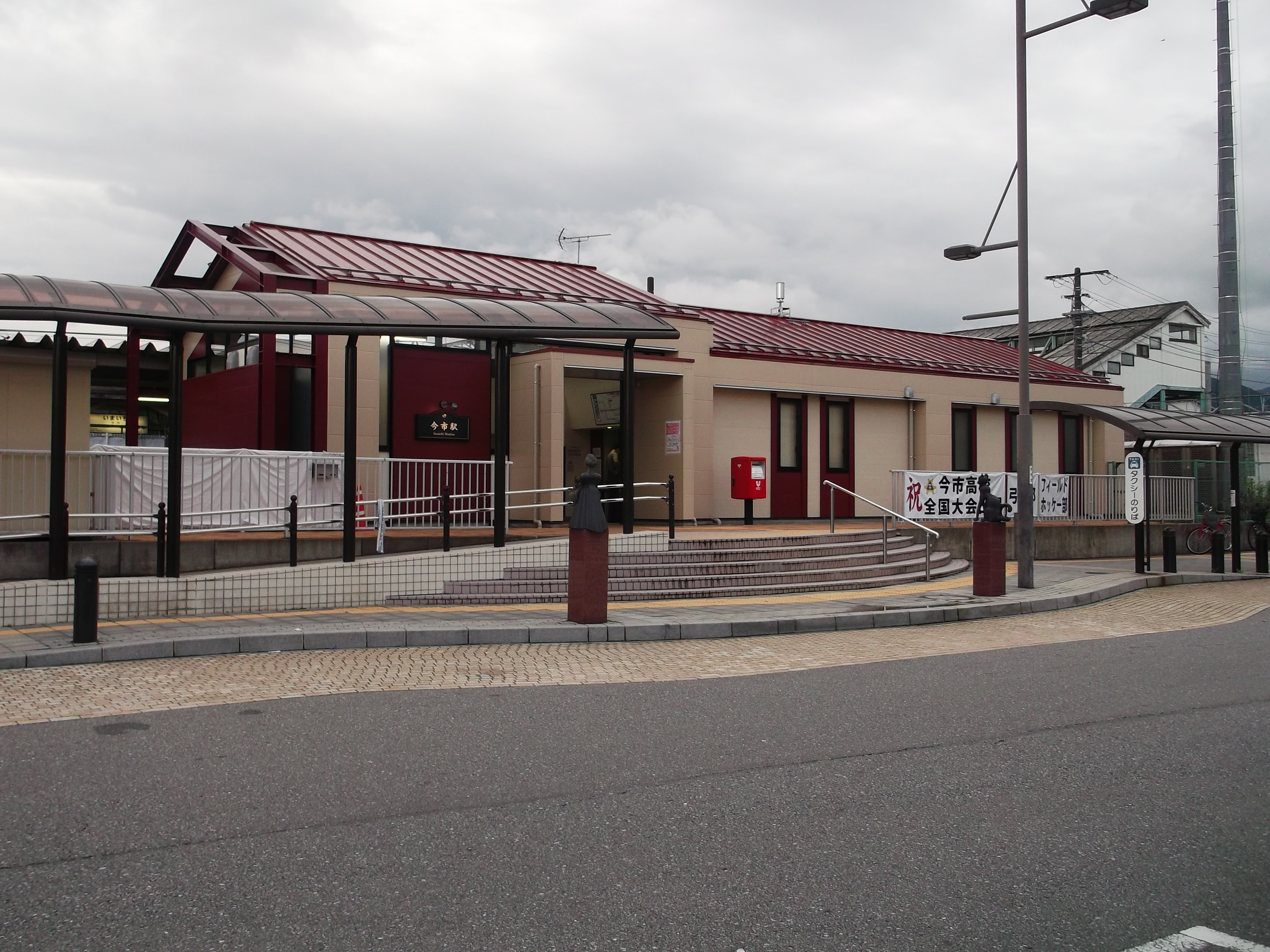
- Imaichi Station in July 2014

General information
- Location: Hiragasaki, Nikkō-shi, Tochigi-ken 321-1262; Japan
- Coordinates: 36.7214°N 139.6871°E
- Operator: JR East
- Line: ■ Nikkō Line
- Distance: 33.9 km from Utsunomiya
- Platforms: 1 island platforms
- Tracks: 2

Other information
- Status: Staffed
- Website: Official website

History
- Opened: 1 June 1890

Passengers
- FY2019: 1170

Services
Preceding station	JR East	Following station
Nikkō Terminus	Nikkō Line	Shimotsuke-Ōsawa towards Utsunomiya
Location
- Location within Tochigi Prefecture Location within Japan

Imaichi Station (今市駅, Imaichi-eki) is a railway station in the city of Nikkō, Tochigi, Japan, operated by the East Japan Railway Company (JR East).

== Lines ==
Imaichi Station is served by the Nikkō Line, and is located 33.9 kilometers from the starting point of the line at Utsunomiya.

== Station layout ==
The station consists of an island platform serving two tracks, connected to the station building by a footbridge. The station is staffed.

=== Platforms ===
1	■ Nikkō Line	for Utsunomiya; Nikkō
2	■ Nikkō Line	for Nikkō (infrequently used)

== History ==
Imaichi Station opened on 1 June 1890. On 1 April 1987, the station came under the control of JR East with the privatization of the Japanese National Railways (JNR). A new station building was completed in 2013.

== Passenger statistics ==
In fiscal 2019, the station was used by an average of 1170 passengers daily (boarding passengers only).

== Surrounding area ==
- Former Imaichi city hall
- Imaichi Post Office
- National Route 119
- National Route 121

== See also ==
- List of railway stations in Japan
