= Nikkō Station =

Railway station in Nikkō, Tochigi Prefecture, Japan

Nikkō Station 日光駅
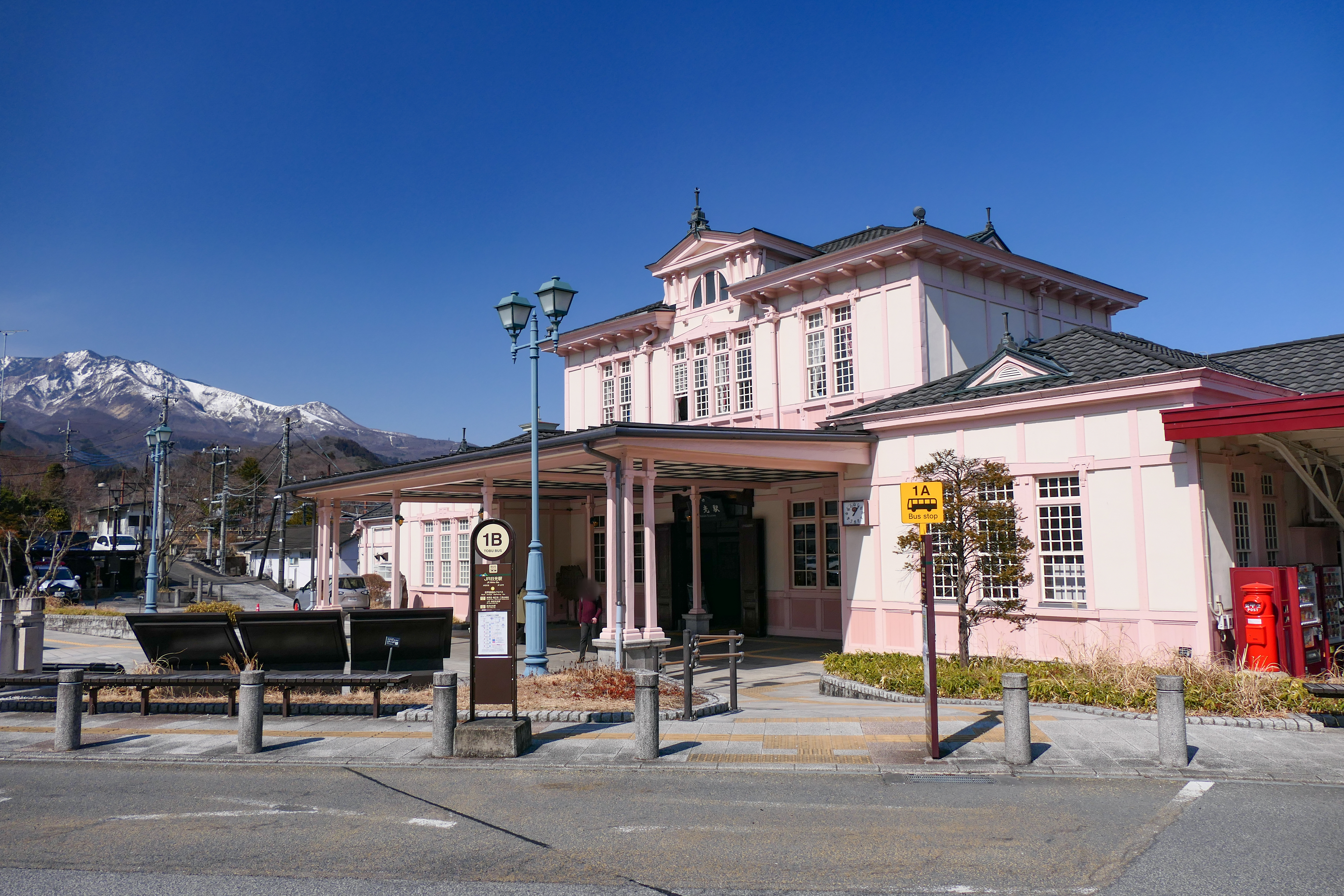
- Nikkō Station in March 2022

General information
- Location: Aioi-chō, Nikkō-shi, Tochigi-ken 321-1413; Japan
- Coordinates: 36.7471805°N 139.622122°E
- Operator: JR East
- Line: ■ Nikkō Line
- Distance: 40.5 km from Utsunomiya
- Platforms: 2 side platforms
- Tracks: 2
- Connections: Bus stop

Other information
- Status: Staffed (Midori no Madoguchi )
- Website: Official website

History
- Opened: 1 August 1890

Passengers
- FY2019: 1046 daily

Services
| Preceding station | JR East | Following station |
|---|---|---|
| Terminus | Nikkō Line | Imaichi towards Utsunomiya |
Location
- Location within Tochigi Prefecture Location within Japan

Nikkō Station (日光駅, Nikkō-eki) is a railway station in the city of Nikkō, Tochigi, Japan, operated by the East Japan Railway Company (JR East).

== Lines ==
Nikkō Station forms the terminus of the Nikkō Line, and is located 40.5 kilometers from the opposing terminus of the line at Utsunomiya.

== Station layout ==
The station consists of two opposed side platforms, connected to the station building by a footbridge. The station has a Midori no Madoguchi staffed ticket office.

=== Platforms ===
| 1-2 | ■ Nikkō Line | for Imaichi and Utsunomiya |

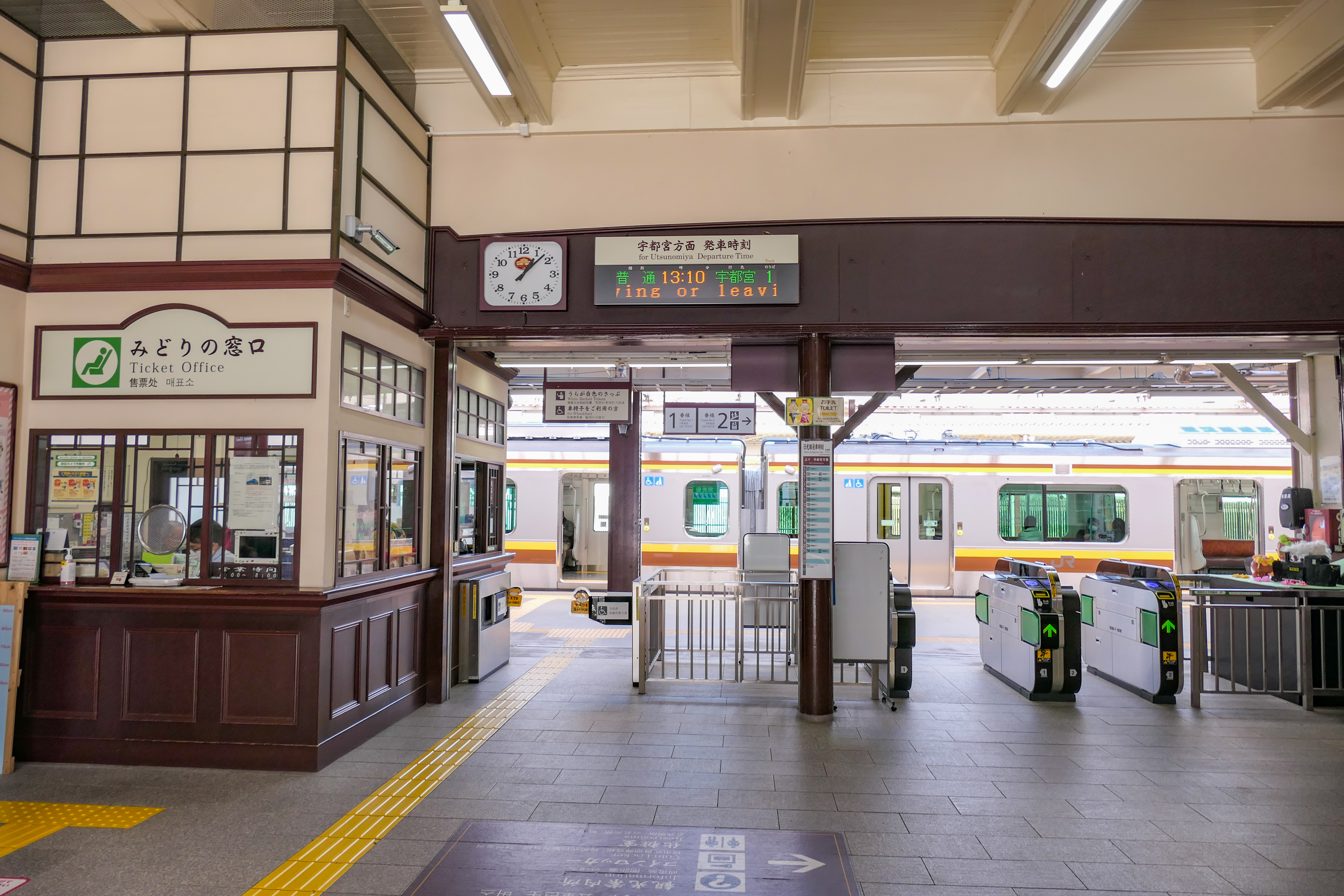
Ticket gate

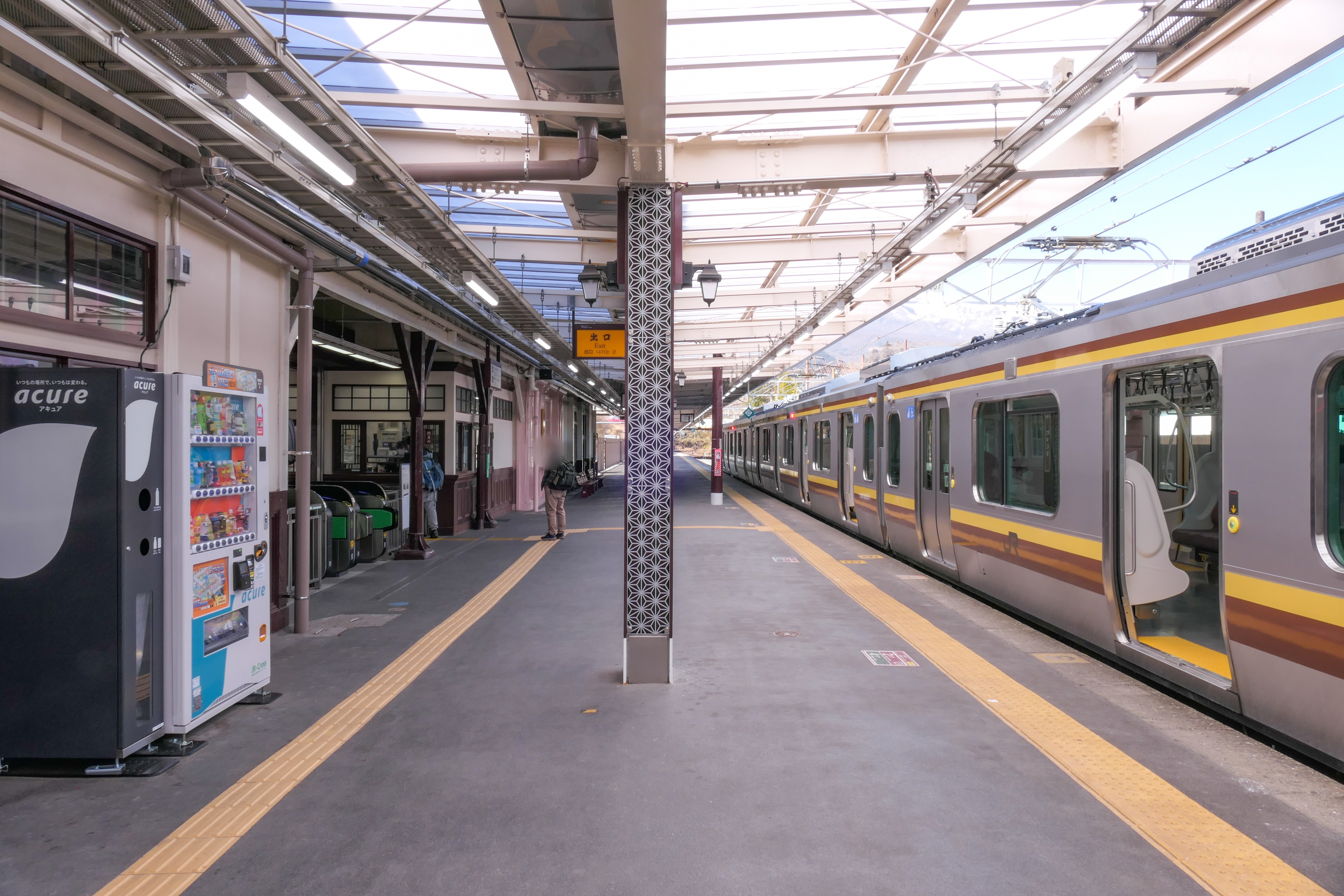
platform

== History ==
Nikkō Station opened on 1 August 1890. With the privatization of Japanese National Railways (JNR) on 1 April 1987, the station came under the control of JR East.

== Passenger statistics ==
In fiscal 2019, the station was used by an average of 1046 passengers daily (boarding passengers only).

== Bus service ==
=== In front of Nikko Station Bus stop ===
==== Route Buses ====
| No | Via | Destination | Company | Note |
|---|---|---|---|---|
| | Tobu-Nikko Station・Chūzenji Onsen Station (Lake Chūzenji) | Yumoto Onsen | ■Tobu Bus Nikko | |
| | Tobu-Nikko Station・Chūzenji Onsen Station・Kotoku Onsen (Nikko Astraea Hotel) | Yumoto Onsen | ■Tobu Bus Nikko | |
| | Tobu-Nikko Station・Hotel Seikoen mae ー shōdō-shōnin zō mae ー Omote-sando ー Nishi-sando ー Jinja-mae（Rinnō-ji・Nikkō Tōshōgū・Futarasan-jinja・Tobu Nikko(circular route)） | Nikko Station | ■Tobu Bus Nikko | |
| | Tobu-Nikko Station・Nishi-Sando(Nikkō Tōshōgū)・Tamozawa Goyōtei | Okuhosoo | ■Tobu Bus Nikko | |
| | Tobu-Nikko Station・Nikkō Tōshōgū・Tamozawa Goyōtei・Yashio no yu(there is in the case of passing) | Kiyotaki | ■Tobu Bus Nikko | |
| | Tobu-Nikko Station・Nishi-Sando(Nikkō Tōshōgū)・Tamozawa Goyōtei・Akechidaira | Chūzenji Onsen | ■Tobu Bus Nikko | |
| | Tobu-Nikko Station・Kirifuri Kōgen | Ōsasa Bokujō | ■Tobu Bus Nikko | Runs only during Summer |
| | Tobu-Nikko Station | Nikko Kirifuri Skate Center | ■Tobu Bus Nikko | Runs only during winter |
| | Tobu-Nikko Station | Kinugawaonsen Station | ■Tobu Bus Nikko | Runs only when there is service of SL Taiju on holiday |
| | Matō Station・Ashio Station・Tsūdō Station(Ashio Copper Mine) | Sōai Hospital | Nikko Shiei Bus | |
| | | Shimo-Imaichi Station | Nikko Shiei Bus | |

=== Nikko Station Bus stop ===
The bus stop is located on Japan National Route 119 between Nikko Station and Tobu-Nikko Station.

==== Route bus ====
| Bus stop | No | Via | Destination | Company |
|---|---|---|---|---|
| Kanto Jidosya | | | Nikkō Tōshōgū | Kanto Jidōsha |
| Kanto Jidosya | | | Utsunomiya Station | Kanto Jidōsha |

=== Highway Bus ===
| Bus stop | No | Via | Destination | Company |
|---|---|---|---|---|
| Highway bus | Marronnier | Non stop | Narita Airport | Kanto Jidōsya and Chiba Kōtsū |

== Surrounding area ==
- Tōbu Nikkō Station on the Tobu Nikko Line
- Nikkō City Hall
- Nikkō Post Office
- National Route 119

== See also ==
- List of railway stations in Japan
