= Yasuzuka Station =

Railway station in Mibu, Tochigi Prefecture, Japan

Coordinates: 36.4859°N 139.8355°E

TN36 Yasuzuka Station 安塚駅
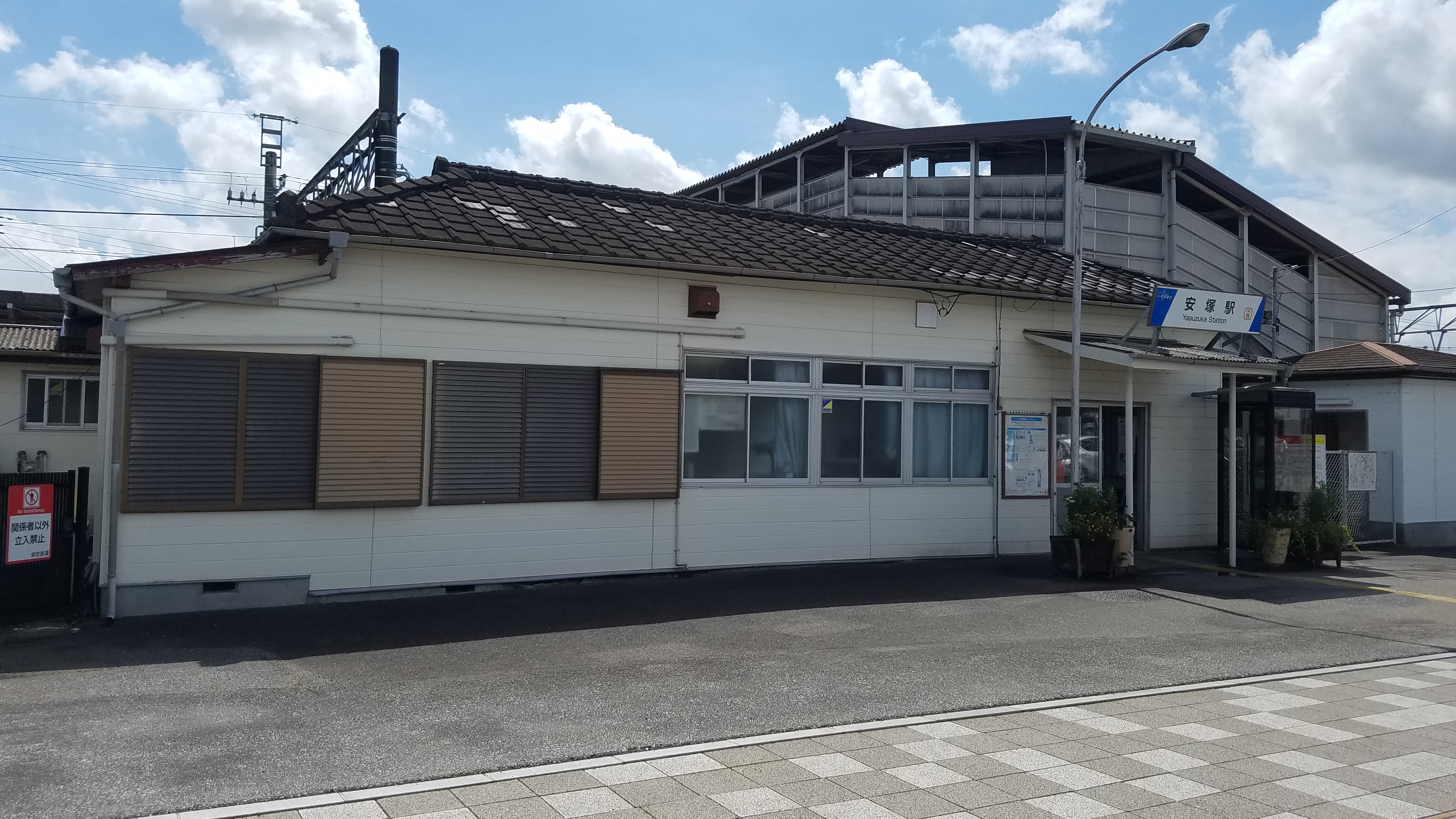
- Yasuzuka Station in August 2021

General information
- Location: 1053 Yasuzuka, Mibu, Shimotsuga, Tochigi （栃木県下都賀郡壬生町大字安塚1053） Japan
- Operator: Tobu Railway
- Line: Tobu Utsunomiya Line

Other information
- Station code: TN-36

History
- Opened: 1931

Passengers
- FY2014: 1233 daily

Services
Preceding station	Tobu Railway	Following station
Omocha-no-Machi TN35 towards Shin-Tochigi	Utsunomiya Line	Nishi-Kawada TN37 towards Tōbu-Utsunomiya
Location

Yasuzuka Station (安塚駅, Yasuzuka-eki) is a railway station on the Tobu Utsunomiya Line in Mibu, Tochigi, Japan, operated by the private railway operator Tobu Railway. The station is numbered "TN-36".

== Lines ==
Yasuzuka Station is served by the Tobu Utsunomiya Line, and is 14.8 km from the starting point of the line at Shin-Tochigi.

== Station layout ==
The station consists of two opposed side platforms connected to the station building by an overhead passageway.

=== Platforms ===
1	■ Tobu Utsunomiya Line	for Tōbu Utsunomiya
2	■ Tobu Utsunomiya Line	for Tochigi

== History ==
Yasuzuka Station opened on 11 August 1931. From 17 March 2012, station numbering was introduced on all Tobu lines, with Yasuzuka Station becoming "TN-36".

== Surrounding area ==
- former Minamiinukai Town Hall
- Minamiinukai Post Office

== See also ==
- List of railway stations in Japan
