= Kuniya Station =

Railway station in Mibu, Tochigi Prefecture, Japan

Coordinates: 36.4513°N 139.8240°E

TN34 Kuniya Station 国谷駅
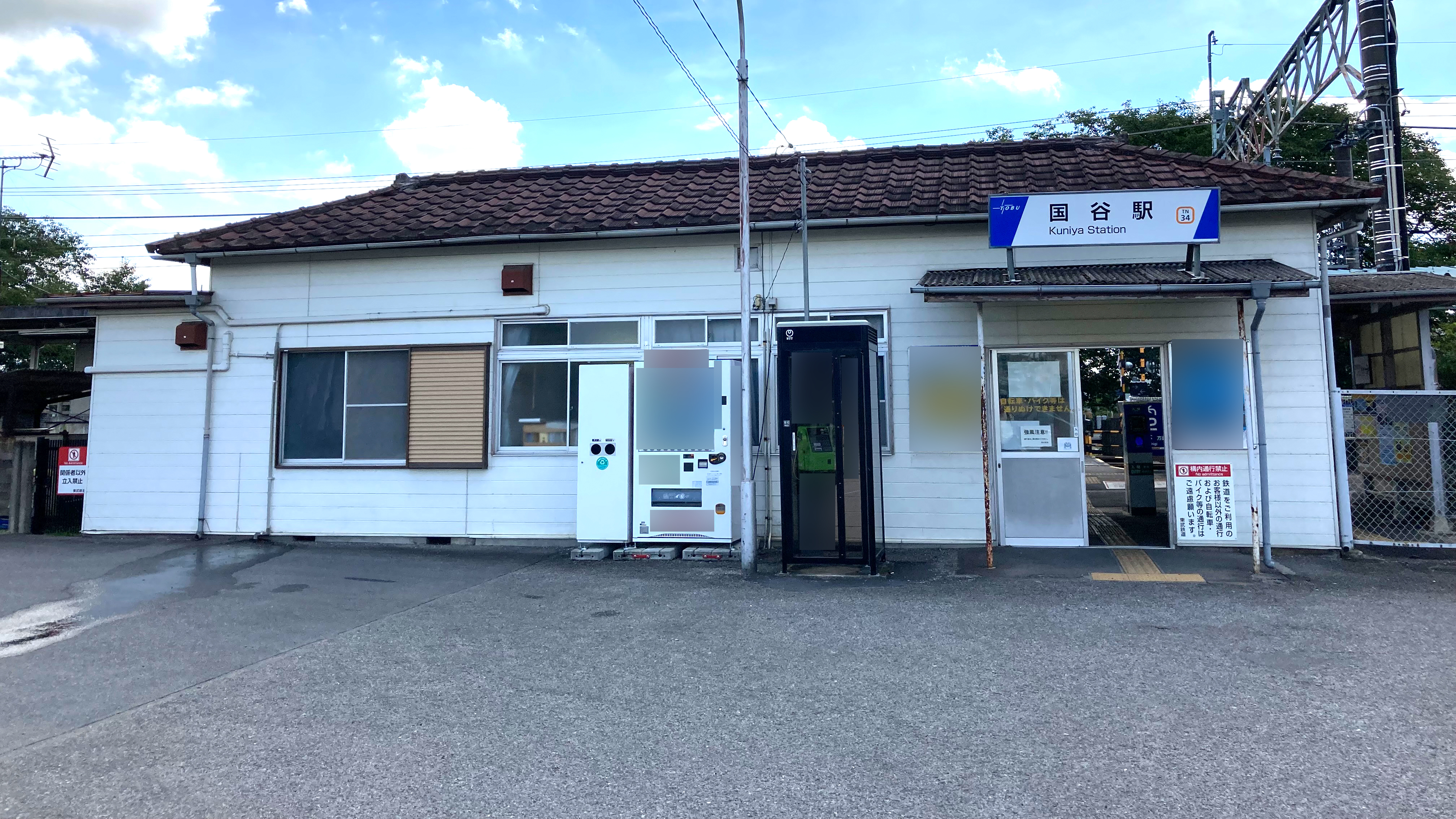
- Kuniya Station in August 2021

General information
- Location: Mibu, Mibu, Shimotsuga, Tochigi （栃木県下都賀郡壬生町大字壬生甲） Japan
- Operator: Tobu Railway
- Line: Tobu Utsunomiya Line

Other information
- Station code: TN-34

History
- Opened: 1931

Passengers
- FY2011: 972 daily

Services
| Preceding station | Tobu Railway | Following station |
|---|---|---|
| Mibu TN33 towards Shin-Tochigi | Utsunomiya Line | Omocha-no-Machi TN35 towards Tōbu-Utsunomiya |
Location

Kuniya Station (国谷駅, Kuniya-eki) is a railway station on the Tobu Utsunomiya Line in Mibu, Tochigi, Japan, operated by the private railway operator Tobu Railway. The station is numbered "TN-34".

== Lines ==
Kuniya Station is served by the Tobu Utsunomiya Line, and is 10.8 km from the starting point of the line at Shin-Tochigi.

== Station layout ==
The station consists of two opposed side platforms connected to the station building by a level crossing.

=== Platforms ===
| 1 | ■ Tobu Utsunomiya Line | for Tōbu Utsunomiya |
| 2 | ■ Tobu Utsunomiya Line | for Tochigi |

== History ==
Kuniya Station opened on 11 August 1931. From 17 March 2012, station numbering was introduced on all Tobu lines, with Kuniya Station becoming "TN-34".

== Surrounding area ==
- Mibu Toy Museum
- Mibu Post Office

== See also ==
- List of railway stations in Japan
