= Esojima Station =

Railway station in Utsunomiya, Tochigi Prefecture, Japan

TN38 Esojima Station 江曽島駅
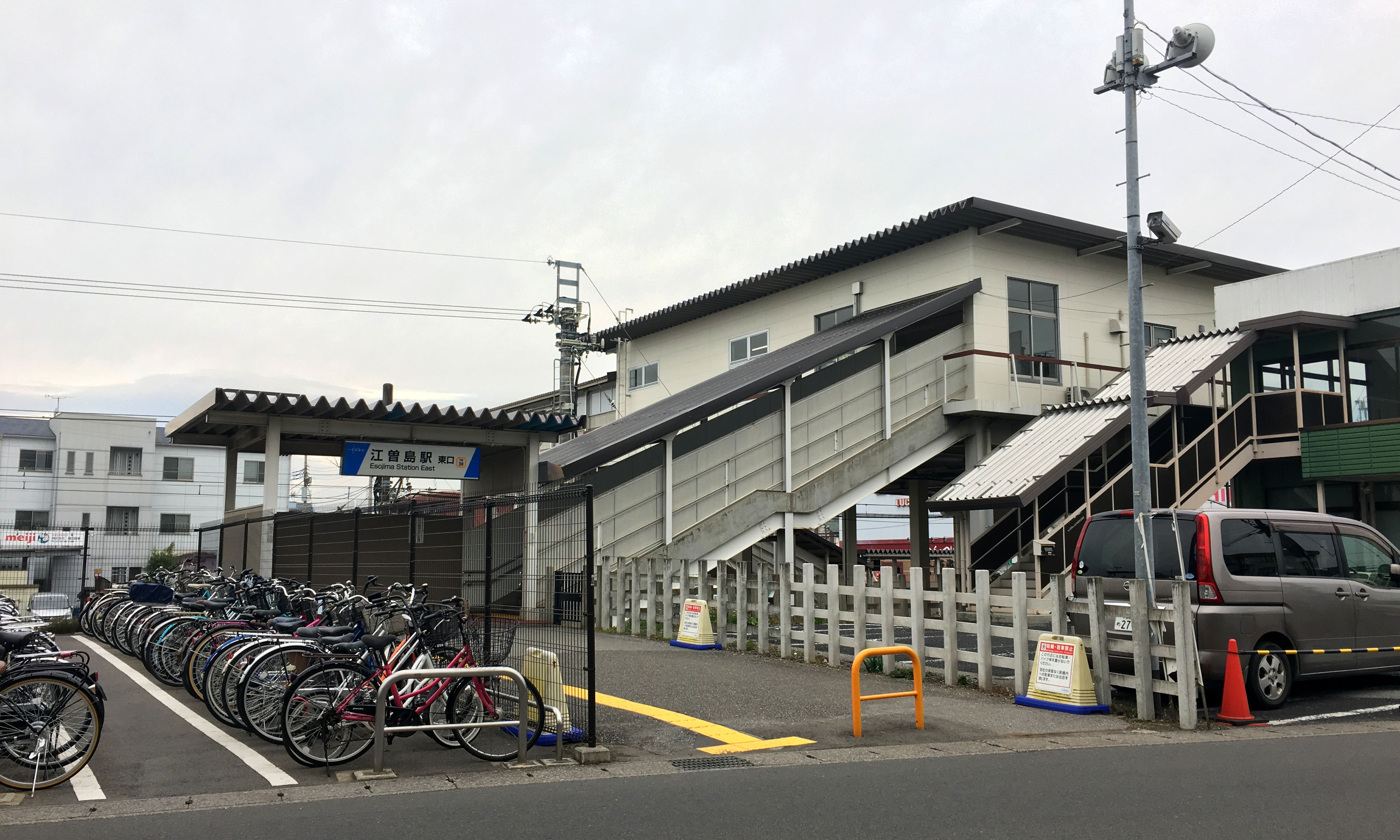
- Esojima Station east exit in November 2017

General information
- Location: 2-12-31 Yamato, Utsunomiya-shi, Tochigi-ken 321-0162; Japan
- Coordinates: 36.5312°N 139.8606°E
- Operator: Tobu Railway
- Line: ■ Tobu Utsunomiya Line
- Platforms: 1 island platform

Other information
- Station code: TN-38
- Website: Official website

History
- Opened: 1 July 1944

Passengers
- FY2019: 2102 daily

Services
Preceding station	Tobu Railway	Following station
Nishi-Kawada TN37 towards Shin-Tochigi	Utsunomiya Line	Minami-Utsunomiya TN39 towards Tōbu-Utsunomiya
Location
- Location within Tochigi Prefecture Location within Japan

Esojima Station (江曽島駅, Esojima-eki) is a railway station in the city of Utsunomiya, Tochigi, Japan, operated by the private railway operator Tobu Railway. The station is numbered "TN-38".

== Lines ==
Esojima Station is served by the Tobu Utsunomiya Line, and is 20.3 km from the starting point of the line at Shin-Tochigi.

== Station layout ==
The station consists of one island platform with an elevated station building located above the tracks.

=== Platforms ===
1	■ Tobu Utsunomiya Line	for Tōbu Utsunomiya
2	■ Tobu Utsunomiya Line	for Tochigi

== History ==
Esojima Station opened on 1 July 1944. From 17 March 2012, station numbering was introduced on all Tobu lines, with Esojima Station becoming "TN-39".

== Passenger statistics ==
In fiscal 2019, the station was used by an average of 2102 passengers daily (boarding passengers only).

== Surrounding area ==
- Utsunomiya Hospital

== See also ==
- List of railway stations in Japan
