= Yashū-Ōtsuka Station =

Railway station in Tochigi, Tochigi Prefecture, Japan

TN32 Yashū-Ōtsuka Station 野州大塚駅
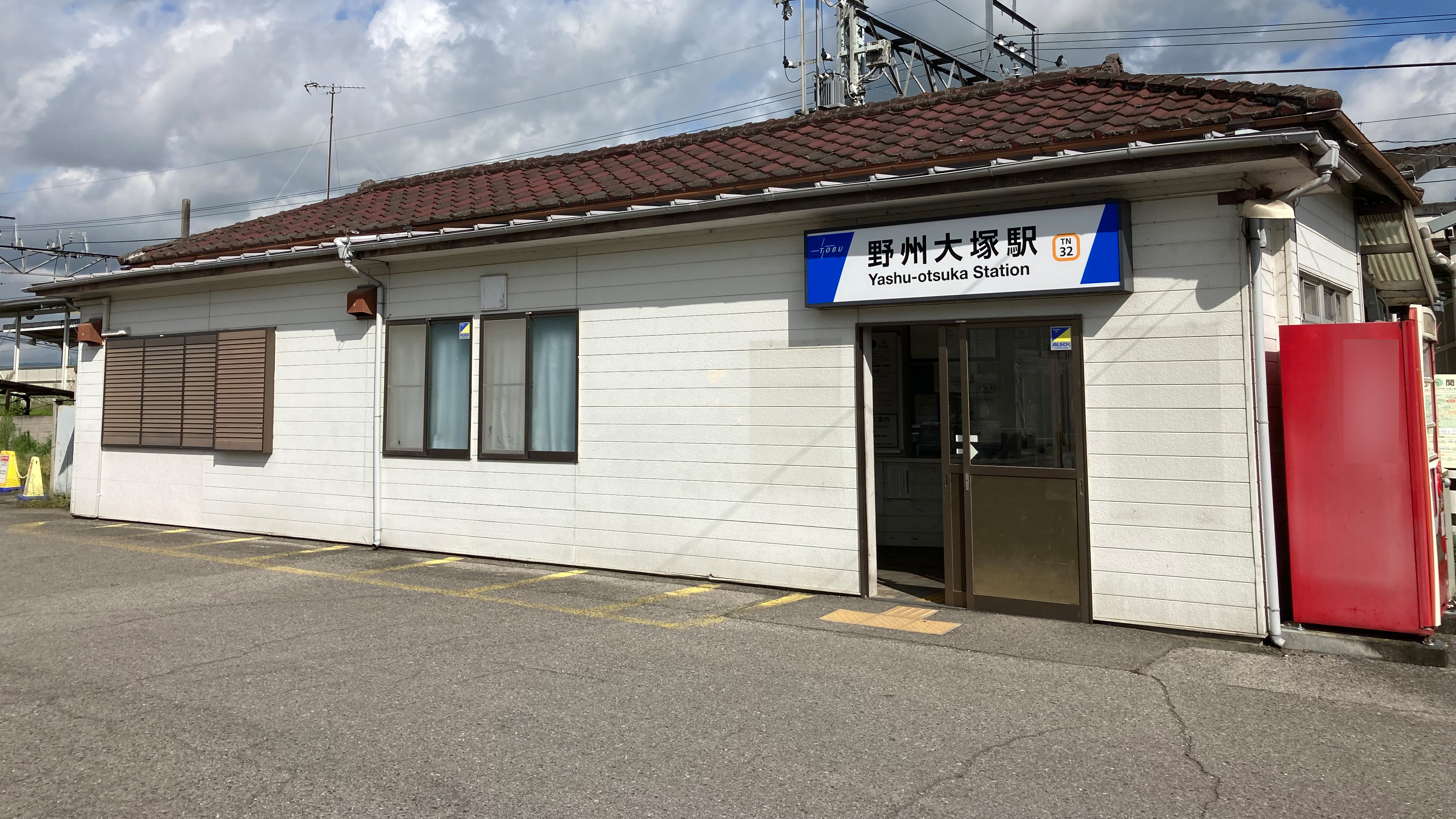
- Yashū-Ōtsuka Station in August 2021

General information
- Location: 1258-10 Ōtsuka-machi, Tochigi-shi, Tochigi-ken, 328-0007; Japan
- Coordinates: 36.4086°N 139.7724°E
- Operator: Tobu Railway
- Line: ■ Tobu Utsunomiya Line
- Platforms: 1 side platforms

Other information
- Station code: TN-32
- Website: Official website

History
- Opened: 1 November 1931

Passengers
- FY2019: 513 daily

Services
Preceding station	Tobu Railway	Following station
Yashū-Hirakawa TN31 towards Shin-Tochigi	Utsunomiya Line	Mibu TN33 towards Tōbu-Utsunomiya
Location
- Location within Tochigi Prefecture Location within Japan

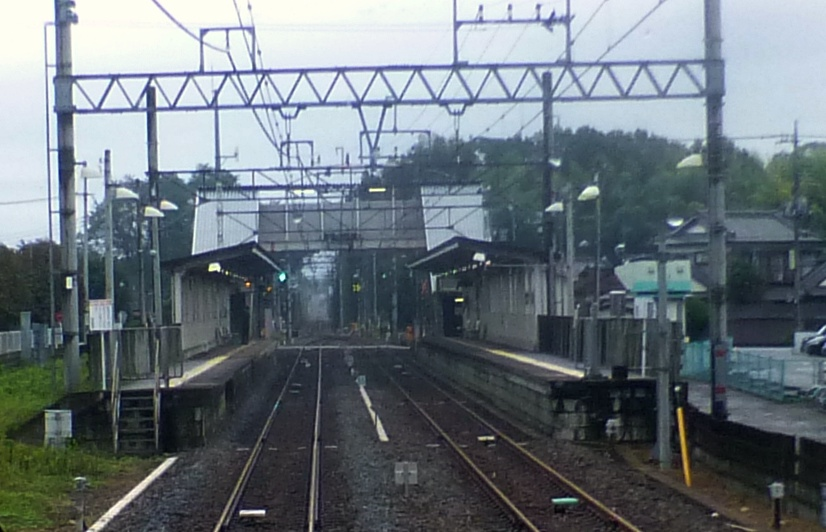
Platforms, 2016

Yashū-Ōtsuka Station (野州大塚駅, Yashū-Ōtsuka-eki) is a railway station in the city of Tochigi, Tochigi, Japan, operated by the private railway operator Tobu Railway. The station is numbered "TN-32".

== Lines ==
Yashū-Ōtsuka Station is served by the Tobu Utsunomiya Line, and is 3.9 km from the starting point of the line at Shin-Tochigi.

== Station layout ==
The station consists of two opposed side platforms connected to the station building by a footbridge.

=== Platforms ===
1	■ Tobu Utsunomiya Line	for Tochigi
2	■ Tobu Utsunomiya Line	for Tōbu Utsunomiya

== History ==
Yashū-Ōtsuka Station opened on 1 November 1931. From 17 March 2012, station numbering was introduced on all Tobu lines, with Yashū-Ōtsuka Station becoming "TN-32".

== Passenger statistics ==
In fiscal 2019, the station was used by an average of 513 passengers daily (boarding passengers only).

== Surrounding area ==
- Former Kou village hall
- Kou Post Office

== See also ==
- List of railway stations in Japan
