= Nishi-Kawada Station =

Railway station in Utsunomiya, Tochigi Prefecture, Japan

TN37 Nishi-Kawada Station 西川田駅
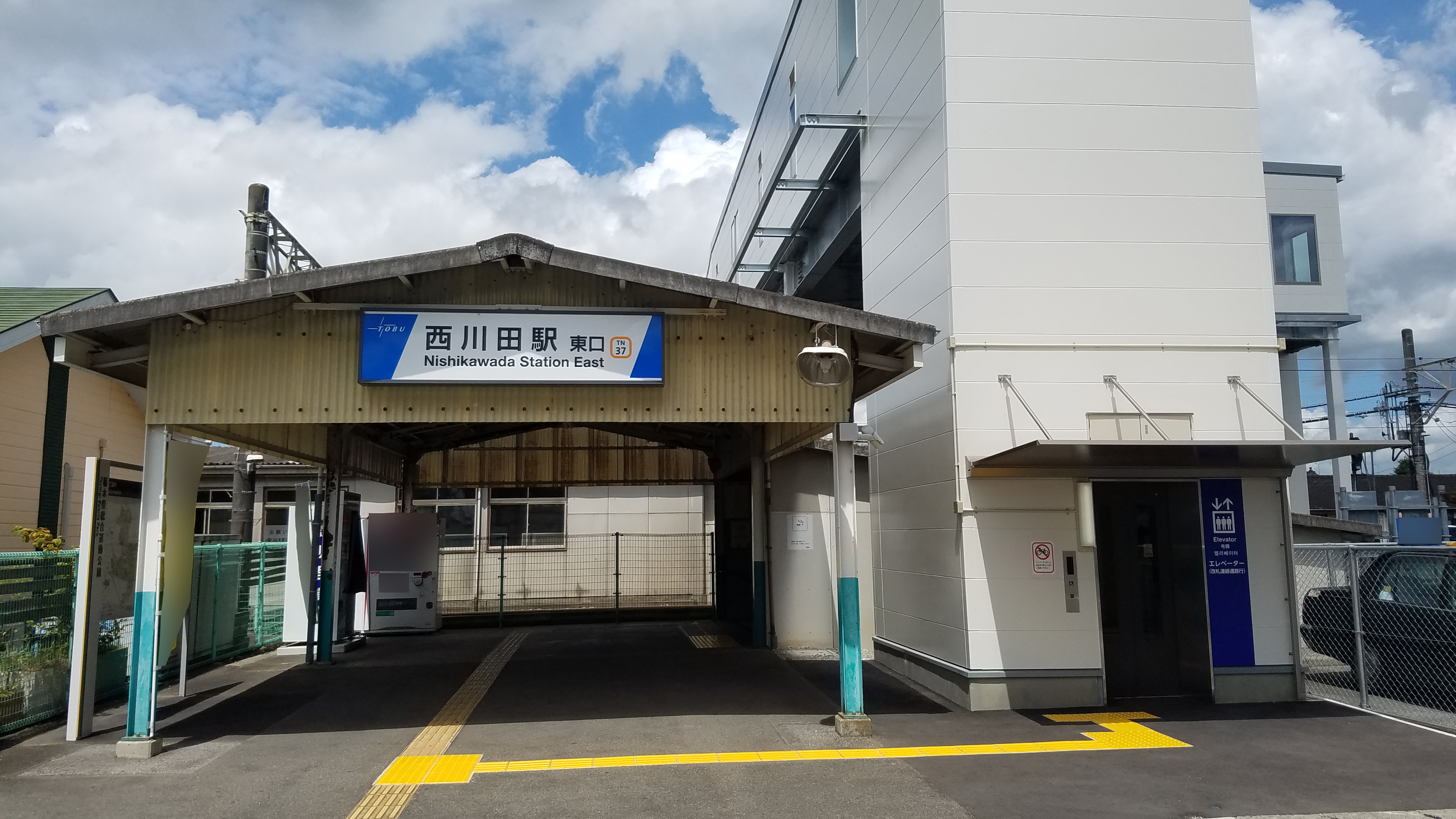
- Nishi-Kawada Station in August 2021

General information
- Location: 5-1-17 Nishi-Kawada, Utsunomiya-shi, Tochigi-ken 321-0152; Japan
- Coordinates: 36°30′53″N 139°51′03″E
- Operator: Tobu Railway
- Line: ■ Tobu Utsunomiya Line
- Distance: 18.3 km from Shin-Tochigi
- Platforms: 1 island platform

Other information
- Station code: TN-37
- Website: Official website

History
- Opened: 11 August 1931

Passengers
- FY2019: 2410 daily

Services
Preceding station	Tobu Railway	Following station
Yasuzuka TN36 towards Shin-Tochigi	Utsunomiya Line	Esojima TN38 towards Tōbu-Utsunomiya
Location
- Location within Tochigi Prefecture Location within Japan

Nishi-Kawada Station (西川田駅, Nishi-Kawada-eki) is a railway station in the city of Utsunomiya, Tochigi, Japan, operated by the private railway operator Tobu Railway. The station is numbered "TN-37".

== Lines ==
Nishi-Kawada Station is served by the Tobu Utsunomiya Line, and is 18.3 km from the starting point of the line at Shin-Tochigi.

== Station layout ==
The station consists of one island platform connected to the station building by an underground passageway.

=== Platforms ===
1	■ Tobu Utsunomiya Line	for Tōbu Utsunomiya
2	■ Tobu Utsunomiya Line	for Tochigi

== History ==
Nishi-Kawada Station opened on 11 August 1931.

From 17 March 2012, station numbering was introduced on all Tobu lines, with Nishi-Kawada Station becoming "TN-37".

== Passenger statistics ==
In fiscal 2019, the station was used by an average of 2410 passengers daily (boarding passengers only).

== Surrounding area ==
- Tochigi General Sports Center
- JGSDF Camp Kita-Utsunomiya

== See also ==
- List of railway stations in Japan
