= Minami-Utsunomiya Station =

Railway station in Utsunomiya, Tochigi Prefecture, Japan

TN39 Minami-Utsunomiya Station 南宇都宮駅
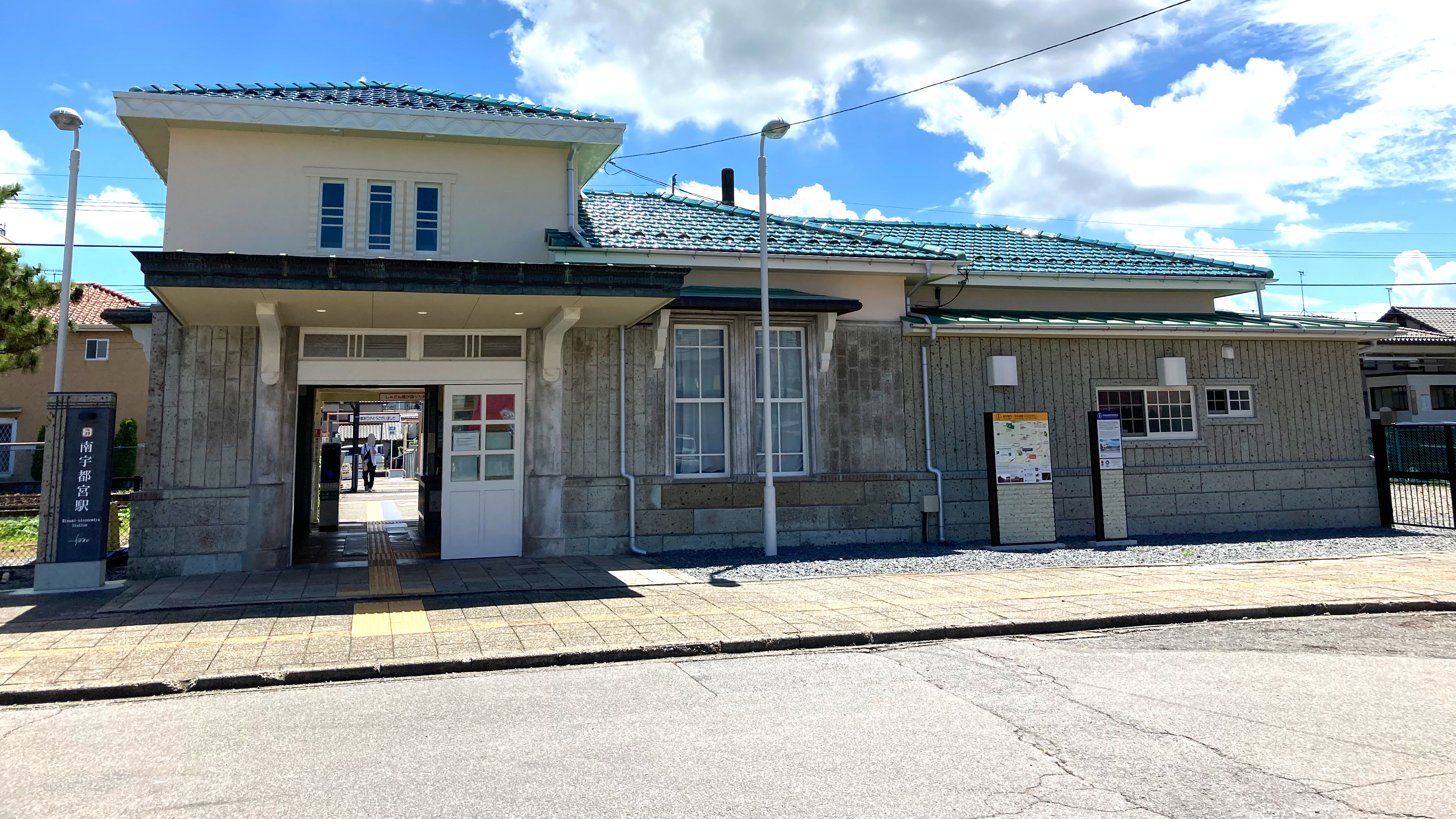
- Minami-Utsunomiya Station in August 2021

General information
- Location: 2-8-23 Yoshino, Utsunomiya-shi, Tochigi-ken 320-0838; Japan
- Coordinates: 36.5440°N 139.8718°E
- Operator: Tobu Railway
- Line: ■ Tobu Utsunomiya Line
- Platforms: 1 island platform

Other information
- Station code: TN-39
- Website: Official website

History
- Opened: 17 April 1932
- Former names: Yakkyujomae (until 1932)

Passengers
- FY2019: 1205 daily

Services
Preceding station	Tobu Railway	Following station
Esojima TN38 towards Shin-Tochigi	Utsunomiya Line	Tōbu-Utsunomiya TN40 Terminus
Location
- Location within Tochigi Prefecture Location within Japan

Minami-Utsunomiya Station (南宇都宮駅, Minami-Utsunomiya-eki) is a railway station in the city of Utsunomiya, Tochigi, Japan, operated by the private railway operator Tobu Railway. The station is numbered "TN-39".

== Lines ==
Minami-Utsunomiya Station is served by the Tobu Utsunomiya Line, and is 22.1 km from the starting point of the line at Shin-Tochigi.

== Station layout ==
The station consists of one island platform connected to the station building by a level crossing.

=== Platforms ===
1	■ Tobu Utsunomiya Line	for Tōbu Utsunomiya
2	■ Tobu Utsunomiya Line	for Tochigi

== History ==
Minami-Utsunomiya Station opened on 17 April 1932 as Yakkyujomae Station (野球場前駅). It was renamed to its present name on 15 December 1932.

From 17 March 2012, station numbering was introduced on all Tobu lines, with Minami-Utsunomiya Station becoming "TN-39".

== Passenger statistics ==
In fiscal 2019, the station was used by an average of 1205 passengers daily (boarding passengers only).

== Surrounding area ==
- Utsunomiya Culture Center
- Utsnomiya Public Library

== See also ==
- List of railway stations in Japan
