= Omocha-no-Machi Station =

Railway station in Mibu, Tochigi Prefecture, Japan

Coordinates: 36°27′58″N 139°49′46″E

TN35 Omocha-no-Machi Station おもちゃのまち駅
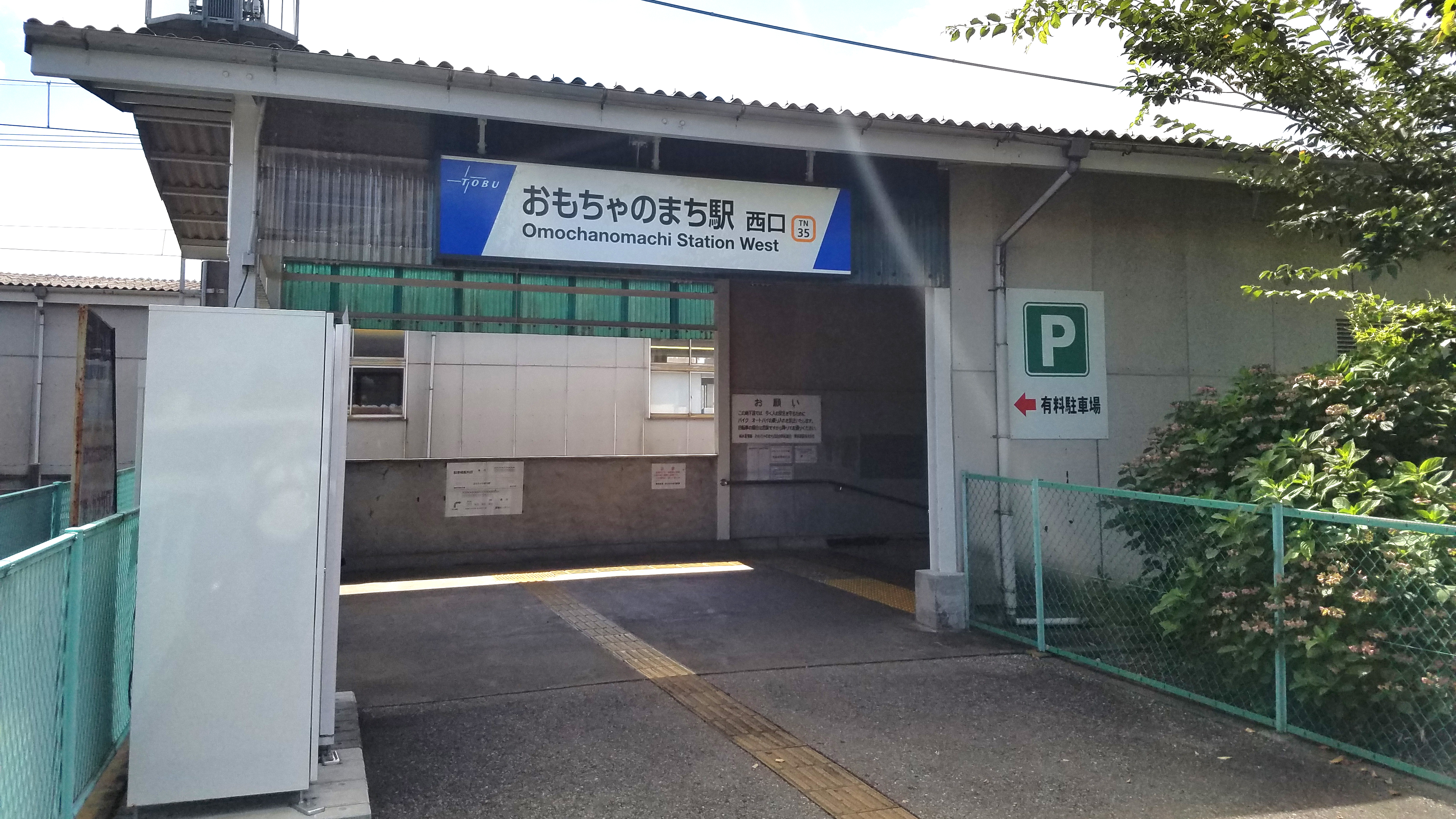
- Omocha-no-Machi Station in August 2021

General information
- Location: 1-22-1 Saiwai-cho, Mibu, Shimotsuga, Tochigi （栃木県下都賀郡壬生町幸町1丁目22-1） Japan
- Operator: Tobu Railway
- Line: Tobu Utsunomiya Line

Other information
- Station code: TN-35

History
- Opened: 1965

Passengers
- FY2014: 2532 daily

Services
Preceding station	Tobu Railway	Following station
Kuniya TN34 towards Shin-Tochigi	Utsunomiya Line	Yasuzuka TN36 towards Tōbu-Utsunomiya
Location

Omocha-no-Machi Station (おもちゃのまち駅, Omocha-no-Machi-eki) is a railway station on the Tobu Utsunomiya Line in Mibu, Tochigi, Japan, operated by the private railway operator Tobu Railway. The station is numbered "TN-35".

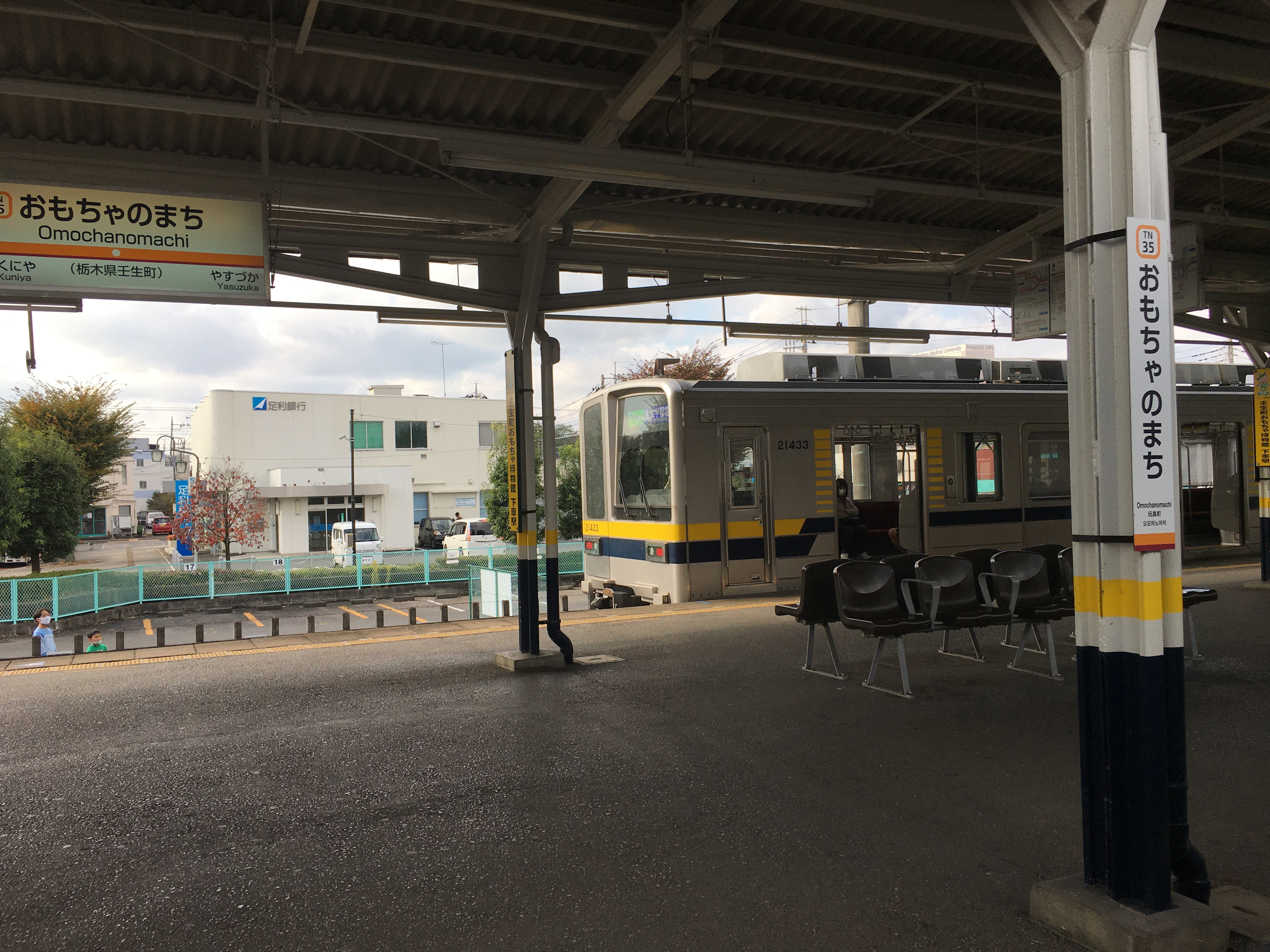
Station platforms, 2020

== Lines ==
Omocha-no-Machi Station is served by the Tobu Utsunomiya Line, and is 12.6 km from the starting point of the line at Shin-Tochigi.

== Station layout ==
The station consists of one island platforms connected to the station building by an underground passageway.

=== Platforms ===
1	■ Tobu Utsunomiya Line	for Tochigi
2	■ Tobu Utsunomiya Line	for Tōbu Utsunomiya

== History ==
Omocha-no-Machi Station opened on 1 April 1965. From 17 March 2012, station numbering was introduced on all Tobu lines, with Omocha-no-Machi Station becoming "TN-35".

== Surrounding area ==
- Mibu Toy Museum
- Omocha danchi

== See also ==
- List of railway stations in Japan
