= Mibu Station =

Railway station in Mibu, Tochigi Prefecture, Japan

Coordinates: 36.4227°N 139.8051°E

TN33 Mibu Station 壬生駅
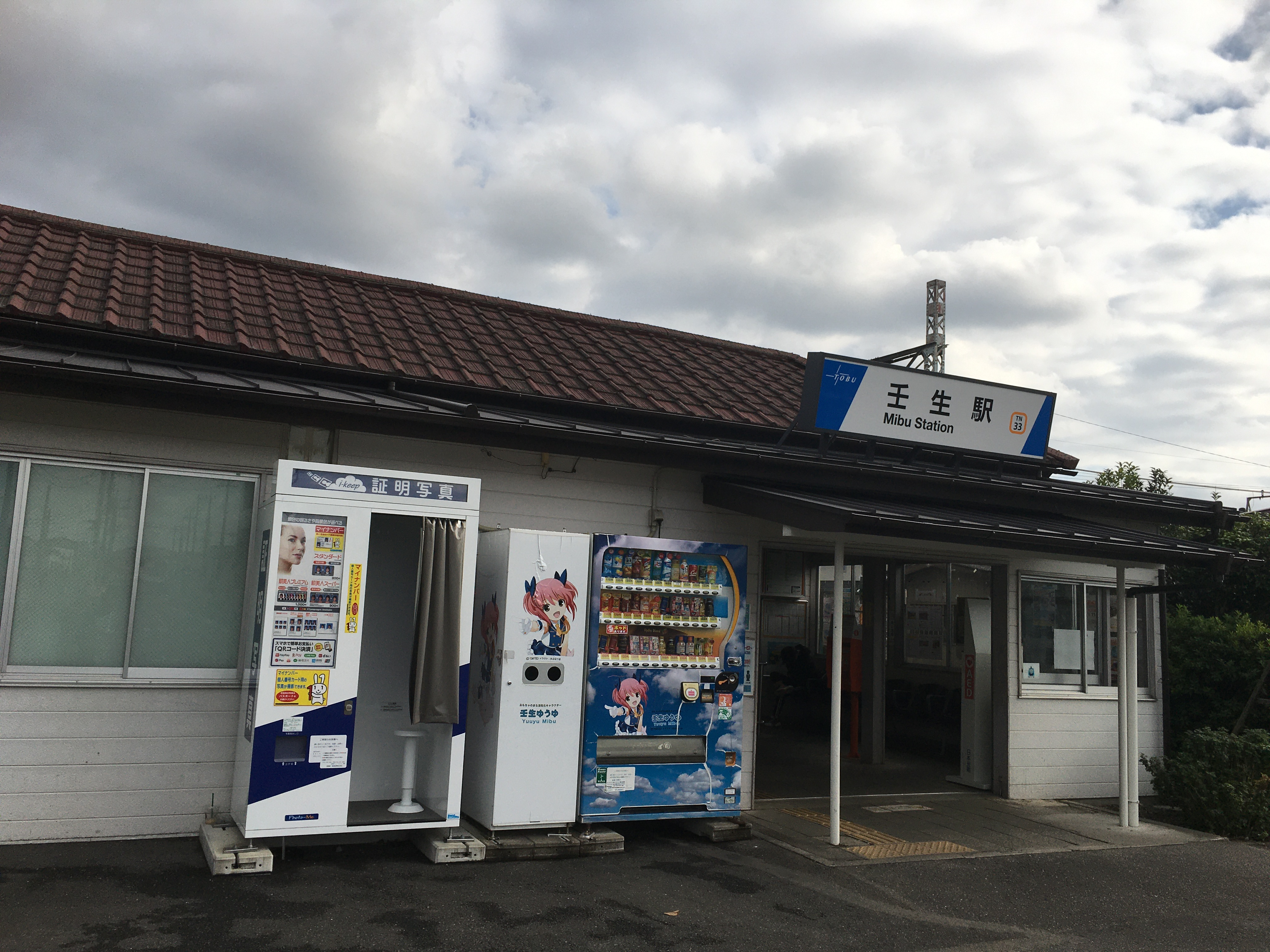
- Mibu Station in November 2020

General information
- Location: 3-1 Ekihigashi-cho, Mibu, Shimotsuga, Tochigi （栃木県下都賀郡壬生町駅東町3-1） Japan
- Operator: Tobu Railway
- Line: Tobu Utsunomiya Line

Other information
- Station code: TN-33

History
- Opened: 1931

Passengers
- FY2011: 2,119 daily

Services
Preceding station	Tobu Railway	Following station
Yashū-Ōtsuka TN32 towards Shin-Tochigi	Utsunomiya Line	Kuniya TN34 towards Tōbu-Utsunomiya
Location

Mibu Station (壬生駅, Mibu-eki) is a railway station on the Tobu Utsunomiya Line in Mibu, Tochigi, Japan. It is operated by the private railway company Tobu Railway and is designed with the station is numbered "TN-33".

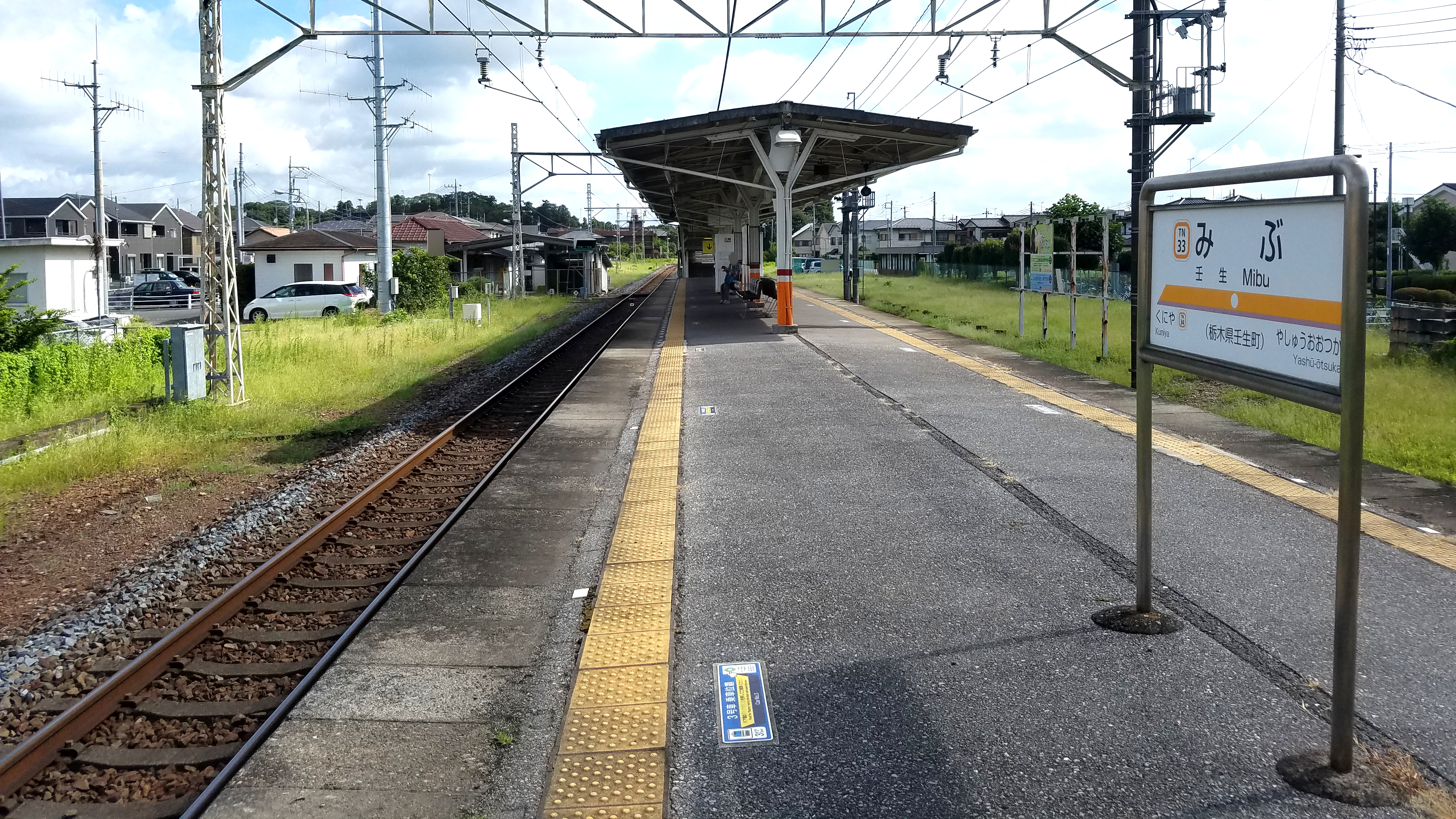
The platform in August 2021

== Lines ==
Mibu Station is served by the Tobu Utsunomiya Line and is located 7.3 km from the line's starting point at Shin-Tochigi.

== Station layout ==
The station has one island platforms, which is connected to the station building via an underground passageway.

=== Platforms ===
1	■ Tobu Utsunomiya Line	for Tōbu Utsunomiya
2	■ Tobu Utsunomiya Line	for Tochigi

== History ==
Mibu Station opened on 11 August 1931. From 17 March 2012, station numbering was introduced on all Tobu lines, with Mibu Station becoming "TN-33".

== Surrounding area ==
- Mibu Town Hall
- Site of former Mibu Castle
- Mibu Central Post Office

== See also ==
- List of railway stations in Japan
