= Yashū-Hirakawa Station =

Railway station in Tochigi, Tochigi Prefecture, Japan

TN31 Yashū-Hirakawa Station 野州平川駅
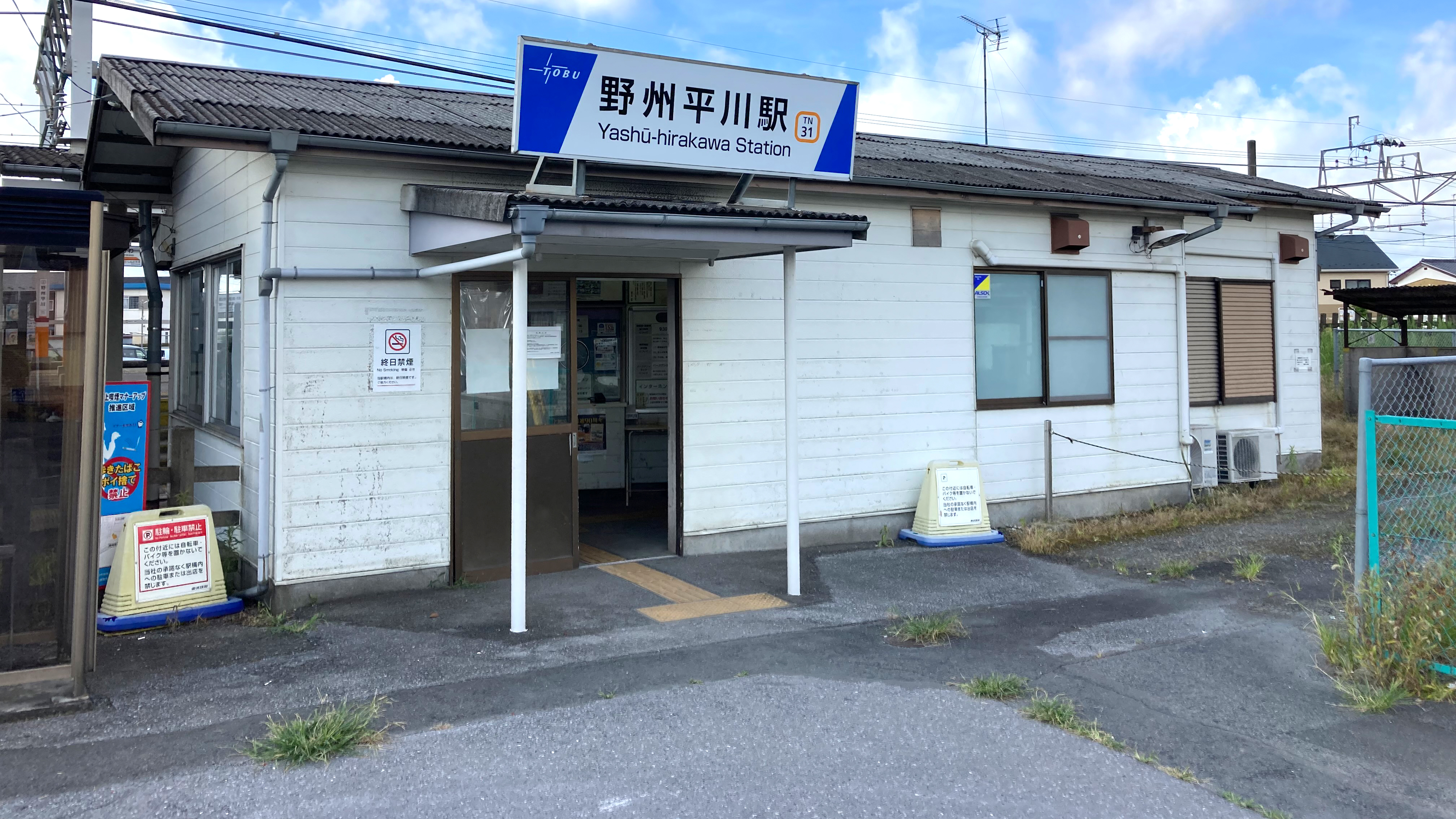
- Yashū-Hirakawa Station in August 2021

General information
- Location: 2290-19 Omiya-machi, Tochigi-shi, Tochigi-ken 328-0011; Japan
- Coordinates: 36.4015°N 139.7538°E
- Operator: Tobu Railway
- Line: ■ Tobu Utsunomiya Line
- Distance: 2.0 km from Shin-Tochigi
- Platforms: 2 side platforms

Other information
- Station code: TN-31
- Website: Official website

History
- Opened: 1 October 1944

Passengers
- FY2019: 1009 daily

Services
Preceding station	Tobu Railway	Following station
Shin-Tochigi TN12 Terminus	Utsunomiya Line	Yashū-Ōtsuka TN32 towards Tōbu-Utsunomiya
Location
- Location within Tochigi Prefecture Location within Japan

Yashū-Hirakawa Station (野州平川駅, Yashū-Hirakawa-eki) is a railway station in the city of Tochigi, Tochigi, Japan, operated by the private railway operator Tobu Railway. The station is numbered "TN-31".

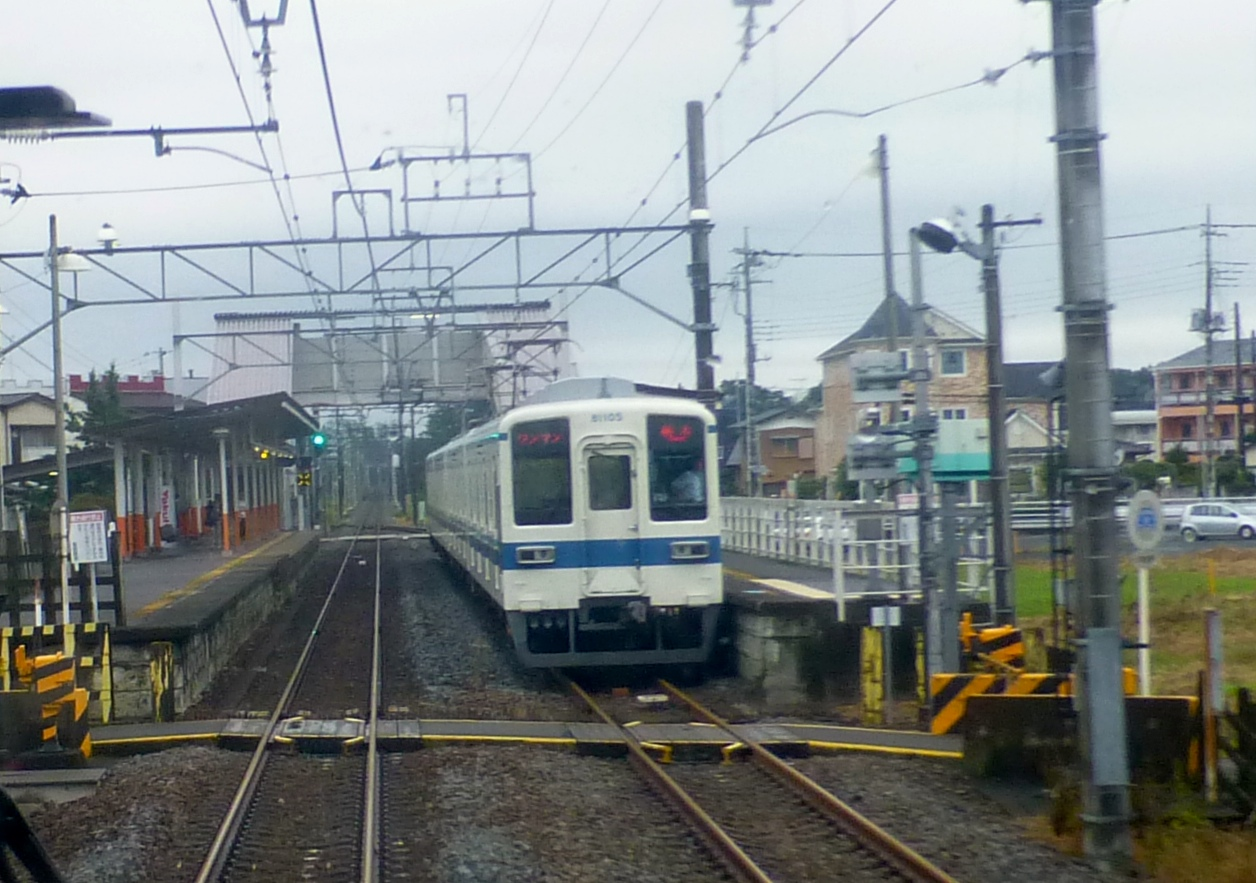
Platforms and a train, 2016

== Lines ==
Yashū-Hirakawa Station is served by the Tobu Utsunomiya Line, and is 2.0 km from the starting point of the line at Shin-Tochigi.

== Station layout ==
The station consists of two opposed side platforms connected to the station building by a footbridge.

=== Platforms ===
1	■ Tobu Utsunomiya Line	for Tochigi
2	■ Tobu Utsunomiya Line	for Tōbu Utsunomiya

== History ==
Yashū-Hirakawa Station opened on 1 October 1944. From 17 March 2012, station numbering was introduced on all Tobu lines, with Yashū-Hirakawa Station becoming "TN-31".

== Passenger statistics ==
In fiscal 2019, the station was used by an average of 1009 passengers daily (boarding passengers only).

== Surrounding area ==
- Hirakawa Industrial Park

== See also ==
- List of railway stations in Japan
