= Mibu Ichirizuka =

- 壬生一里塚 (Japanese)
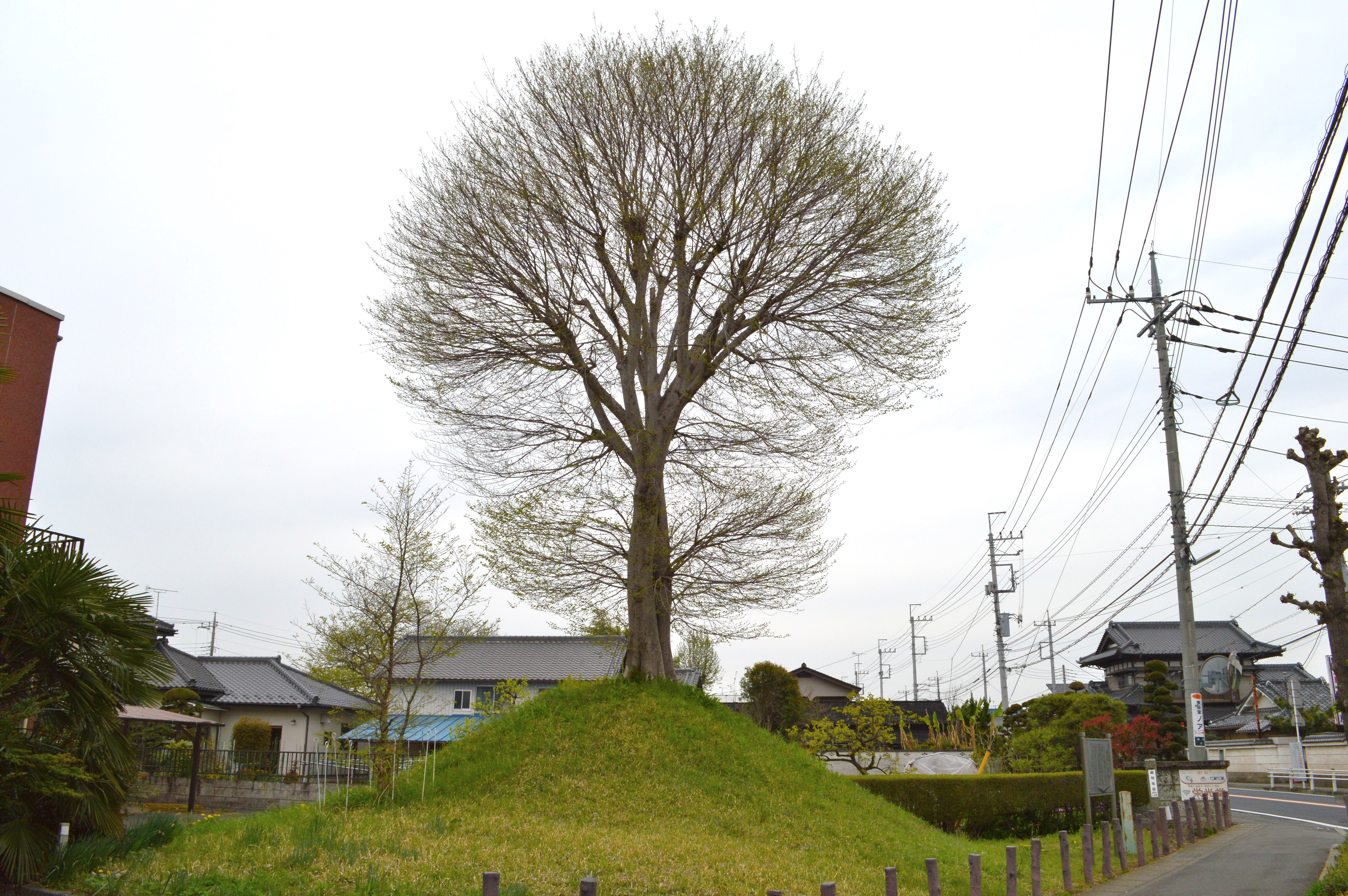
- Mibu Ichirizuka

- Mibu Ichirizuka Mibu Ichirizuka (Japan)
- 36°24′57″N 139°48′12″E
- Periods: Edo period
- Location: Mibu, Tochigi, Japan
- Region: Kantō region

Site notes
- Public access: Yes

The Mibu Ichirizuka (壬生一里塚) is a historic Japanese distance marker akin to a milestone, originally comprising a pair of earthen mounds located in what is now part of the town of Mibu, Tochigi Prefecture in the northern Kantō region of Japan. It was designated a National Historic Site of Japan in 1928.

== Overview ==
During the Edo period the Tokugawa shogunate established ichirizuka on major roads, enabling calculation both of distance travelled and of the charge for transportation by kago or palanquin. These mounds denoted the distance in ri (3.927 kilometres (2.440 mi)) to Nihonbashi, the "Bridge of Japan", erected in Edo in 1603. They were typically planted with an enoki or Japanese red pine to provide shelter for travelers. Since the Meiji period, most of the ichirizuka have disappeared, having been destroyed by the elements, modern highway construction and urban encroachment. In 1876, the "Ichirizuka Abolition decree" was issued by the Meiji government and many were demolished at that time. Currently, 17 surviving ichirizuka are designated as national historic sites.

In the case of the Mibu Ichirizuka, the mounds flanked the Nikkō Kaidō (日光街道), and were 23 ri (approximately 90 kilometers) from Nihonbashi. The Nikkō Kaidō was one of the Edo Five Routes and it was built to connect Edo with the temple-shrine complex of Nikkō for pilgrimages by the Shōgun and major daimyō. Only one of the original pair of mounds of Mibu Ichirizuka survives. Each originally occupied a square that was nine meters on a side, the survivor has collapsed into a circular shape due to rain and exposure to the elements for centuries, and now measures about five meters in diameter with height of two meters.

Due to the road renovation carried out in 1884, the main route of what was once the Nikkō Kaidō was relocated to the east, becoming Japan National Route 4. The original highway deteriorated into a village road, and thus this ichirizuka was spared from demolition. The Mibu Ichirizuka is about 10 minutes on foot from Mibu Station on the Tōbu Railway Utsunomiya Line.

== See also ==
- List of Historic Sites of Japan (Tochigi)
