= Shin-Kanuma rail accident =

August 2026 rail accident in Tochigi Prefecture, Japan

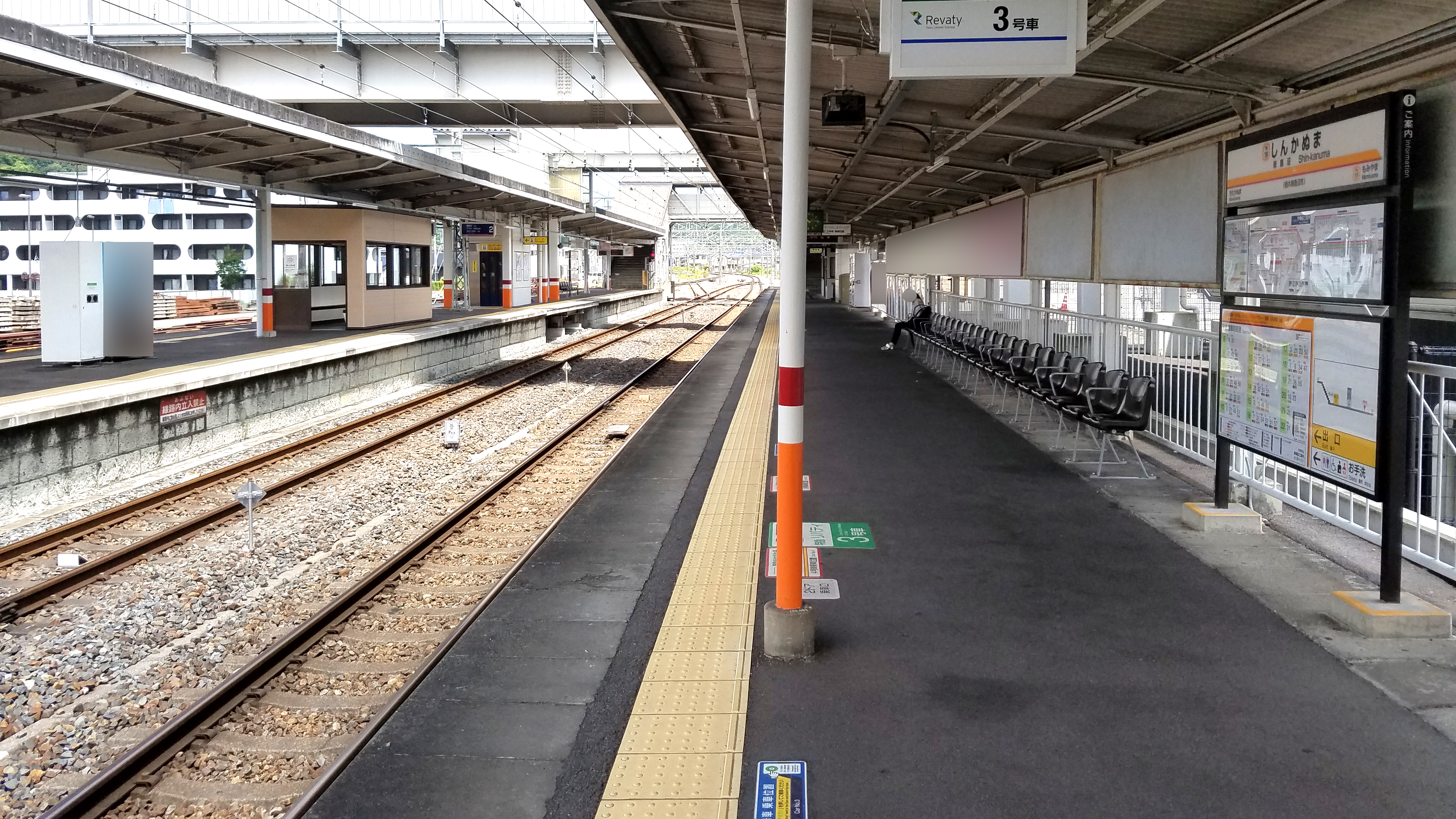
- Tracks at Shin-Kanuma station, where the accident took place. The accident occurred just beyond the station platforms.

Details
- Date: 20 August 2026; 2 months ago 10:45 JST
- Location: Shin-Kanuma Station, Kanuma, Tochigi Prefecture, Japan
- Coordinates: 36.5577°N 139.7447°E
- Line: Tobu Nikko Line
- Operator: Tobu Railway
- Incident type: Track maintenance crew struck by train
- Cause: Breakdown in communication and safety monitoring

Statistics
- Trains: 1
- Passengers: Approx. 50
- Deaths: 4
- Injured: 0

On 20 August 2026, a Spacia X limited-express train operated by Tobu Railway struck a maintenance crew near Shin-Kanuma Station on the Tobu Nikko Line in Kanuma, Tochigi Prefecture, Japan. Four maintenance workers were killed.

== Incident ==
At approximately 10:45 JST on 20 August 2026, a six-car Spacia X limited-express train travelling from Tobu-Nikko Station bound for Asakusa Station in Tokyo was approaching its scheduled stop at Shin-Kanuma Station.

At the time, a maintenance team was clearing weeds from around the tracks near the station platform. As the train approached the station, it struck four members of the crew. Emergency services were alerted at 10:47 JST. Upon arrival, first responders found three workers trapped beneath the train and a fourth on the platform. All four men were transported to the hospital, where they were pronounced dead.

The victims were identified as Kazuyoshi Ishikawa (67 years old), Toshihiko Watanabe (65), Shigenobu Oke (53), and Kazunari Sato (54). They were subcontractors of Tobu Construction, an affiliate of Tobu Railway.

== Operational impact ==
Following the collision, train services on the Tobu Nikko Line were temporarily suspended between Shin-Tochigi Station and Shimo-Imaichi Station to allow emergency services and investigators to clear the scene. Service resumed later that afternoon at 3:22 p.m. JST, affecting approximately 2,600 passengers.

== Initial investigations ==
The Japan Transport Safety Board (JTSB) dispatched three railway accident investigators to the site to initiate an inquiry. In addition, the Tochigi prefectural police opened an investigation into Tobu Construction on suspicion of professional negligence resulting in death.

Initial investigations focused on safety monitoring and communication procedures among the maintenance team. According to Tobu Railway, ten personnel were involved in the operation, including track workers and dedicated lookouts provided by a security subcontractor. Standard operating procedures required a relay lookout positioned around 300 meters away to signal an approaching train to a station-side lookout, who would then direct workers off the track and show a flag signal to the train driver.

The train driver reported receiving a clear signal (a yellow flag held horizontally) from the station lookout about 200 meters ahead, indicating that the track was clear, before entering the platform area. However, initial statements from the relay lookouts indicated that communication between the lookouts broke down prior to the collision, leading investigators to suspect inadequate safety monitoring at the scene.

== Aftermath ==
On the afternoon of the incident, Tobu Railway held a press conference in Tokyo. Takao Suzuki, head of the company's railway business division, issued a public apology to the families of the victims and stated that Tobu Railway would cooperate fully with official investigations while implementing measures to prevent recurrence. On 23 August, the Tochigi prefectural police raided a Tobu Railway group company office on suspicion of professional negligence causing death in connection with the fatal accident.

Tobu Railway released an interim report on 1 October, revealing severe safety rule violations during track weeding operations. The investigation disclosed that the site supervisor from Tobu Construction failed to position lookouts or establish evacuation locations, instead leaving operations to an off-duty superior to take record-keeping photos. Communication breakdowns also left relay lookouts unstationed, while the primary lookout stayed silent about the tight schedule due to fear of reprimand, ultimately causing the train to strike the workers who were positioned with their backs to the tracks.
