= Omocha =

The term omocha, a romanization of the Japanese word for "toy", may refer to the following:

== Places ==
- Omocha-no-Machi Station

== Fiction ==
=== 1900s ===
- The younger sister portrayed by Isuzu Yamada in 1936 film Sisters of the Gion
- Kodomo no Omocha, a 1994 manga series
- Kirby no Omocha Hako, 1996 video game series
- The Geisha House, a 1998 film

=== 2000s ===
- Lotte no Omocha!, a 2007 manga series
- Omocha no Kuni de Daikessen da Koron!, a 2009 film
- Eiga Furesshu Purikyua! Omocha no Kuni wa Himitsu ga Ippai!?, a 2009 film
- Astarotte no Omocha!, a 2011 anime adaptation of Lotte
