= Shin-Kanuma Station =

Railway station in Kanuma, Tochigi Prefecture, Japan

TN18 Shin-Kanuma Station 新鹿沼駅
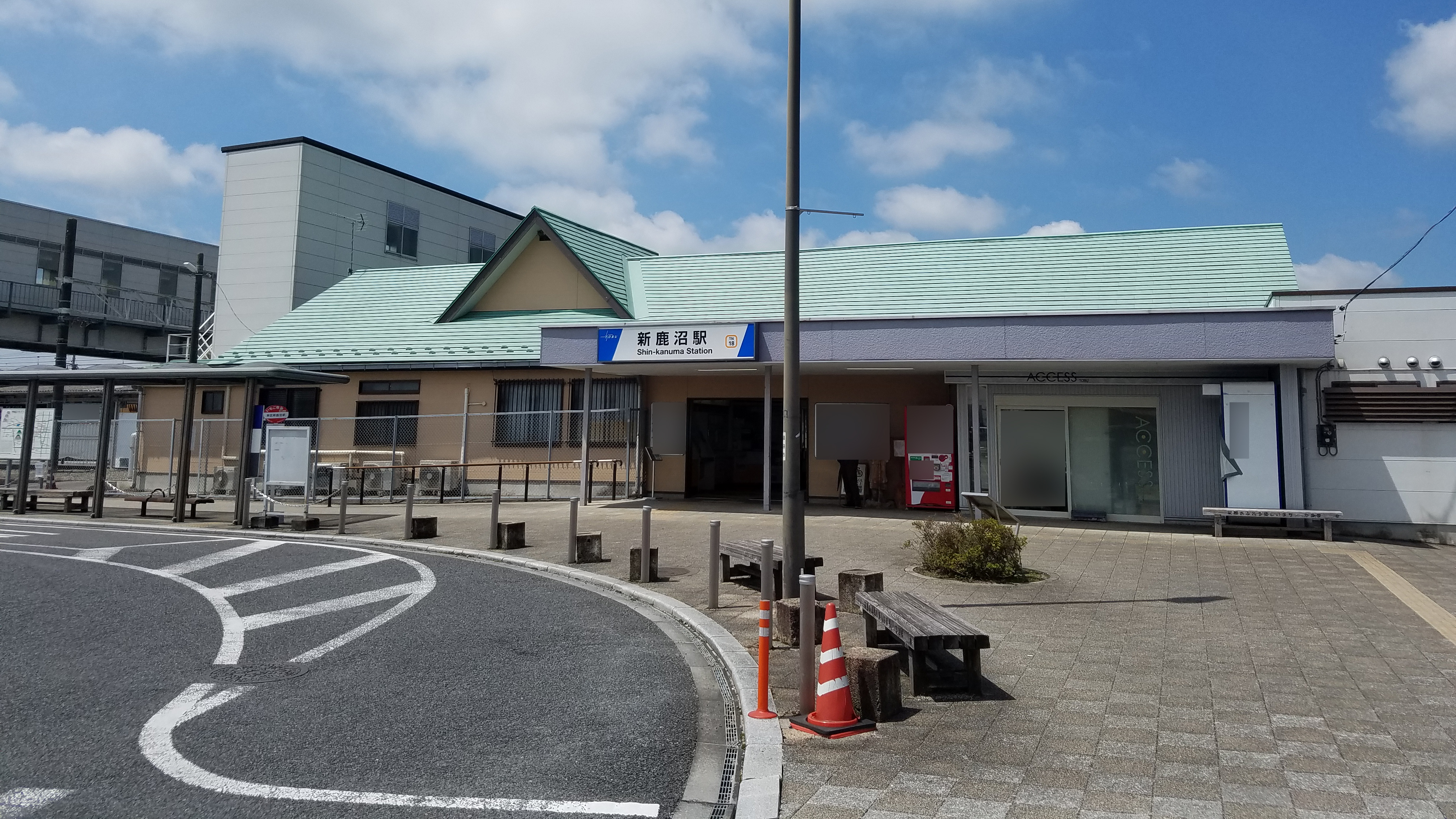
- Shin-Kanuma Station in August 2021

General information
- Location: 1475 Toriidocho, Kanuma-shi, Tochigi-ken 322-0044; Japan
- Coordinates: 36.5573°N 139.7454°E
- Operator: Tobu Railway
- Line: Tobu Nikko Line
- Distance: 66.8 km from Tōbu-Dōbutsu-Kōen
- Platforms: 1 side +1 island platform

Other information
- Station code: TN-18
- Website: Official website

History
- Opened: 1 April 1929

Passengers
- FY2020: 3379 daily

Services
Preceding station	Tobu Railway	Following station
Tochigi TN11 towards Shinjuku	Nikkō and Kinugawa	Shimo-Imaichi TN23 towards Tōbu–Nikkō or Kinugawa–Onsen
Tochigi TN11 towards Asakusa	Spacia X	Shimo-Imaichi TN23 towards Tōbu–Nikkō or Kinugawa–Onsen
Tochigi TN11 towards Asakusa	Kegon	Shimo-Imaichi TN23 towards Tōbu–Nikkō
Tochigi TN11 towards Asakusa	Kinu	Shimo-Imaichi TN23 towards Kinugawa–Onsen
Tochigi TN11 towards Asakusa	Aizu	Shimo-Imaichi TN23 towards Shin-Fujiwara
Shin-Tochigi TN12 towards Minami-Kurihashi	Nikkō Line Express	Shimo-Imaichi TN23 towards Tōbu–Nikkō
Momiyama TN17 towards Tōbu-Dōbutsu-Kōen	Nikkō Line Local	Kita-Kanuma TN19 towards Tōbu–Nikkō
Location
- Location within Tochigi Prefecture Location within Japan

Shin-Kanuma Station (新鹿沼駅, Shin-Kanuma-eki) is a railway station in the city of Kanuma, Tochigi, Japan, operated by the private railway operator Tobu Railway. The station is numbered "TN-18".

== Lines ==
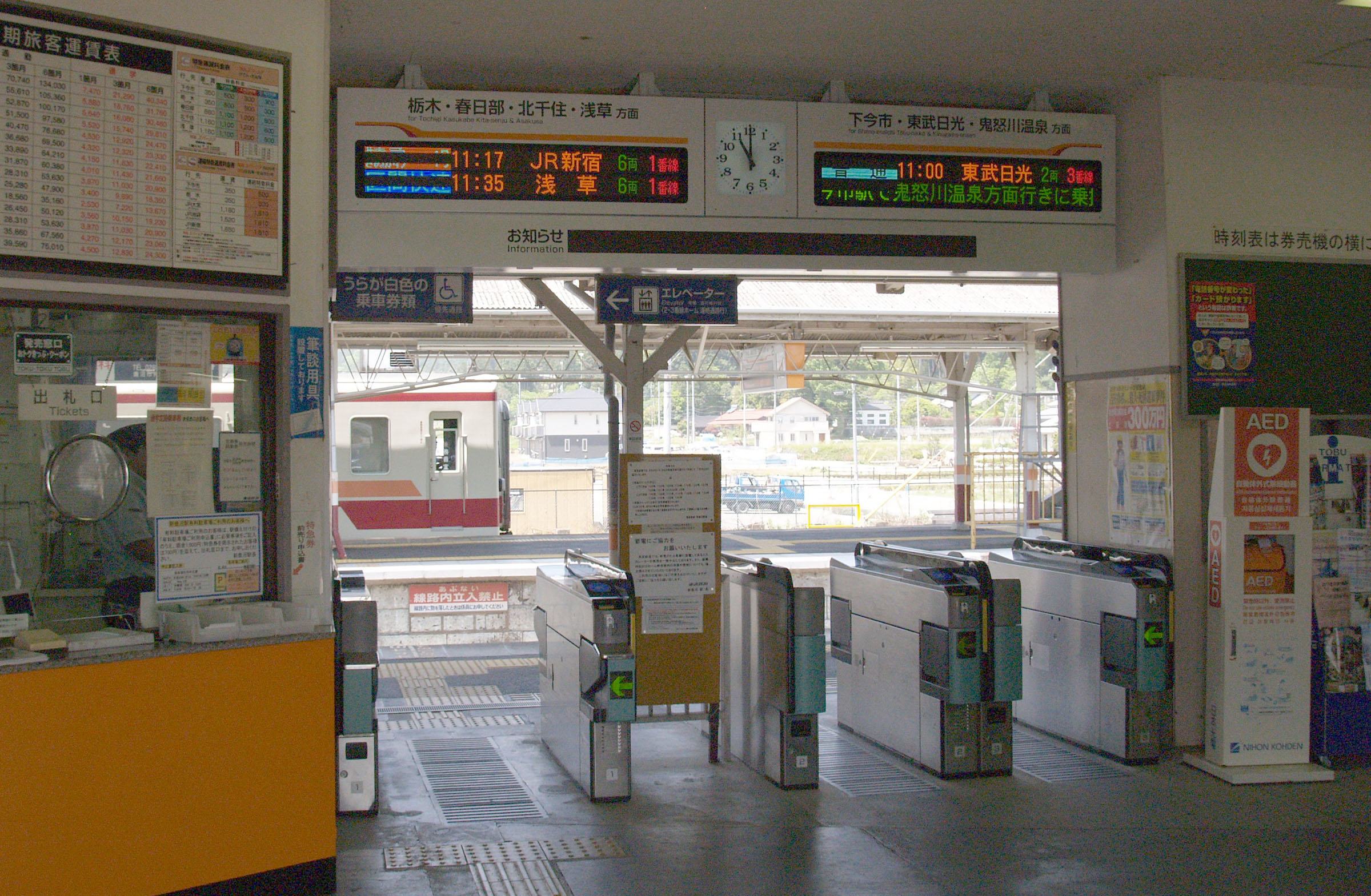
The ticket barriers to the Shin-Kanuma station platforms, May 2011

Shin-Kanuma Station is served by the Tobu Nikko Line, and is 66.8 km from the starting point of the line at Tōbu-Dōbutsu-Kōen.

== Station layout ==
This station consists of one side platform and one island platform, connected to the station building by a footbridge and also an overhead passageway served by elevators.

=== Platforms ===
1	■ Tobu Nikko Line	for Shin-Tochigi and Tōbu-Dōbutsu-Kōen
2	■ Tobu Nikko Line	for Shin-Tochigi and Tōbu-Dōbutsu-Kōen
2	■ Tobu Nikko Line	for Tōbu-Nikkō
3	■ Tobu Nikko Line	for Tōbu-Nikkō

== History ==
Shin-Kanuma Station opened on 1 April 1929.

From 17 March 2012, station numbering was introduced on all Tobu lines, with Shin-Kanuma Station becoming "TN-18".

Tracks located just outside this station was the site of a rail accident which resulted in the death of four maintenance workers.

== Passenger statistics ==
In fiscal 2019, the station was used by an average of 3379 passengers daily (boarding passengers only).

== Surrounding area ==
- National Route 121
- National Route 293
- National Route 352
- Kanuma City Hall
- Kanuma Post Office

== See also ==
- List of railway stations in Japan
