= Mibu =

Mibu 壬生町
- Town
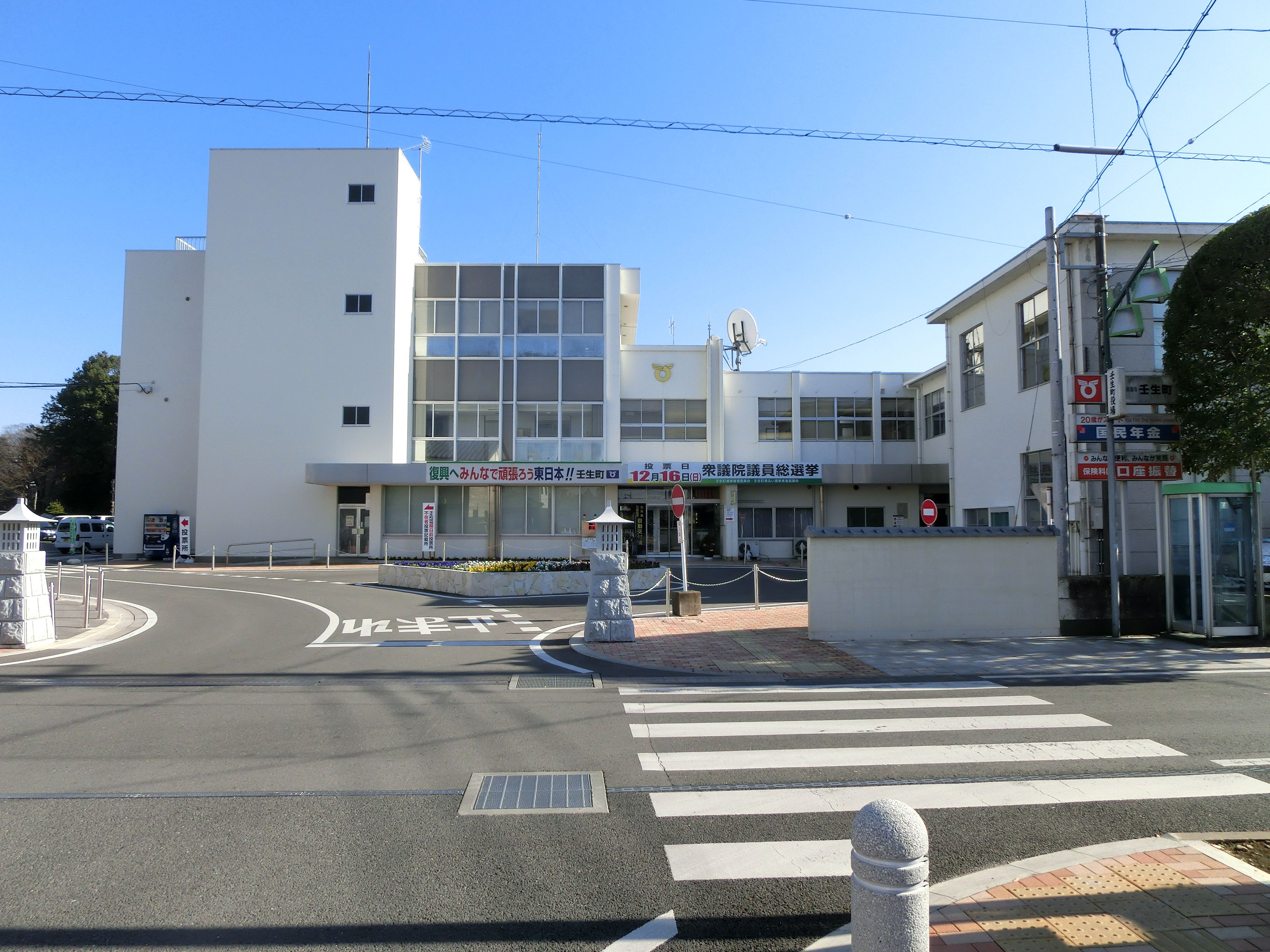
- Mibu Town Office

- Flag Seal

- Location of Mibu in Tochigi Prefecture

- Coordinates: 36°25′37.4″N 139°48′14.3″E
- Country: Japan
- Region: Kantō
- Prefecture: Tochigi
- District: Shimotsuga

Area
  - Total: 61.06 km^{2} (23.58 sq mi)

Population (August 2020)
  - Total: 39,158
  - Density: 641.3/km^{2} (1,661/sq mi)
- Time zone: UTC+9 (Japan Standard Time)
- Tree: Enoki
- Flower: Calabash
- Bird: Eurasian skylark
- Phone number: 0282-81-1806
- Address: 12-22 Torimachi, Mibu-machi, Shimotsuga -gun, Tochigi-ken 321-0292
- Website: Official website

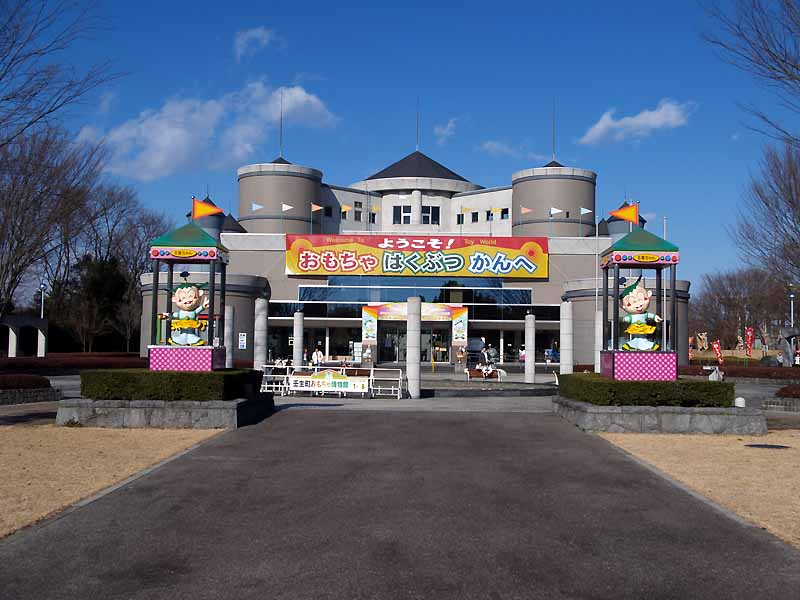
Mibu Toy Museum

Mibu (壬生町, Mibu-machi) is a town located in Tochigi Prefecture, Japan. As of 1 August 2020, the town had an estimated population of 39,158 in 16,149 households, and a population density of 640 persons per km^{2}. The total area of the town is 61.06 square kilometres (23.58 sq mi).

== Geography ==
Mibu is located in south-central Tochigi Prefecture. The town is situated in the northern portion of the Kanto plain and is mostly flat terrain with an elevation of 50 to 100 meters above sea level. The Kurokawa River flows through the town. The is about 90 kilometers north of Tokyo metropolis, and is bordered by the prefectural capital of Utsunomiya to the north. Approximately a third of the land area of the town is covered in rice paddy.

== Surrounding municipalities ==
Tochigi Prefecture

- Kanuma
- Shimotsuke
- Tochigi
- Utsunomiya

== Climate ==
Mibu has a humid subtropical climate (Köppen Cfa) characterized by warm summers and cold winters with heavy snowfall. The average annual temperature in Mibu is 13.8 °C. The average annual rainfall is 1385 mm with September as the wettest month. The temperatures are highest on average in August, at around 26.1 °C, and lowest in January, at around 2.4 °C.

== Demographics ==
Per Japanese census data, the population of Mibu has remained relatively steady over the past 30 years.

Historical population
| Year | Pop. | ±% |
|---|---|---|
| 1920 | 17,785 | — |
| 1930 | 18,999 | +6.8% |
| 1940 | 20,189 | +6.3% |
| 1950 | 26,029 | +28.9% |
| 1960 | 24,007 | −7.8% |
| 1970 | 25,485 | +6.2% |
| 1980 | 35,037 | +37.5% |
| 1990 | 39,588 | +13.0% |
| 2000 | 39,853 | +0.7% |
| 2010 | 39,617 | −0.6% |
| 2020 | 39,474 | −0.4% |

== History ==
The remains of many burial mounds from the Kofun period can be found in Mibu. During the Edo period, the area was controlled by Mibu Domain under the Tokugawa shogunate. The jōkamachi which grew up around Mibu Castle was Mibu-shuku a post station on a branch the Nikkō Kaidō connecting Edo with the shrines at Nikkō. After the Meiji restoration, Mibu town and the villages of Inaba and Minami-Inukai were created within Shimotsuga District on April 1, 1889, with the creation of the modern municipalities system. Inaba merged with Mibu on November 3, 1954, followed by Minami-Inukai on July 28, 1955.

== Government ==
Mibu has a mayor-council form of government with a directly elected mayor and a unicameral town council of 16 members. Mibu contributes one member to the Tochigi Prefectural Assembly. In terms of national politics, the town is part of Tochigi 4th district of the lower house of the Diet of Japan.

== Economy ==
The economy of Mibu is heavily dependent on agriculture; however, the town is increasingly becoming a commuter town for neighboring Utsunomiya.

== Education ==
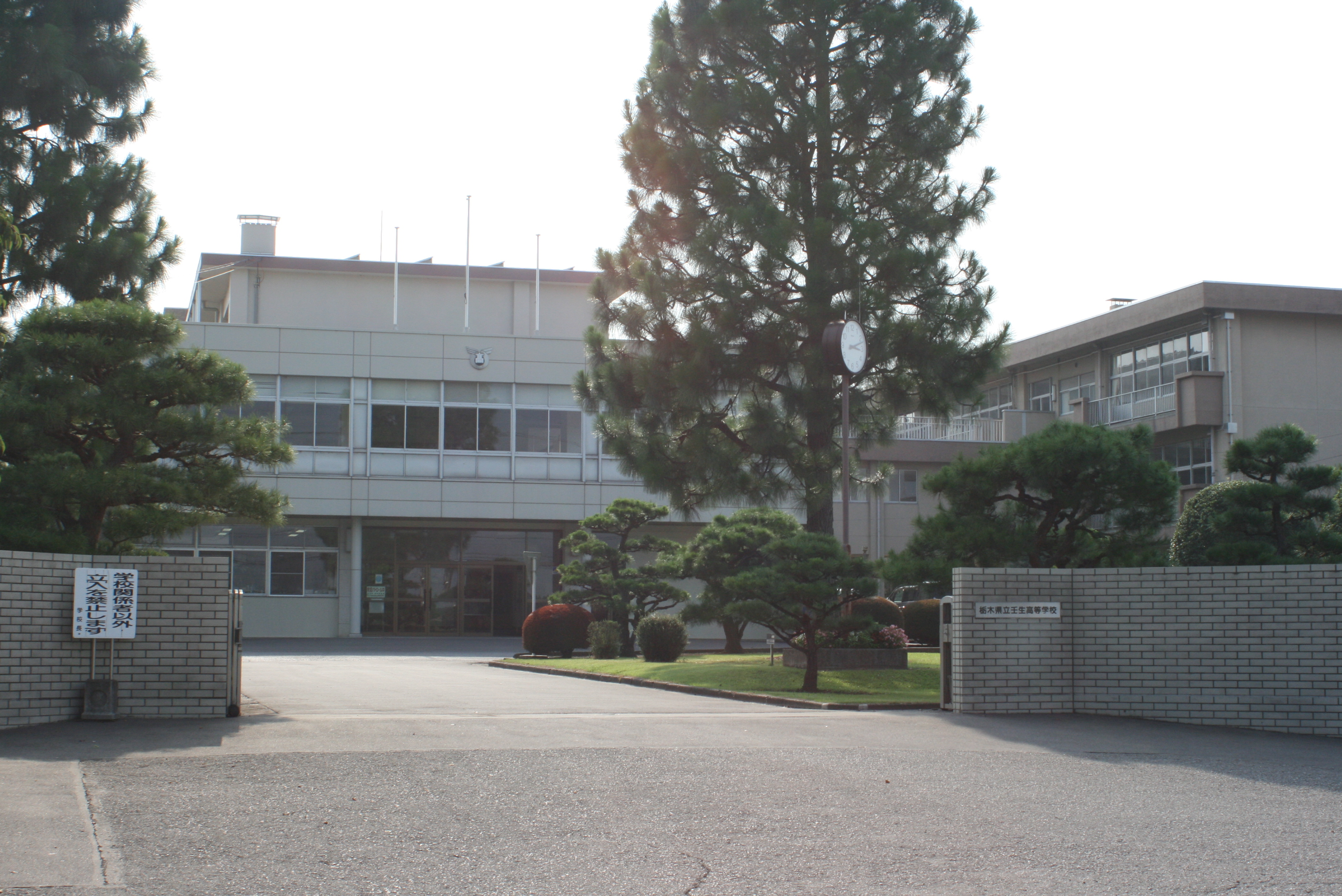
Tochigi Prefectural Mibu High School

- Dokkyo Medical University
- Mibu has eight public primary schools and two public middle schools operated by the town government. The town has one public high school operated by the Tochigi Prefectural Board of Education.
  - Tochigi Prefectural Mibu High School (栃木県立壬生高等学校)
  - Mibu Municipal Mibu Junior High School (壬生町立壬生中学校)
  - Mibu Municipal Minami Inukai Junior High School (壬生町立南犬飼中学校)

== Transportation ==
=== Railway ===
Tobu Railway – Tobu Utsunomiya Line

- Mibu - Kuniya - Omocha-no-Machi - Yasuzuka

=== Highway ===
- Kita-Kantō Expressway – Mibu Parking Area and Mibu Interchange
- National Route 121
- National Route 352

== Local attractions ==
- Atagozuka Kofun, National Historic Site
- Azuma Kofun, National Historic Site
- Chausuyama Kofun, National Historic Site
- Kurumazuka Kofun, National Historic Site
- Site of Mibu Castle
- Mibu Ichirizuka, National Historic Site
- Mibumachi Toy Museum
- Ushizuka Kofun, National Historic Site

== Noted people from Mibu ==
- Ennin, noted Buddhist prelate
- Yuko Oshima, actress and singer
- Kazuyoshi Saito, singer-songwriter
- Tsutomu Sato, politician
