= Tōbu Utsunomiya Line =

Railway line in Tochigi Prefecture, Japan

Utsunomiya Line

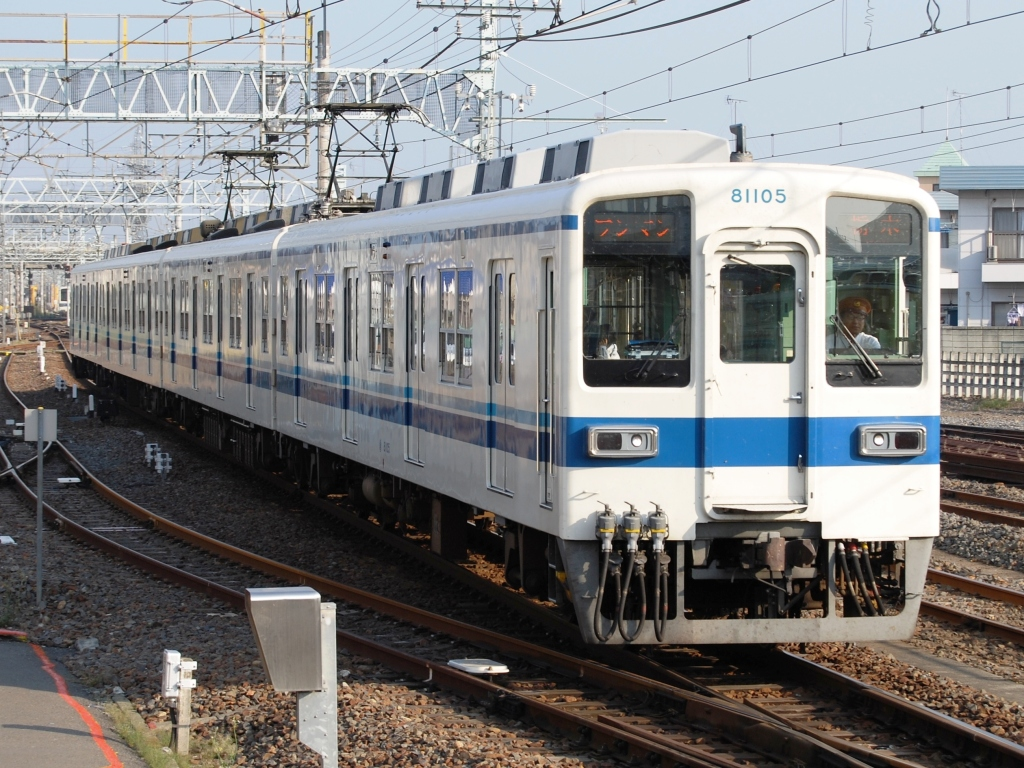
- An 8000 series EMU on the Tobu Utsunomiya Line, October 2008

Overview
- Native name: 宇都宮線
- Status: In service
- Owner: Tobu Railway Co., Ltd.
- Locale: Kantō Region
- Termini: Shin-Tochigi; Tōbu Utsunomiya
- Stations: 11

Service
- Type: Commuter rail
- System: Tobu Railway
- Route number: TN
- Operator(s): Tobu Railway Co., Ltd.
- Rolling stock: Tobu 350 series, Tobu 8000 series, Tobu 20400 series EMUs

History
- Opened: August 11, 1931; 95 years ago

Technical
- Line length: 24.3 km (15.1 mi)
- Track gauge: 1,067 mm (3 ft 6 in)
- Electrification: 1,500 V DC, overhead catenary
- Operating speed: 90 km/h (56 mph)

The Utsunomiya Line (宇都宮線, Utsunomiya-sen) is a 24.3-kilometre (15.1 mi) railway line in Tochigi Prefecture, Japan, owned and operated by the private railway operator Tobu Railway. It connects Shin-Tochigi Station in Tochigi with Tobu Utsunomiya Station in Utsunomiya.

Shin-Tochigi Station offers connections to the Tōbu Nikkō Line and the Tobu Main Line network.

== Stations ==
All stations are in Tochigi Prefecture.

No.	Station	Japanese	Distance (km)	Transfers	Location
TN12	Shin-Tochigi	新栃木	0.0	Nikkō Line (TN12)	Tochigi
TN31	Yashū-Hirakawa	野州平川	2.0		Tochigi
TN32	Yashū-Ōtsuka	野州大塚	3.9		Tochigi
TN33	Mibu	壬生	7.3		Mibu, Shimotsuga District
TN34	Kuniya	国谷	10.8		Mibu, Shimotsuga District
TN35	Omocha-no-Machi	おもちゃのまち	12.6		Mibu, Shimotsuga District
TN36	Yasuzuka	安塚	14.8		Mibu, Shimotsuga District
TN37	Nishi-Kawada	西川田	18.3		Utsunomiya
TN38	Esojima	江曽島	20.3		Utsunomiya
TN39	Minami-Utsunomiya	南宇都宮	22.1		Utsunomiya
TN40	Tōbu-Utsunomiya	東武宇都宮	24.3		Utsunomiya

== Rolling stock ==
- Tobu 350 series EMUs (Shimotsuke limited express services)
- Tobu 8000 series 4-car EMUs (all-stations "Local" services)
- Tobu 20400 series 4-car EMUs
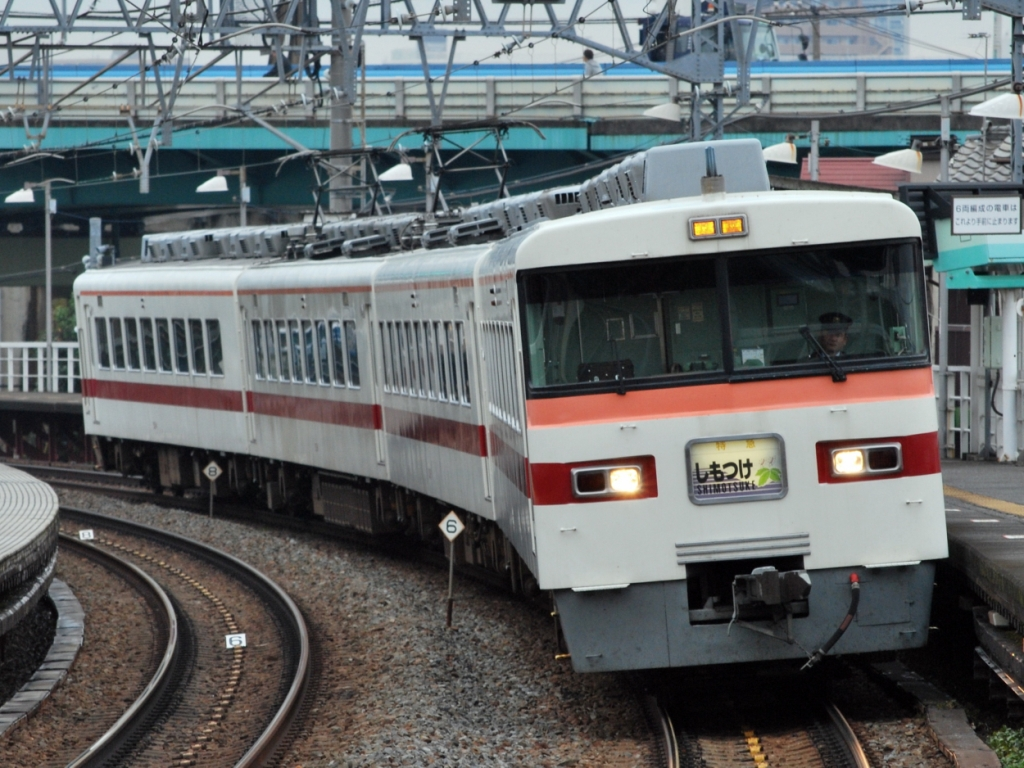
A 4-car 350 series EMU on a Shimotsuke service, December 2008

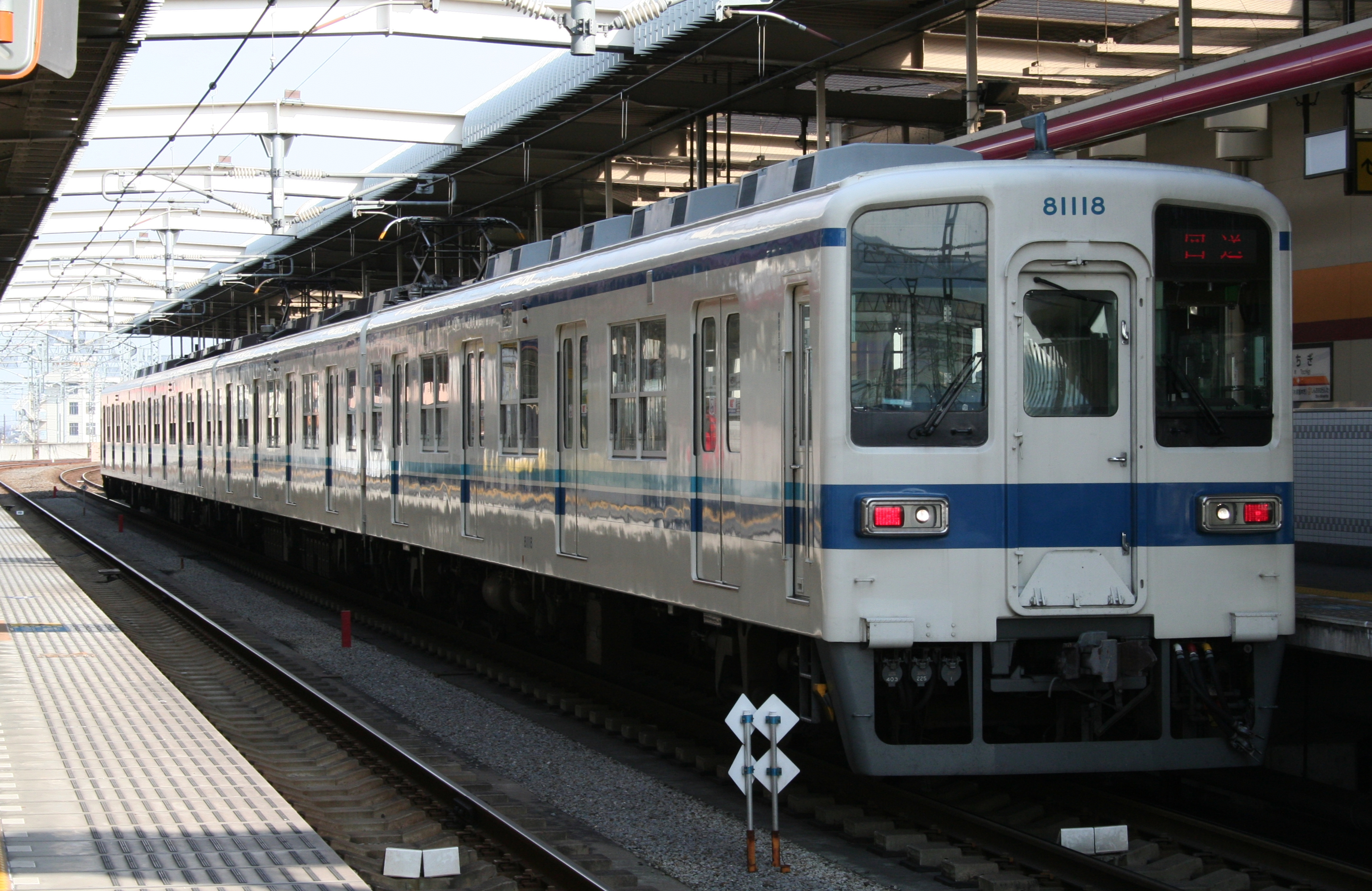
A 4-car 8000 series EMU, February 2015

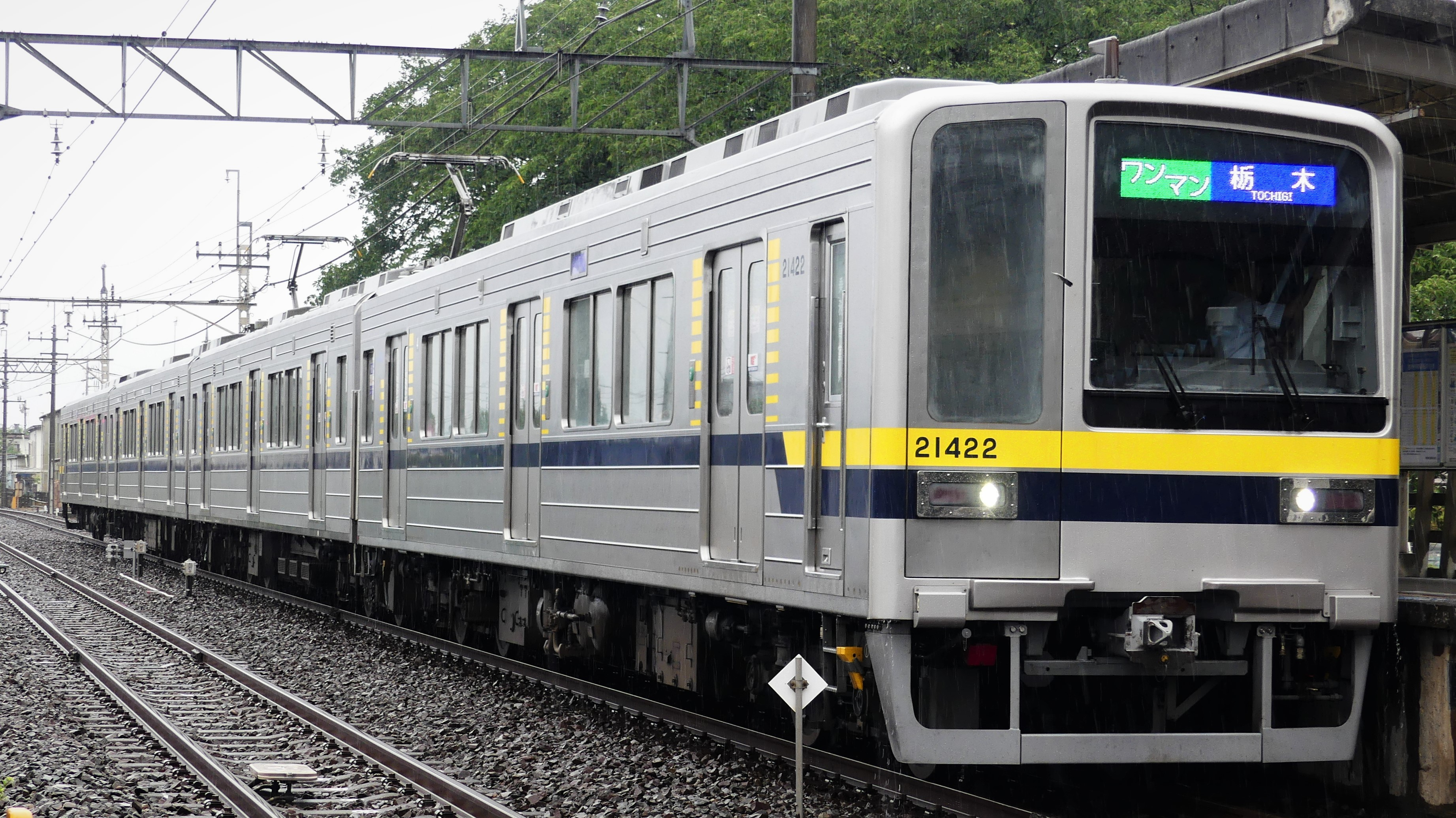
A 4-car 20400 series EMU, June 2019

== History ==
The entire line opened in 1931, electrified at 1,500 V DC.

From 17 March 2012, station numbering was introduced on all Tobu lines, with Tobu Utsunomiya Line stations adopting the prefix "TN" in orange.

== See also ==
- List of railway lines in Japan
