= Tōbu-Utsunomiya Station =

Railway station in Utsunomiya, Tochigi Prefecture, Japan

TN40 Tōbu-Utsunomiya Station 東武宇都宮駅
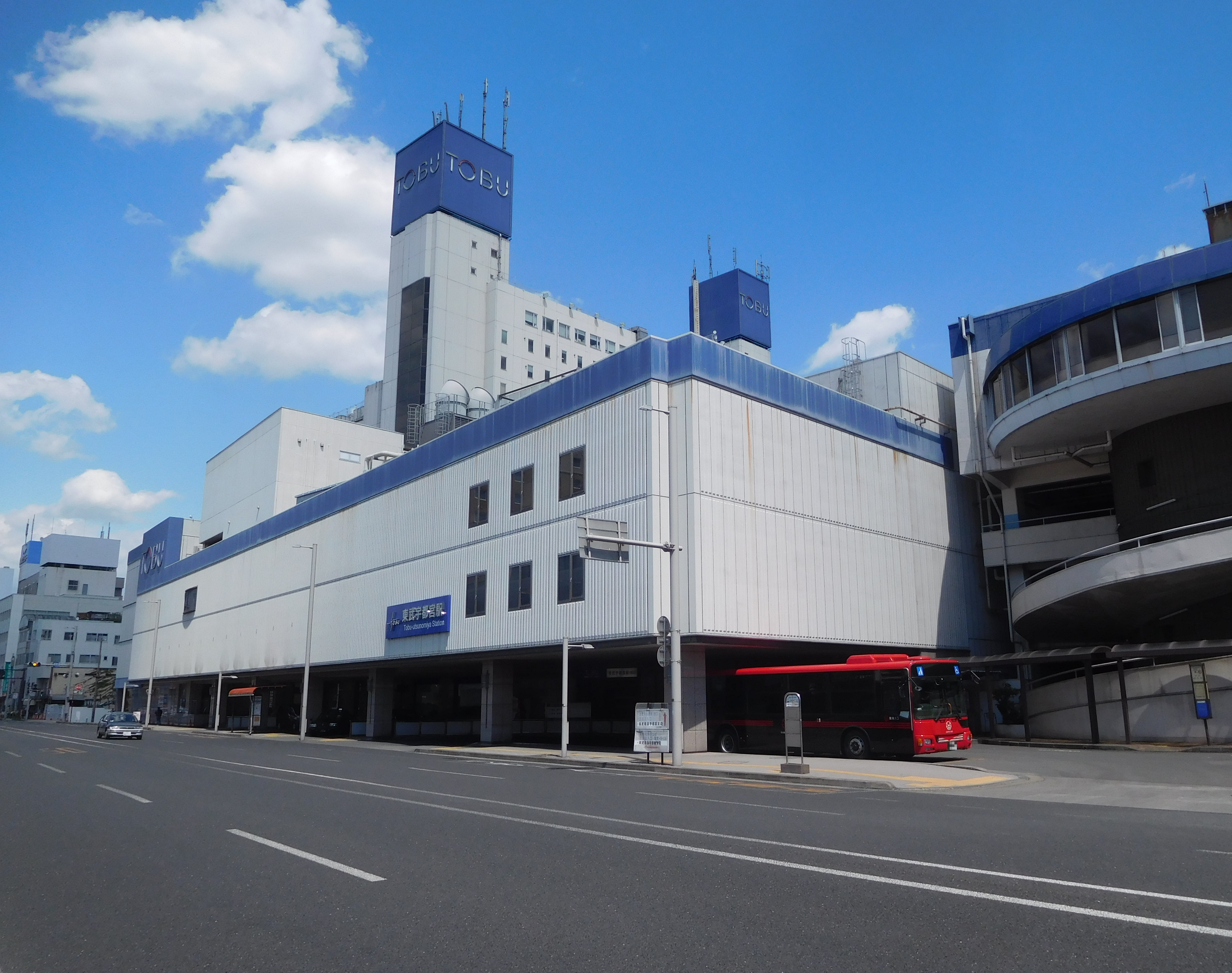
- Tōbu-Utsunomiya Station entrance in April 2020

General information
- Location: 5-4 Miyazono-cho, Utsunomiya-shi, Tochigi-ken 320-0808; Japan
- Coordinates: 36.5590668°N 139.8804027°E
- Operator: Tobu Railway
- Line: ■ Tobu Utsunomiya Line
- Distance: 18.3 km from Shin-Tochigi
- Platforms: 1 bay platform
- Tracks: 2
- Connections: Bus stop

Other information
- Station code: TN-40
- Website: Official website

History
- Opened: 11 August 1931

Passengers
- FY2019: 9604 daily

Services
| Preceding station | Tobu Railway | Following station |
|---|---|---|
| Minami-Utsunomiya TN39 towards Shin-Tochigi | Utsunomiya Line | Terminus |
Location
- Location within Tochigi Prefecture Location within Japan

Tōbu-Utsunomiya Station (東武宇都宮駅, Tōbu-Utsunomiya-eki) is a railway station in the city of Utsunomiya, Tochigi, Japan, operated by the private railway operator Tobu Railway. The station is numbered "TN-40".

== Lines ==
Tōbu-Utsunomiya Station forms the northern terminus of the 24.3 km Tobu Utsunomiya Line from Shin-Tochigi.

== Station layout ==
The station consists of a bay platform located on the second floor ("2F") level, serving two terminating tracks. There is a single storage track on the west side, with no platform.

=== Platforms ===
| 2/3 | ■ Tobu Utsunomiya Line | for Shin-Tochigi |

== History ==
Tobu-Utsunomiya opened on 11 August 1931.

From 17 March 2012, station numbering was introduced on Tobu lines, with Tobu-Utsunomiya Station becoming "TN-40".

== Passenger statistics ==
In fiscal 2019, the station was used by an average of 9604 passengers daily (boarding passengers only).

== Surrounding area ==
The station is located in the same building as the Tobu Department Store in the commercial centre of the city of Utsunomiya. JR East's Utsunomiya Station is located 1.6 km east of the station and connected with this station by frequent bus services.

- Tochigi Prefectural Capital building
- Utsunomiya City Hall
- Utsunomiya Central Post Office
- Site of former Utsunomiya Castle
