= Shin-Tochigi Station =

Railway station in Tochigi, Tochigi Prefecture, Japan

TN12 Shin-Tochigi Station 新栃木駅
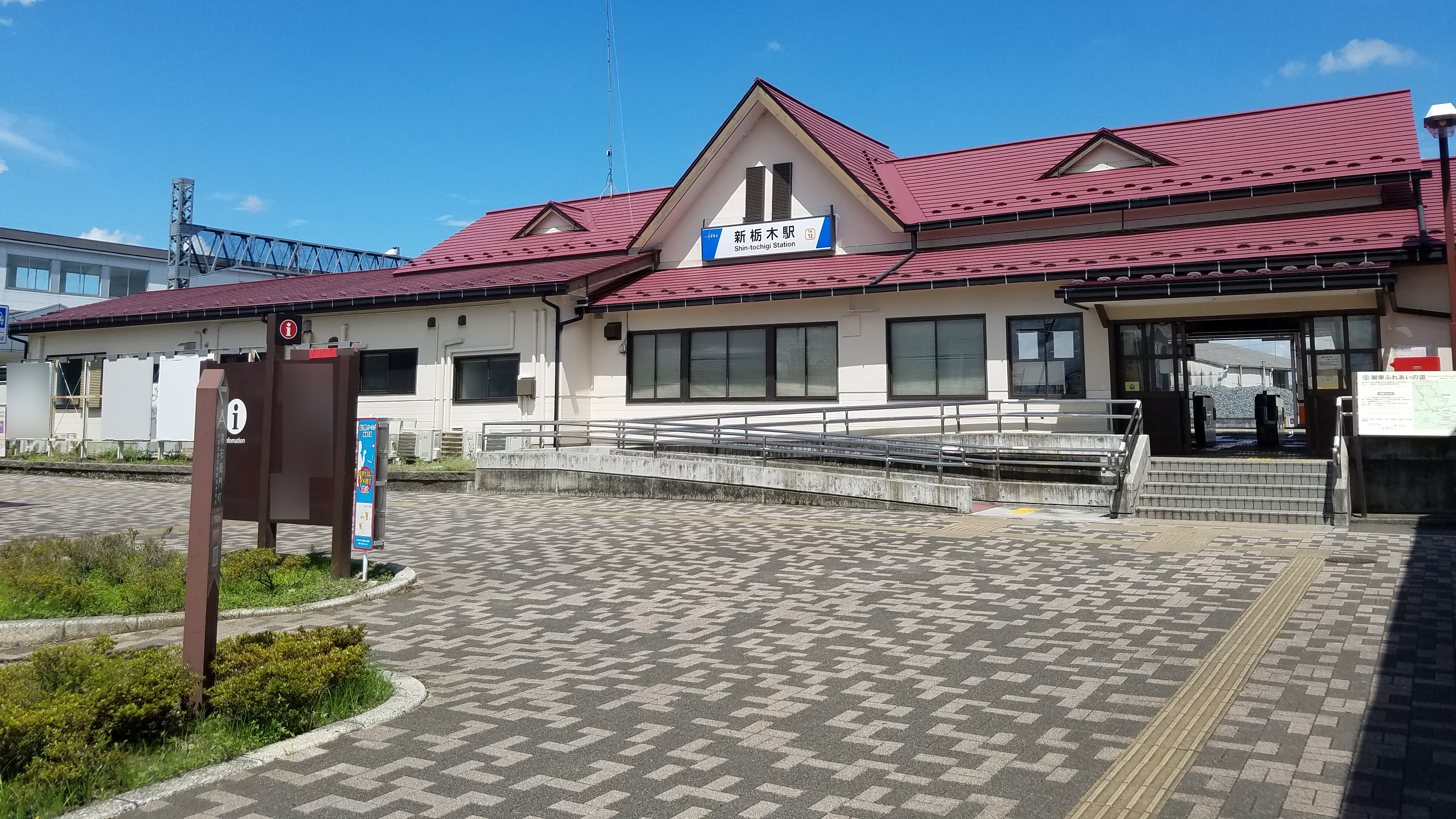
- The station building in August 2021

General information
- Location: 1-8-18 Hirayanagimachi, Tochigi-shi, Tochigi-ken 328-0012; Japan
- Coordinates: 36.3901°N 139.7417°E
- Operator: Tobu Railway
- Lines: Tobu Nikko Line; Tobu Utsunomiya Line
- Distance: 47.9 km from Tōbu-Dōbutsu-Kōen
- Platforms: 1 island + 1 side platform
- Tracks: 3

Other information
- Station code: TN-12
- Website: Official website

History
- Opened: 1 April 1929

Passengers
- FY2019: 4163 daily

Services
Preceding station	Tobu Railway	Following station
Tochigi TN11 towards Minami-Kurihashi	Nikkō Line Express	Shin-Kanuma TN18 towards Tōbu–Nikkō
Tochigi TN11 towards Tōbu-Dōbutsu-Kōen	Nikkō Line Local	Kassemba TN13 towards Tōbu–Nikkō
through to Nikkō Line	Utsunomiya Line	Yashū-Hirakawa TN31 towards Tōbu-Utsunomiya
Location
- Location within Tochigi Prefecture Location within Japan

Shin-Tochigi Station (新栃木駅, Shin Tochigi-eki; lit. "New Tochigi Station") is a junction railway station in the city of Tochigi, Tochigi Prefecture, Japan, operated by the private railway operator Tōbu Railway. The station is numbered "TN-12".

== Lines ==
Shin-Tochigi Station is served by the Tōbu Nikkō Line, and is also a terminal station of the Tōbu Utsunomiya Line. It is located 47.9 km from the starting point of the Tōbu Nikkō Line at Tōbu-Dōbutsu-Kōen and is 24.3 km from the opposing terminus of the Tōbu Utsunomiya Line at Tōbu Utsunomiya

== Station layout ==
This station consists of one side platform and one island platform, connected to the station building by a footbridge.

=== Platforms ===
1	■ Tōbu Nikkō Line	for Tōbu-Nikkō
1	■ Tōbu Utsunomiya Line	for Tobu Utsunomiya
2, 3	■ Tōbu Nikkō Line	for Tochigi and Tōbu-Dōbutsu-Kōen for Tōbu-Nikkō
2, 3	■ Tōbu Utsunomiya Line	for Tobu Utsunomiya

== History ==
Shin-Tochigi Station opened on 1 April 1929.

From 17 March 2012, station numbering was introduced on all Tōbu lines, with Shin-Tochigi Station becoming "TN-12".

== Passenger statistics ==
In fiscal 2019, the station was used by an average of 4163 passengers daily (boarding passengers only).

== Surrounding area ==
- Tochigi Post Office
- Tochigi Fire Department

== See also ==
- List of railway stations in Japan
