= Tochigi Station =

Railway station in Tochigi, Tochigi Prefecture, Japan

TN11 Tochigi Station 栃木駅
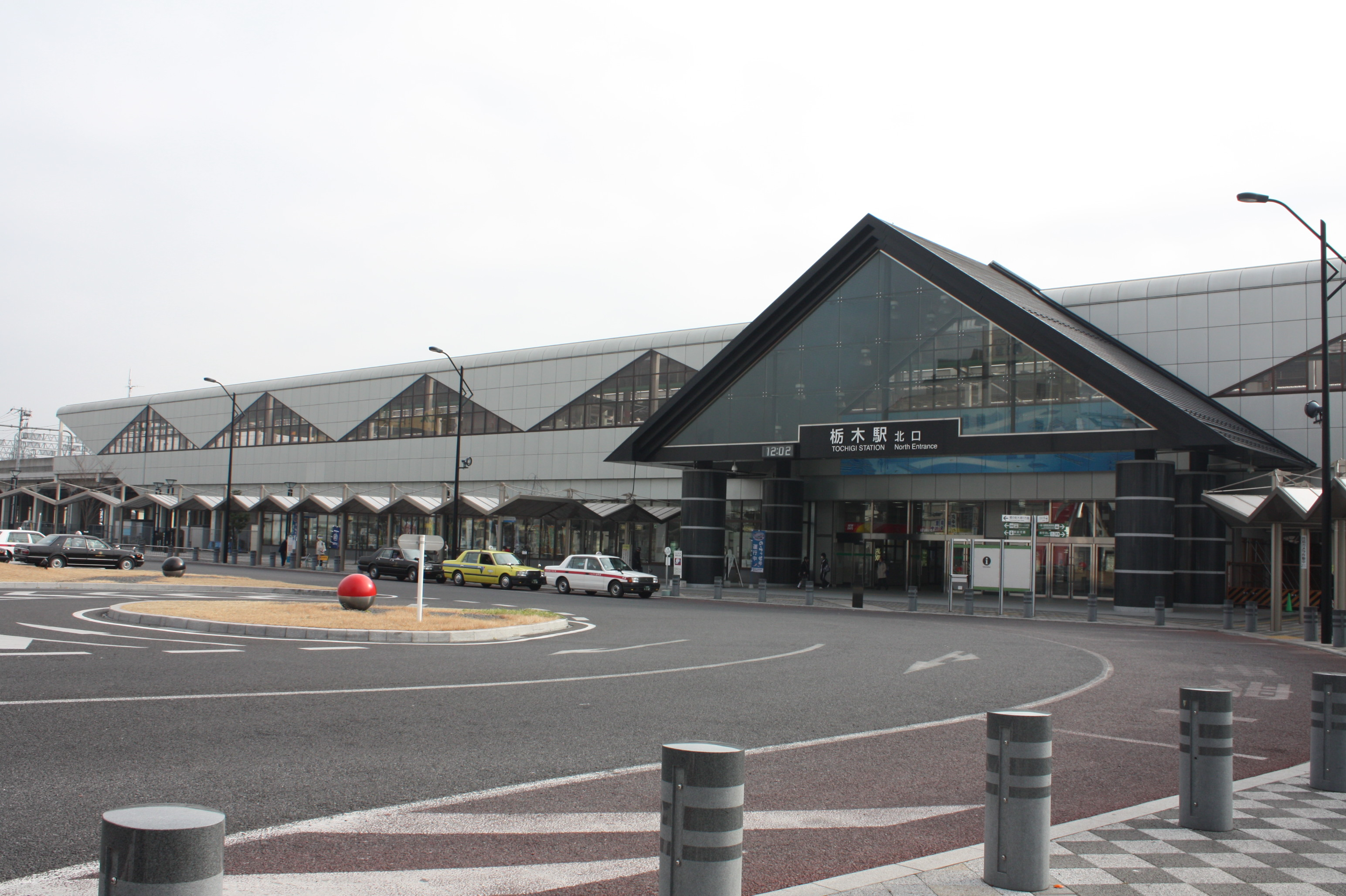
- Tochigi station north entrance in December 2009

General information
- Location: 1-1 / 1-35 Numawada-cho, Tochigi-shi, Tochigi-ken; Japan
- Coordinates: 36.3717°N 139.7312°E
- Operator: JR East; Tobu Railway
- Lines: ■ Ryōmō Line; Tobu Nikko Line
- Distance: 10.8 km from Oyama (JR East); 44.9 km from Tōbu-Dōbutsu-Kōen (Tobu)
- Platforms: 1 island platform (JR East); 1 side + 1 island platform (Tobu)

Other information
- Station code: TN-11 (Tobu)
- Website: Official website (JR East); Official website (Tobu)

History
- Opened: 22 May 1888 (JR East); 1 April 1929 (Tobu)

Passengers
- FY 2019: 4,857 daily (JR East); 11,449 daily (Tobu)

Services
Preceding station	JR East	Following station
Ōhirashita towards Takasaki	Ryōmō Line	Omoigawa towards Oyama
Preceding station	Tobu Railway	Following station
Ōmiya towards Shinjuku	Nikkō and Kinugawa	Shin-Kanuma TN18 towards Tōbu–Nikkō or Kinugawa–Onsen
Kasukabe TS27 towards Asakusa	Spacia X	Shin-Kanuma TN18 towards Tōbu–Nikkō or Kinugawa–Onsen
Minami-Kurihashi TN03 towards Asakusa	Kegon	Shin-Kanuma TN18 towards Tōbu–Nikkō
Kasukabe TS27 towards Asakusa	Kinu	Shin-Kanuma TN18 towards Kinugawa–Onsen
Kasukabe TS27 towards Asakusa	Aizu	Shin-Kanuma TN18 towards Shin-Fujiwara
Shin-Ōhirashita TN10 towards Minami-Kurihashi	Nikkō Line Express	Shin-Tochigi TN12 towards Tōbu–Nikkō
Shin-Ōhirashita TN10 towards Tōbu-Dōbutsu-Kōen	Nikkō Line Local	Shin-Tochigi TN12 towards Tōbu–Nikkō
Location
- Location within Tochigi Prefecture Location within Japan

Tochigi Station (栃木駅, Tochigi-eki) is a railway station in the city of Tochigi, Tochigi Prefecture. Japan, operated jointly by the East Japan Railway Company (JR East) and the private railway operator Tobu Railway.

== Lines ==
Tochigi Station is served by the Tōbu Nikkō Line, and is 44.3 km from the starting point of the Nikko Line at Tōbu-Dōbutsu-Kōen. It is also a station on the JR East Ryōmō Line and is 10.8 km from the starting point of that line at Oyama Station.

== Station layout ==
=== JR East station ===
The JR East station consists of one island platform serving two tracks, connected to the station building by a footbridge.

1	■ Ryōmō Line	for Oyama
2	■ Ryōmō Line	for Sano, Maebashi, and Takasaki

=== Tobu Railway station ===
The Tobu Station consists of one elevated side platform and one elevated island platform serving three tracks, with the station building located underneath.

=== Platforms ===
1	■ Tobu Nikko Line	for Minami-Kurihashi and Tōbu-Dōbutsu-Kōen; Tobu Skytree Line for Kasukabe, Kita-Senju, and Asakusa
2-3	■ Tobu Nikko Line	for Shin-Tochigi and Tōbu Nikkō

== History ==
The JR East Ryōmō Line station opened on 22 May 1888. The Tōbu station opened on 1 April 1929. It was rebuilt as an elevated station on 17 May 2000.

From 17 March 2012, station numbering was introduced on all Tobu lines, with Tochigi Station becoming "TN-11".

== Passenger statistics ==
In fiscal 2019, the Tobu station was used by an average of 11,449 passengers daily. The JR East station was used by 4,857 passengers (alighting) daily.

== Surrounding area ==
- Tochigi city center
- Tochigi City Hall

== Bus routes ==
- THS
  - For Sano Shintoshi Bus Terminal

== See also ==
- List of railway stations in Japan
