= Your Own Quiz =

2022 novel and its adapations

- Cover page of the novel

君のクイズ (Kimi no Kuizu)
- Genre: Mystery
- Novel
- Written by: Satoshi Ogawa
- Published by: Asahi Shimbun Publication
- Published: October 7, 2022
- Manga
- Written by: Satoshi Ogawa
- Illustrated by: Ayako Noda
- Published by: Shodensha
- Imprint: Our Feel Comics
- Magazine: Our Feel
- Original run: April 3, 2025 – present
- Volumes: 1
- Live-action film
- Directed by: Kohei Yoshino
- Produced by: Takuro Owaki; Toyo Yato; Seiichi Tanaka
- Written by: Okazaki Satoko; Kohei Yoshino
- Music by: Yaffle; Tatsuhiko Saiki
- Studio: Django Films
- Released: May 15, 2026
- Runtime: 118 minutes
- Other
- Your Own Quiz stage play (2025)
- icon

Your Own Quiz (Japanese: 君のクイズ, Hepburn: Kimi no Kuizu) is a Japanese mystery novel written by Satoshi Ogawa. It was published by Asahi Shimbun Publication in October 2022. The novel won the 76th Mystery Writers of Japan Award for Best Novel and Short Story.

The novel received a manga and stage play adaptation in April 2025. A live-action film adaptation premiered in May 2026.

== Plot ==
Reo Mishima, who has advanced to the finals of the live quiz show Q-1 Grand Prix, is on the verge of winning the one-on-one buzzer quiz, in which the first to answer seven questions correctly wins. Three incorrect answers result in elimination. However, in the final moments, his opponent, Kizuna Honjō, presses the button before a single word of the question is even read, inexplicably guessing the correct answer, resulting in Mishima's defeat.

== Characters ==
Reo Mishima (三島玲央, Mishima Reo)
Portrayed by: Takumi Kitagawa (stage play), Tomoya Nakamura (film)
Kizuna Honjō (本庄絆, Honjō Kizuna)
Portrayed by: Shosei Oda (stage play), Ryunosuke Kamiki (film)

== Media ==
=== Novel ===
According to the author Satoshi Ogawa, he wanted to create a sports novel, but said that the "physical movements and beauty of the sport are lost" when you turn sports into a novel. The novel was inspired by Takushi Izawa after Ogawa was hooked by the videos of QuizKnock. He wanted to create the quiz-related novel since around 2019, but started writing the novel around February of 2022 and finished the draft before the deadline in April. The quiz part was created by his friend Tamura Masashi. According to Ogawa, he chose to create a quiz-related novel because it is easy to adapt into a novel, as quizzes are made out of words themselves, and he wanted to express the speed and tension of quiz competitions like those in sports through a novel. He also included the question and answer in the novel so that the readers can also answer the quiz in the novel, adding that he wanted the readers to answer at least one question correctly before or at the same time as the main protagonist.

Your Own Quiz was published on October 7, 2022, by the Asahi Shimbun Publication. A bunkobon edition was released on April 25, 2025.

==== Publications ====
- October 7, 2022: Your Own Quiz – ISBN 978-4-02-251837-8, Asahi Shimbun Publication
- April 22, 2025: Your Own Quiz (bunkobon) – ISBN 978-4-02-265193-8, Asahi Shimbun Publication

=== Stage play ===
A stage play adaptation starring Takumi Kitagawa and Shosei Oda was performed at IMM Theater in Tokyo from April 3 to 20, and at Cool Japan Park Osaka TT Hall in Osaka from April 25 to 27, 2025. Yoko Oike is in charge of the script, and Kensaku Kobayashi is in charge of direction.

=== Manga ===
A manga adaptation of the novel illustrated by Ayako Noda began serialization on the Feel Young's Our Feel manga website on April 3, 2025. The first tankōbon volume was released on May 1, 2026.

==== Volumes ====
No.	Release date	ISBN
1	May 1, 2026	978-4-86846-016-9

=== Live-action film ===
A live-action film adaptation was announced on October 21, 2025. The film stars Tomoya Nakamura as Reo Mishima and Ryunosuke Kamiki as Kizuna Honjō. It was directed by Kohei Yoshino. Okazaki Satoko and Kohei Yoshino were in charge of the script, while Takuro Owaki, Toyo Yato, and Seiichi Tanaka produced the film. The music was provided by Yaffle and Tatsuhiko Saiki. The quiz part of the movie was supervised by QuizKnock member Takushi Izawa, who also made a cameo in the film, as well as Fukura P and Yoshiaki Yamamoto. It premiered on May 15, 2026. Django Film produced the film. It was distributed by Toho Co., Ltd.

== Reception ==
By May 2023, the novel had sold over 130,000 copies; by October 2025, it had sold over 260,000 copies and had become a bestseller. By May 2026, e-book, bunkobon and tankōbon versions of the novel had sold over 410,000 copies.

The novel ranked seventh in the Kono Mystery ga Sugoi! guide book published by Takarajimasha for the 2024. Following the premiere of the film adaptation, it ranked 11th on Billboard Japan's weekly Book Hot 100 ranking released on May 21, 2026. Before peaking at 10th place on May 28.

Shiro of Hidaka Shimpo praised the novel as "certainly interesting," including the depiction of quizzing. Mystery author Kōtarō Isaka praised it immediately after its release, saying, "It's too interesting!! It's been a long time since I've encountered such an exciting mystery, and it's the best mystery ever," and television producer Sakuma Nobuyuki praised the novel adding "Once you open the book, you're done."

The film ranked sixth in the national box office rankings on its opening week. Taniguchi Ryuichi of Real Sound praised the movie adding that the cast are perfect to the movie, he also praised Tomoya Nakamura and Ryunosuke Kamiki's performance in the movie.

== Accolades ==
Awards and nominations for Your Own Quiz
Ceremony	Year	Award/Category	Recipient	Result	Ref.
76th Mystery Writers of Japan Award	2023	Best Novel	Your Own Quiz (novel)	Won	
76th Mystery Writers of Japan Award	2023	Best Short Story	Your Own Quiz (novel)	Won	
Japan Booksellers' Award	2023	Japan Booksellers' Award	Your Own Quiz (novel)	6th place	

== See also ==
- Japanese variety show
- Game show

== Further readings ==
- 【映画『君のクイズ』公開記念】「問題――」クイズ番組の優勝者はなぜ“ゼロ文字正答”できたのか？ / 原作試し読み [[In commemoration of the release of the movie "Your Own Quiz"] "Question—" How was the winner of the quiz show able to give a "zero-character correct answer"? / Sample reading of the original work]. Aera (in Japanese). May 18, 2026.
