= Takuya Kawamura (internet personality) =

Japanese quiz player (born 1993)

- Kawamura Takuya (河村拓哉)
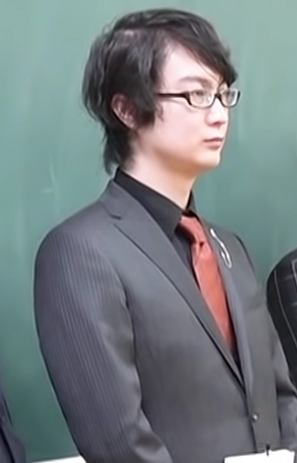
- Kawamura in 2023
- Born: December 20, 1993 (age 32); Kanuma, Tochigi, Japan
- Education: Tokyo University
- Occupations: Quiz player, television writer and personality, YouTuber
- Years active: 2016 – present
- Employer: QuizKnock
- Agent: Watanabe Entertainment
- Spouse: Shinohara Kaori (m. 2024)
- Children: 1

Takuya Kawamura (Japanese: 河村拓哉, Hepburn: Kawamura Takuya; December 20, 1993) is a Japanese quiz player, writer, television personality and member of the YouTube and media group QuizKnock.

== Biography ==
Kawamura was born on December 20, 1993, in Kanuma, Tochigi. He later moved to Saitama Prefecture and back to Mashiko, Tochigi when he was in second grade in elementary school. He later moved back to Kanuma after finishing fifth grade. He graduated from Utsunomiya Middle School and High School. In his third year in high school, he joined the trial session of Tokyo University's quiz club. He entered Tokyo University's Faculty of Science in 2012, where he joined the university quiz club. Later, he was asked by Takushi Izawa to join QuizKnock upon launching in 2017. He joined the group and took charge of planning the videos, writing the quiz questions for both the videos and articles on their website, as well as appearing in the group's video. He debuted on television in February 2019 at TV Asahi's 100,000-en Dekiru Kana as a guest and appearing in various television shows as guest. Starting in 2022, he served as the chairman and host of the quiz competition "WHAT" for high school students. His fans have given him the nickname "God" (神, Kami).

== Personal life ==
Before joining QuizKnock, he said that he wanted to become a programmer or a novelist. He met his now wife and fellow television personality Shinohara Kaori in the University of Tokyo quiz club. Kawamura announced that he would be getting married in July 2022 on a quiz-style game of Werewolf—a card game—in a video of him and other members playing it; the video was uploaded to the "QuizKnock" channel and became number 1 on YouTube trending in Japan. They got married in February 2024 and announced the birth of their first child in the same year.

== Bibliography ==
- 100 Trivia and Chat Quizzes (雑学×雑談 勝負クイズ100) (2023), Bungeishunjū - Along with his wife.
- No Map, No Destination, But Not Lost (地図はない、目的地もない、でも迷子ではない) (2026), NHK Publishing - along with his wife.
