= Kuriyama, Tochigi =

Dissolved municipality in Tochigi prefecture, Japan

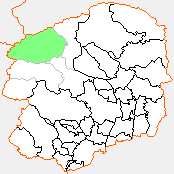
Map of Kuriyama, Tochigi

Kuriyama (栗山村, Kuriyama-mura) was a village located in Shioya District, Tochigi Prefecture, Japan.

As of 2003, the village had an estimated population of 2,068 and a density of 4.84 persons per km^{2}. The total area was 427.37 km^{2}.

On March 20, 2006, Kuriyama, along with the city of Imaichi, the town of Ashio (from Kamitsuga District), and the town of Fujihara (also from Shioya District), was merged into the expanded city of Nikkō. As a result of the merger, no villages remain in Tochigi Prefecture.
