= Kita-Kanuma Station =

Railway station in Kanuma, Tochigi Prefecture, Japan

TN19 Kita-Kanuma Station 北鹿沼駅
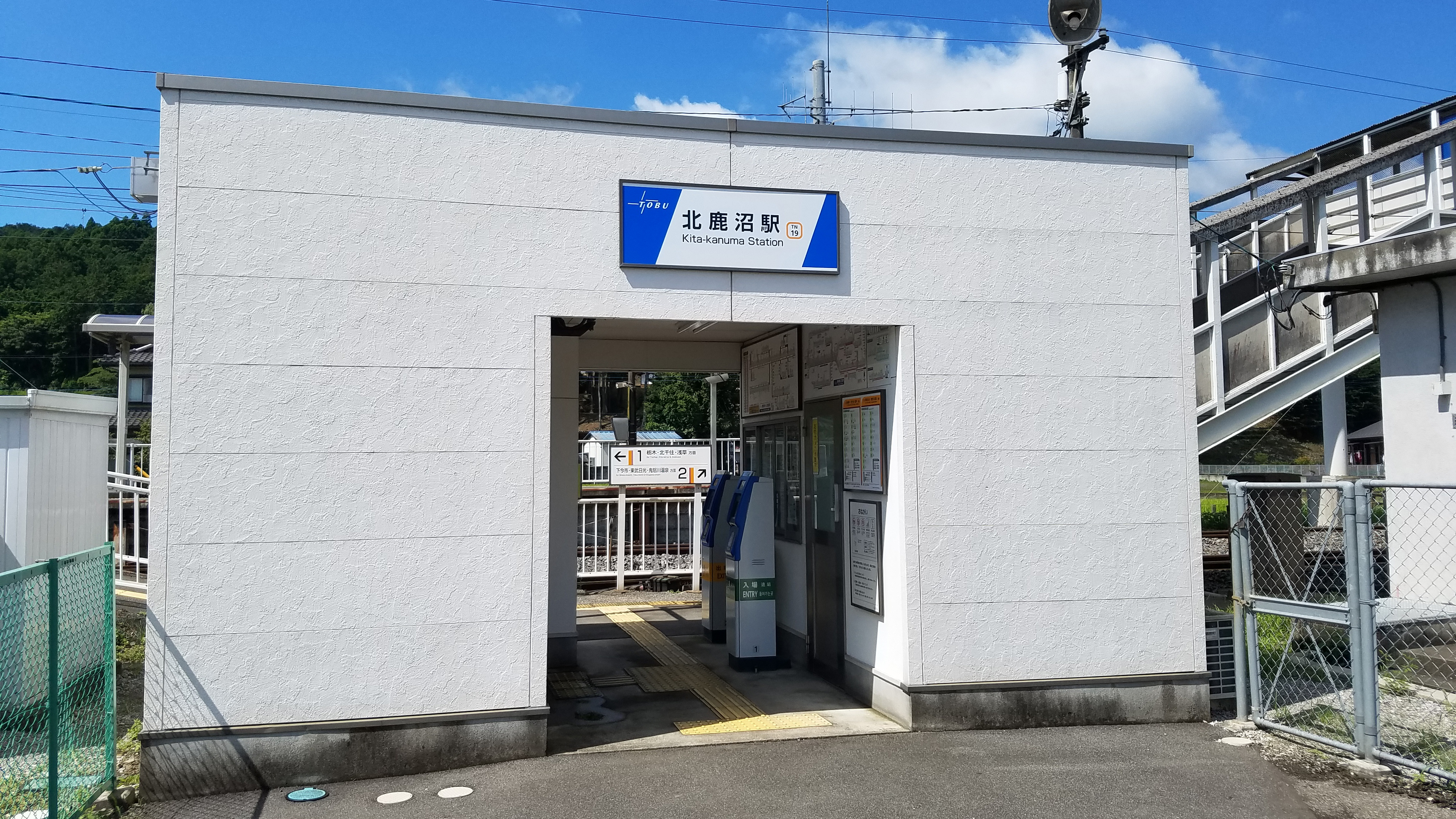
- Kita-Kanuma Station in August 2021

General information
- Location: 724 Tamada-machi, Kanuma-shi, Tochigi-ken 322-0072; Japan
- Coordinates: 36.5806°N 139.7375°E
- Operator: Tobu Railway
- Line: Tobu Nikko Line
- Distance: 69.8 km from Tōbu-Dōbutsu-Kōen
- Platforms: 2 side platforms
- Tracks: 2

Other information
- Station code: TN-19
- Website: Official website

History
- Opened: 10 December 1931

Passengers
- FY2020: 185 daily

Services
Preceding station	Tobu Railway	Following station
Shin-Kanuma TN18 towards Tōbu-Dōbutsu-Kōen	Nikkō Line Local	Itaga TN20 towards Tōbu–Nikkō
Location
- Location within Tochigi Prefecture Location within Japan

Kita-Kanuma Station (北鹿沼駅, Kita-Kanuma-eki) is a railway station in the city of Kanuma, Tochigi, Japan, operated by the private railway operator Tobu Railway. The station is numbered "TN-19".

== Lines ==
Kita-Kanuma Station is served by the Tobu Nikko Line, and is 69.8 km from the starting point of the line at Tōbu-Dōbutsu-Kōen.

== Station layout ==
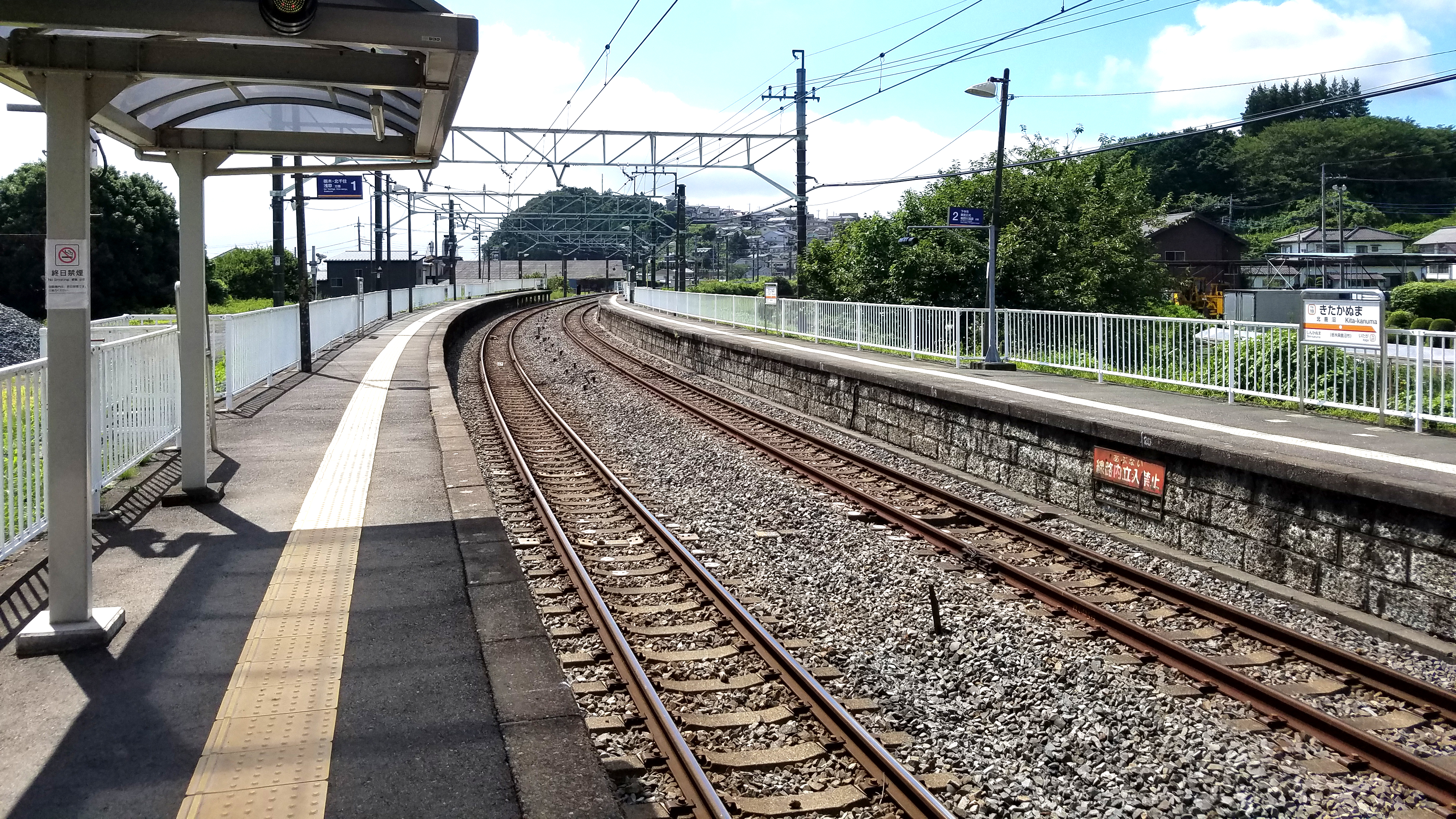
Kita-Kanuma station platforms in August 2021

The station has two opposed side platforms serving two tracks. The platforms are linked by a footbridge.

=== Platforms ===
1	■ Tobu Nikko Line	for Shin-Tochigi and Tōbu-Dōbutsu-Kōen
2	■ Tobu Nikko Line	for Tōbu-Nikkō

== History ==
Kita-Kanuma Station opened on 10 December 1931. It became unstaffed from 1 September 1973.

From 17 March 2012, station numbering was introduced on all Tobu lines, with Kita-Kanuma Station becoming "TN-19".

== Passenger statistics ==
In fiscal 2019, the station was used by an average of 185 passengers daily (boarding passengers only).

== Surrounding area ==
- National Route 293
- National Route 352
- Kanuma Cultural Center

== See also ==
- List of railway stations in Japan
