= Shimo-Goshiro Station =

Railway station in Nikkō, Tochigi Prefecture, Japan

TN21 Shimo-goshiro Station 下小代駅
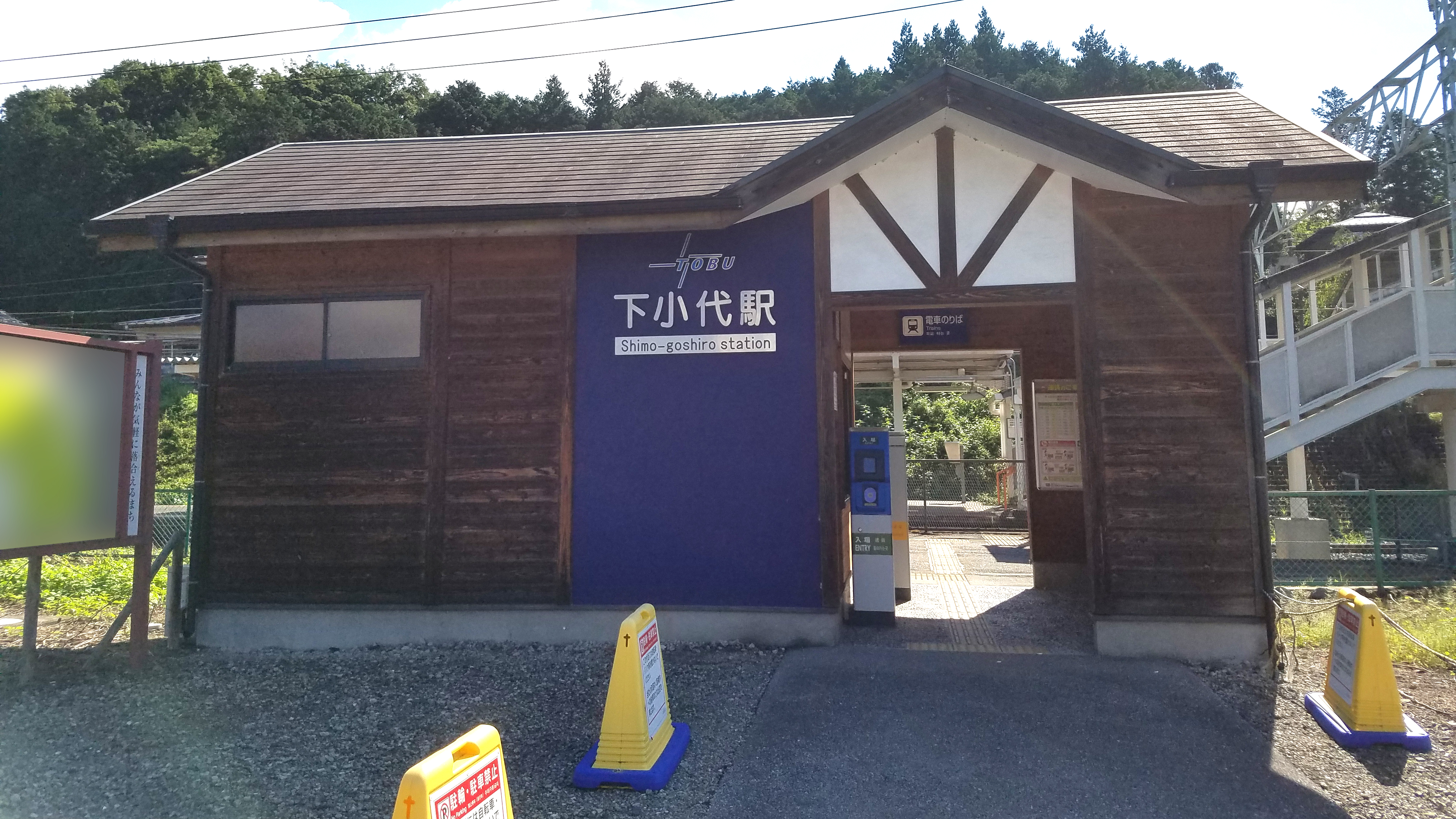
- Shimo-goshiro Station entrance in August 2021

General information
- Location: 329 Goshiro, Nikkō-shi, Tochigi-ken 321-1107; Japan
- Coordinates: 36.6516°N 139.7139°E
- Operator: Tobu Railway
- Line: Tobu Nikko Line
- Distance: 78.5 km from Tōbu-Dōbutsu-Kōen
- Platforms: 1 island platform

Other information
- Station code: TN-21
- Website: Official website

History
- Opened: 7 July 1929

Passengers
- FY2020: 190 daily

Services
Preceding station	Tobu Railway	Following station
Itaga TN20 towards Tōbu-Dōbutsu-Kōen	Nikkō Line Local	Myōjin TN22 towards Tōbu–Nikkō
Location
- Location within Tochigi Prefecture Location within Japan

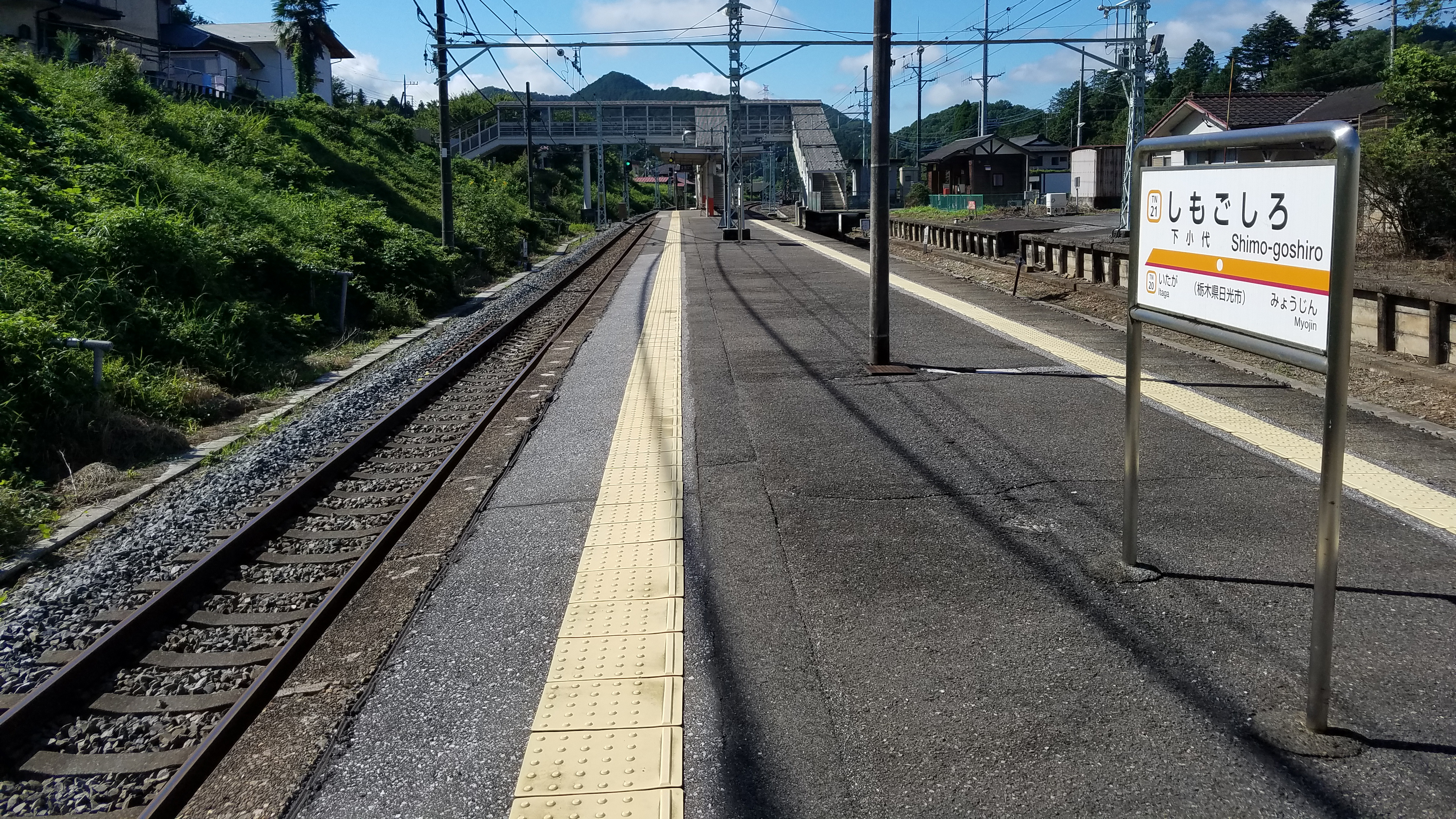
Shimo-goshiro station platform in August 2021

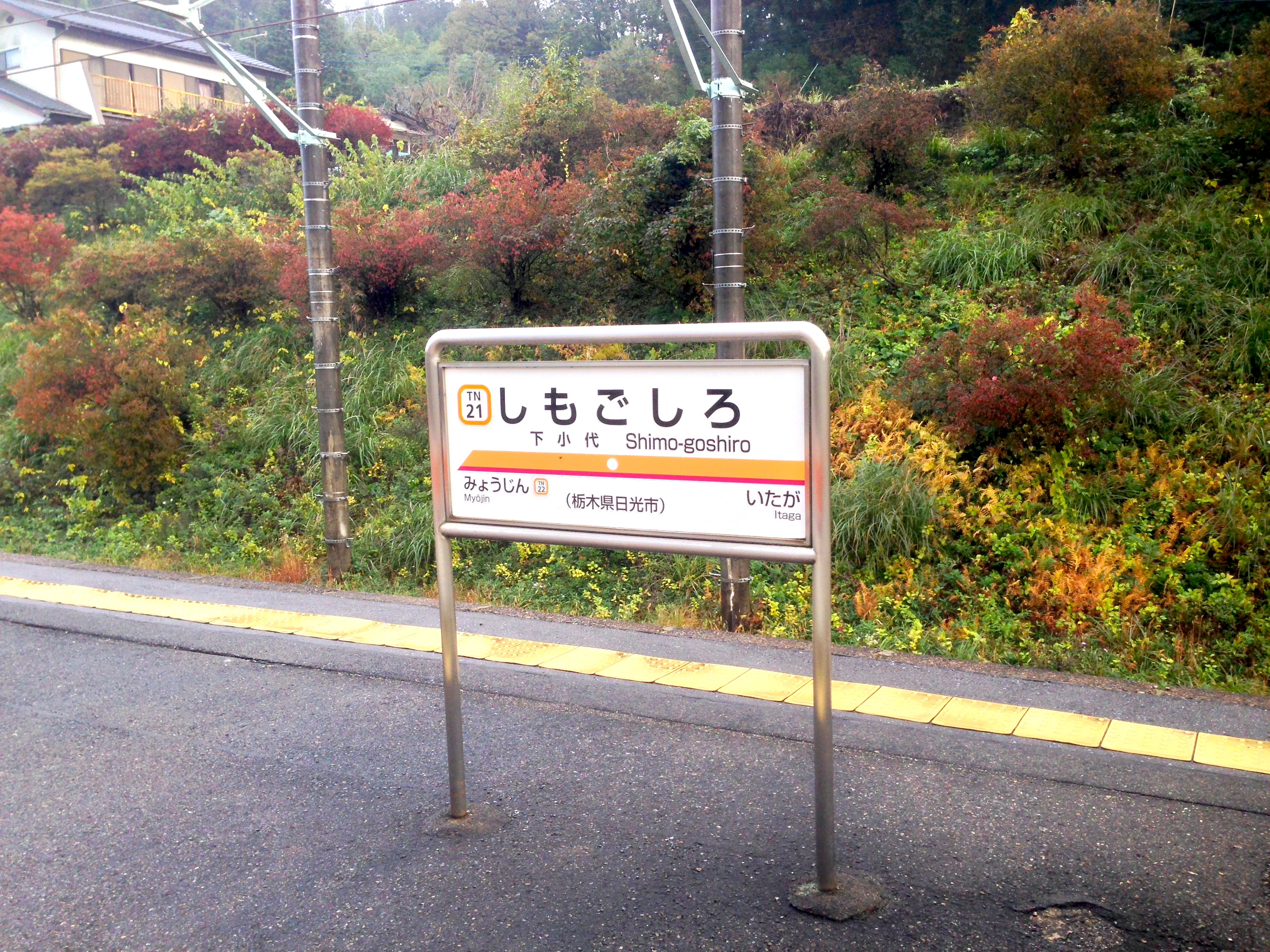
Shimo-goshiro Station platform sign, November 2013

Shimo-goshiro Station (下小代駅, Shimo-goshiro-eki) is a railway station in the city of Nikkō, Tochigi, Japan, operated by the private railway operator Tobu Railway. The station is numbered "TN-21".

== Lines ==
Shimo-goshiro Station is served by the Tobu Nikko Line, and is 78.5 km from the starting point of the line at Tōbu-Dōbutsu-Kōen.

== Station layout ==
The station is unstaffed with a single island platform connected to the station entrance by a footbridge.

=== Platforms ===
1	■ Tobu Nikko Line	for Tōbu-Nikkō
2	■ Tobu Nikko Line	for Shin-Tochigi and Tōbu-Dōbutsu-Kōen

== History ==
Shimo-goshiro Station opened on 7 July 1929. It became unstaffed from 1 September 1973. A new station building was completed in 2007.

From 17 March 2012, station numbering was introduced on all Tobu lines, with Shimo-goshiro Station becoming "TN-21".

== Passenger statistics ==
In fiscal 2019, the station was used by an average of 190 passengers daily (boarding passengers only).

== Surrounding area ==
- Goshiro Middle School

== See also ==
- List of railway stations in Japan
