= Ashio, Tochigi =

Dissolved municipality in Tochigi prefecture, Japan

Coordinates: 36°38′N 139°27′E

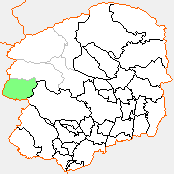
Map of Ashio, Tochigi

Ashio (足尾町, Ashio-machi) was a town located in Kamitsuga District, Tochigi, Japan.

As of 2003, the town had an estimated population of 3,465 and a density of 18.65 persons per km^{2}. The total area was 185.79 km^{2}.

On March 20, 2006, Ashio, along with the city of Imaichi, the town of Fujihara, and the village of Kuriyama (both from Shioya District), was merged into the expanded city of Nikkō.

The Ashio Copper Mine was located in Ashio. This copper mine caused a major pollution problem in Japan at the beginning of the 20th century. Subsequent environmental problems related to the mine are still evident along the river, in Tochigi, Gunma and Ibaraki Prefectures. In 1907 the Ashio miners rioted. During World War II a POW camp was based here to supply slave labour to the copper mines.

The following communities agreed to seek the permission of the governor of the prefecture to merge on March 1, 2006:

- Nikkō
- Imaichi
- Ashio
- Fujihara
- Kuriyama
