= Kanuma, Tochigi =

Kanuma 鹿沼市
- City
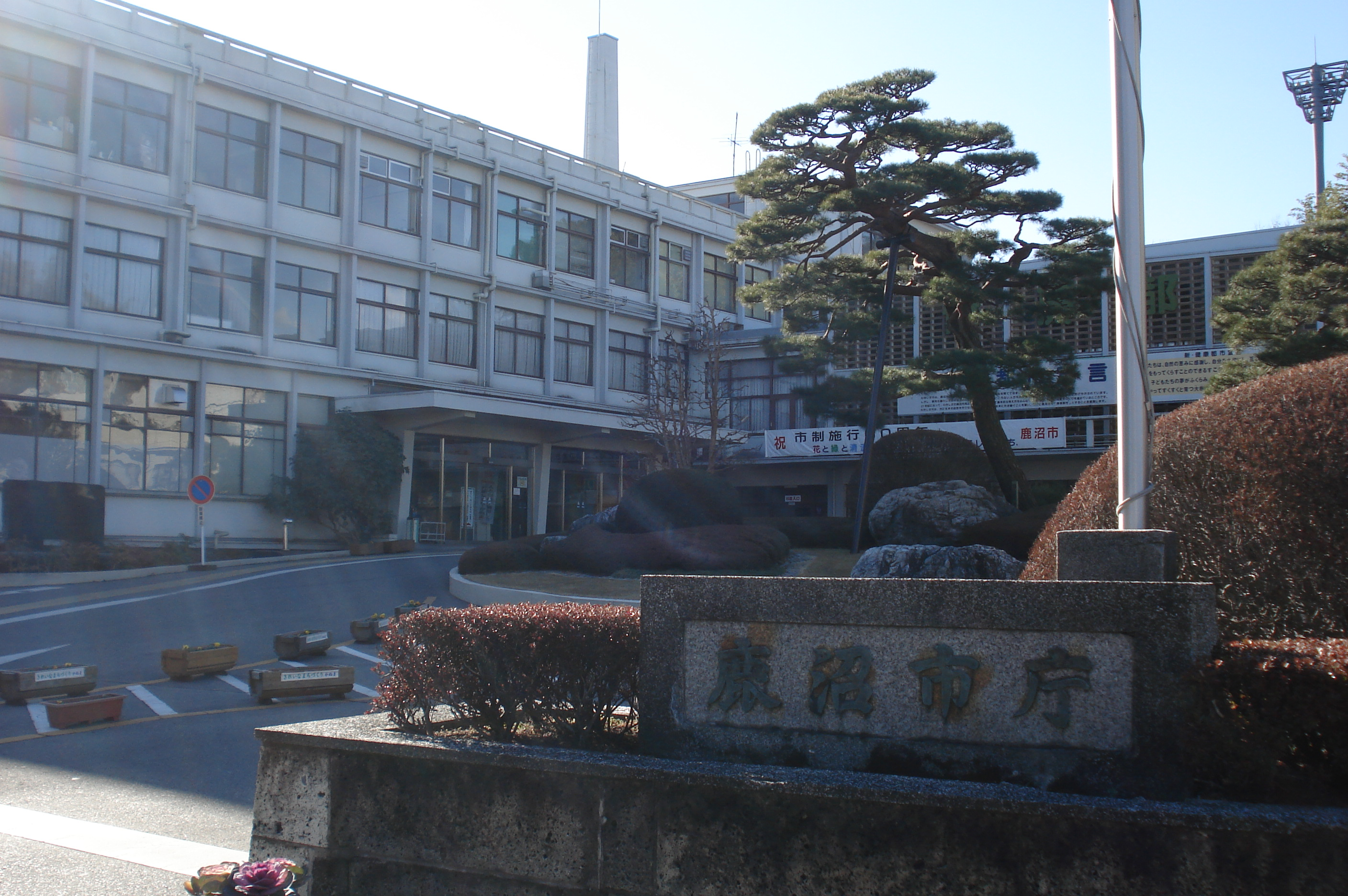
- Kanuma City Hall

- Flag Seal

- Location of Kanuma in Tochigi Prefecture

- Coordinates: 36°34′1.5″N 139°44′42.2″E
- Country: Japan
- Region: Kantō
- Prefecture: Tochigi
- First official recorded: 710 AD
- City settled: October 10, 1948

Government
  - Mayor: Shōichi Matsui (from June 2008)

Area
  - Total: 490.64 km^{2} (189.44 sq mi)

Population (August 2020)
  - Total: 94,926
  - Density: 193.47/km^{2} (501.09/sq mi)
- Time zone: UTC+9 (Japan Standard Time)
- Phone number: 0289-64-2111
- Address: 1688-1 Imamiyachō, Kanuma-shi, Tochigi-ken 322-0068
- Climate: Cfa
- Website: Official website
- Symbols
- Flower: Satsuki azalea
- Tree: Cryptomeria

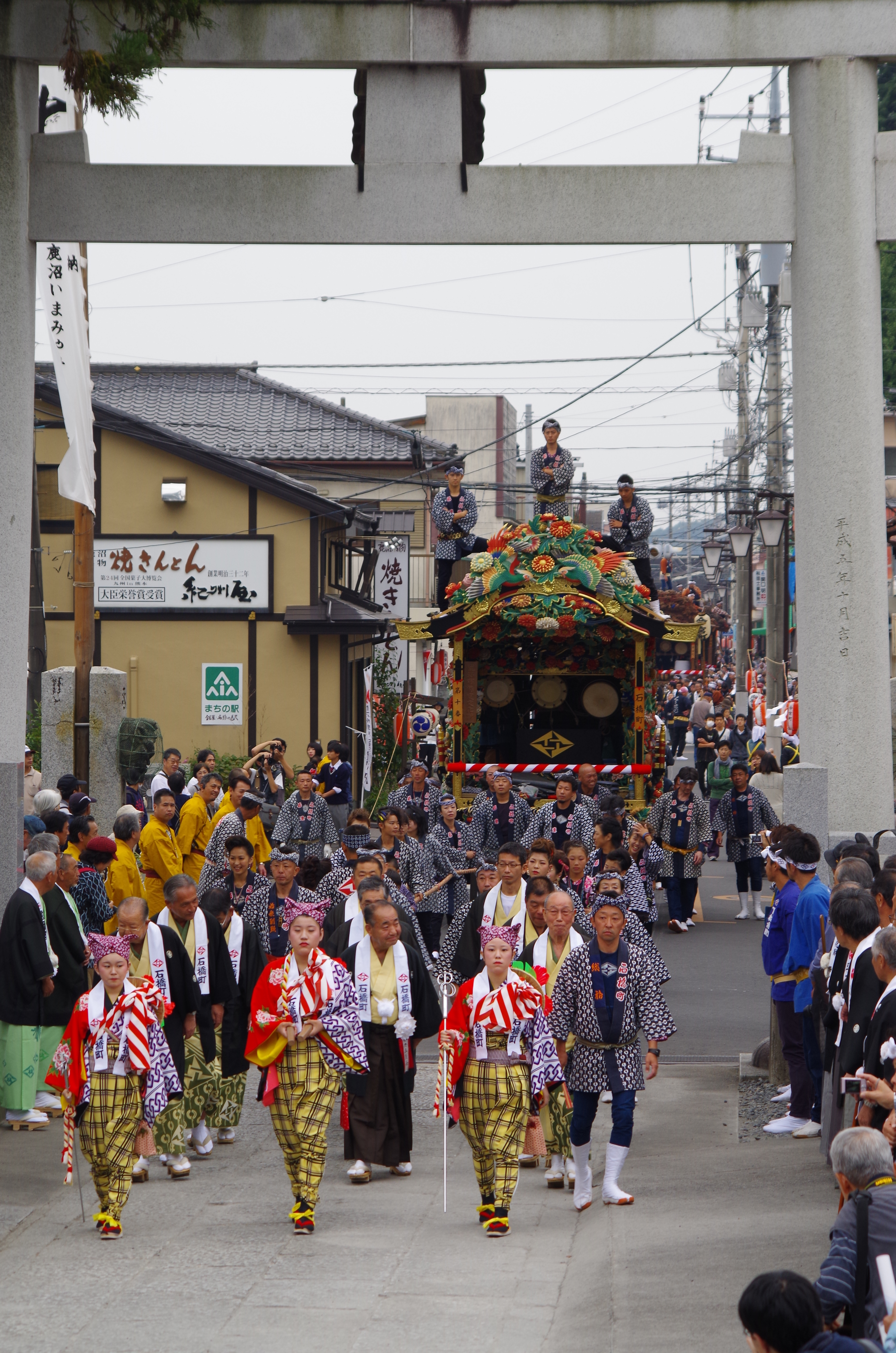
Imamiya Shrine Festival

Kanuma (鹿沼市, Kanuma-shi) is a city located in Tochigi Prefecture, Japan. As of 1 August 2020, the city had an estimated population of 94,926 in 36,795 households, and a population density of 190 persons per km^{2}. The total area of the town is 490.64 km^{2} (189.44 sq mi).

== Geography ==
Kanuma is located in the central area of Tochigi Prefecture. The city is located in the northern part of the Kanto region. The western half of the city area is occupied by the Ashio Mountains, and the eastern half, by a diluvial plateau called Kanuma Plateau. The city is bordered by the prefectural capital of Utsunomiya to the east.

=== Surrounding municipalities ===
Gunma Prefecture

- Midori

Tochigi Prefecture

- Mibu
- Nikko
- Sano
- Tochigi
- Utsunomiya

=== Climate ===
Kanuma has a humid subtropical climate (Köppen Cfa) characterized by warm summers and cold winters with heavy snowfall. The average annual temperature in Kanuma is 13.1 °C (55.6 °F). The average annual rainfall is 1,677.2 mm (66.03 in) with September as the wettest month. The temperatures are highest on average in August, at around 24.9 °C (76.8 °F), and lowest in January, at around 1.5 °C (34.7 °F).

Climate data for Kanuma (1991−2020 normals, extremes 1978−present)
Month	Jan	Feb	Mar	Apr	May	Jun	Jul	Aug	Sep	Oct	Nov	Dec	Year
Record high °C (°F)	17.0 (62.6)	21.6 (70.9)	26.2 (79.2)	29.5 (85.1)	34.0 (93.2)	37.0 (98.6)	37.0 (98.6)	37.1 (98.8)	35.6 (96.1)	32.6 (90.7)	24.3 (75.7)	23.2 (73.8)	37.1 (98.8)
Mean daily maximum °C (°F)	8.1 (46.6)	9.0 (48.2)	12.5 (54.5)	17.9 (64.2)	22.5 (72.5)	25.2 (77.4)	28.8 (83.8)	30.1 (86.2)	26.4 (79.5)	20.9 (69.6)	15.5 (59.9)	10.4 (50.7)	18.9 (66.1)
Daily mean °C (°F)	1.5 (34.7)	2.4 (36.3)	6.0 (42.8)	11.5 (52.7)	16.8 (62.2)	20.4 (68.7)	23.9 (75.0)	24.9 (76.8)	21.3 (70.3)	15.5 (59.9)	9.3 (48.7)	3.8 (38.8)	13.1 (55.6)
Mean daily minimum °C (°F)	−3.5 (25.7)	−3.0 (26.6)	0.1 (32.2)	5.5 (41.9)	11.6 (52.9)	16.3 (61.3)	20.3 (68.5)	21.2 (70.2)	17.4 (63.3)	11.1 (52.0)	4.2 (39.6)	−1.1 (30.0)	8.3 (47.0)
Record low °C (°F)	−10.9 (12.4)	−11.3 (11.7)	−9.3 (15.3)	−4.7 (23.5)	1.0 (33.8)	7.8 (46.0)	11.4 (52.5)	12.2 (54.0)	5.5 (41.9)	0.1 (32.2)	−4.3 (24.3)	−9.1 (15.6)	−11.3 (11.7)
Average precipitation mm (inches)	40.9 (1.61)	37.5 (1.48)	91.8 (3.61)	125.7 (4.95)	153.0 (6.02)	203.6 (8.02)	239.3 (9.42)	240.4 (9.46)	246.1 (9.69)	186.1 (7.33)	75.8 (2.98)	37.2 (1.46)	1,677.2 (66.03)
Average precipitation days (≥ 1.0 mm)	4.0	5.0	8.7	10.6	11.8	14.8	15.7	13.8	13.5	10.1	6.5	4.1	118.6
Mean monthly sunshine hours	206.4	194.5	196.1	187.8	177.5	120.6	128.2	153.4	122.6	139.3	166.7	195.2	1,988.4
Source 1: 理科年表
Source 2: Japan Meteorological Agency (averages: 1981-2010; peaks: 1888-present)

=== Demographics ===
Per Japanese census data, the population of Kanuma peaked around the year 2000 and has declined since.

Historical population
Year	Pop.	±%
1920	68,981	—
1930	74,561	+8.1%
1940	77,462	+3.9%
1950	98,504	+27.2%
1960	91,896	−6.7%
1970	89,196	−2.9%
1980	95,999	+7.6%
1990	101,098	+5.3%
2000	104,764	+3.6%
2010	103,257	−1.4%
2020	94,033	−8.9%

== History ==
Kanuma was the castle town for a 25,000 koku feudal domain in the early Edo period. Even after the domain was suppressed by the Tokugawa shogunate, the area continued to prosper from its location with a number of post stations on the Nikkō Reiheishi Kaidō. The town of Kanuma was created on April 1, 1889, with the establishment of then modern municipalities system. It was raised to city status on October 10, 1948. On January 1, 2006, the town of Awano (from Kamitsuga District) was merged into Kanuma.

== Government ==
Kanuma has a mayor-council form of government with a directly elected mayor and a unicameral city legislature of 24 members. Kanuma contributes three members to the Tochigi Prefectural Assembly. In terms of national politics, the city is part of Tochigi 2nd district of the lower house of the Diet of Japan.

== Economy ==
The economy of Kanuma is primarily agricultural. Hemp was once a major cash crop, but has been supplanted by soba and strawberries.

== Education ==
Kanuma has 24 primary schools and ten middle schools operated by the city government. The city has four public high schools operated by the Tochigi Prefectural Board of Education.

== Transportation ==
=== Railway ===
JR East – Nikkō Line

- Kanuma

Tobu Railway – Tobu Nikkō Line

- Niregi - Momiyama - Shin-Kanuma - Kita-Kanuma - Itaga

=== Highway ===
- Tōhoku Expressway – Kanuma Interchange
- National Route 121
- National Route 293
- National Route 352

== International relations ==
- Tieling, Liaoning, China
- Grand Forks, North Dakota, United States

== Notable people ==
- Sayaka Hirano, table tennis player
- Guts Ishimatsu, boxer
- Tosio Kato, mathematician
- Takuya Kawamura, member of QuizKnock
- Hisashi Kurosaki, football player
- Takeji Nara, Imperial Japanese Army general
- Manabu Wakabayashi, football player
- Michio Yuzawa, politician and cabinet minister
