= Momiyama Station =

Railway station in Kanuma, Tochigi Prefecture, Japan

TN17 Momiyama Station 樅山駅
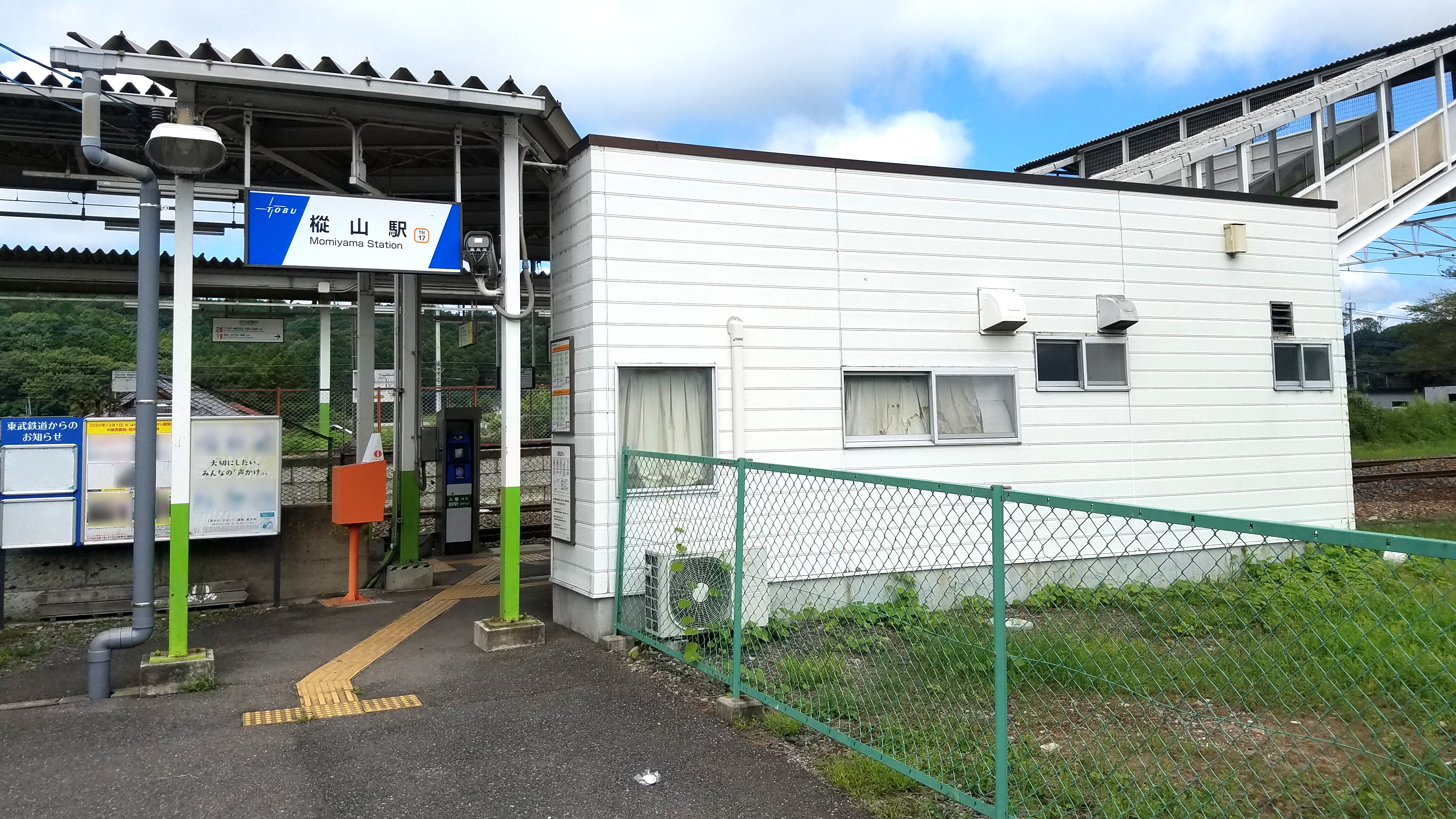
- Momiyama Station in August 2021

General information
- Location: 702-2 Momiyama-machi, Kanuma-shi, Tochigi-ken 322-0046; Japan
- Coordinates: 36.5324°N 139.7421°E
- Operator: Tobu Railway
- Line: Tobu Nikko Line
- Distance: 64.2 km from Tōbu-Dōbutsu-Kōen
- Platforms: 2 side platforms

Other information
- Station code: TN-17
- Website: Official website

History
- Opened: 1 April 1929

Passengers
- FY2020: 546 daily

Services
Preceding station	Tobu Railway	Following station
Niregi TN16 towards Tōbu-Dōbutsu-Kōen	Nikkō Line Local	Shin-Kanuma TN18 towards Tōbu–Nikkō
Location
- Location within Tochigi Prefecture Location within Japan

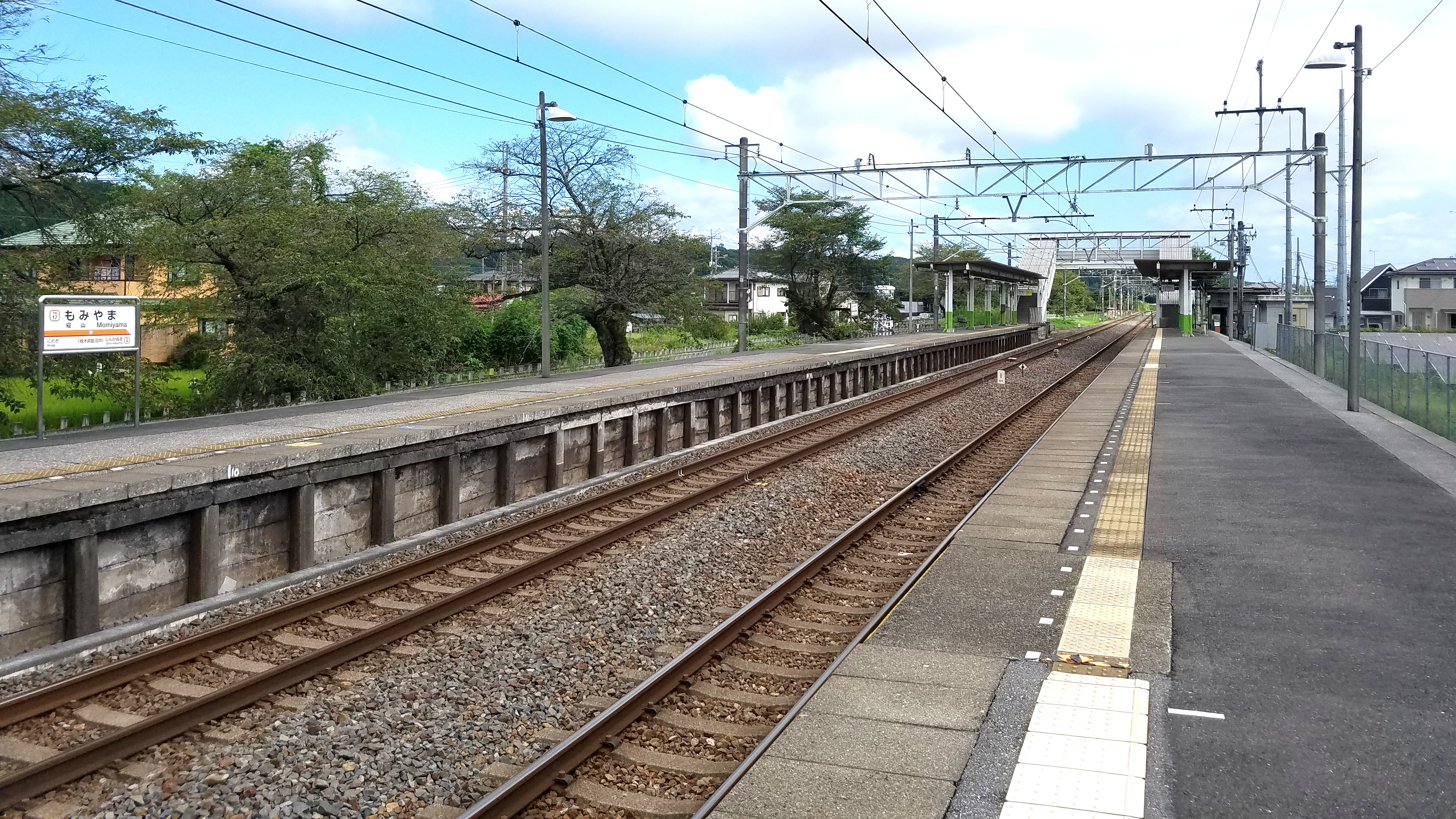
Momiyama Station platforms in August 2021

Momiyama Station (樅山駅, Momiyama-eki) is a railway station in the city of Kanuma, Tochigi, Japan, operated by the private railway operator Tobu Railway. The station is numbered "TN-17".

== Lines ==
Momiyama Station is served by the Tobu Nikko Line, and is 64.2 km from the starting point of the line at Tōbu-Dōbutsu-Kōen.

== Station layout ==
This station consists of two side platforms serving two tracks connected to the station building by a footbridge.

=== Platforms ===
1	■ Tobu Nikko Line	for Shin-Tochigi and Tōbu-Dōbutsu-Kōen
2	■ Tobu Nikko Line	for Tōbu-Nikkō

== History ==
Momiyama Station opened on 1 April 1929. It became unstaffed from 1 September 1973.

From 17 March 2012, station numbering was introduced on all Tobu lines, with Momiyama Station becoming "TN-17".

== Passenger statistics ==
In fiscal 2019, the station was used by an average of 546 passengers daily (boarding passengers only).

== Surrounding area ==
- National Route 293
- National Route 352
- Momiyama Post Office

== See also ==
- List of railway stations in Japan
