= Itaga Station =

Railway station in Kanuma, Tochigi Prefecture, Japan

TN20 Itaga Station 板荷駅
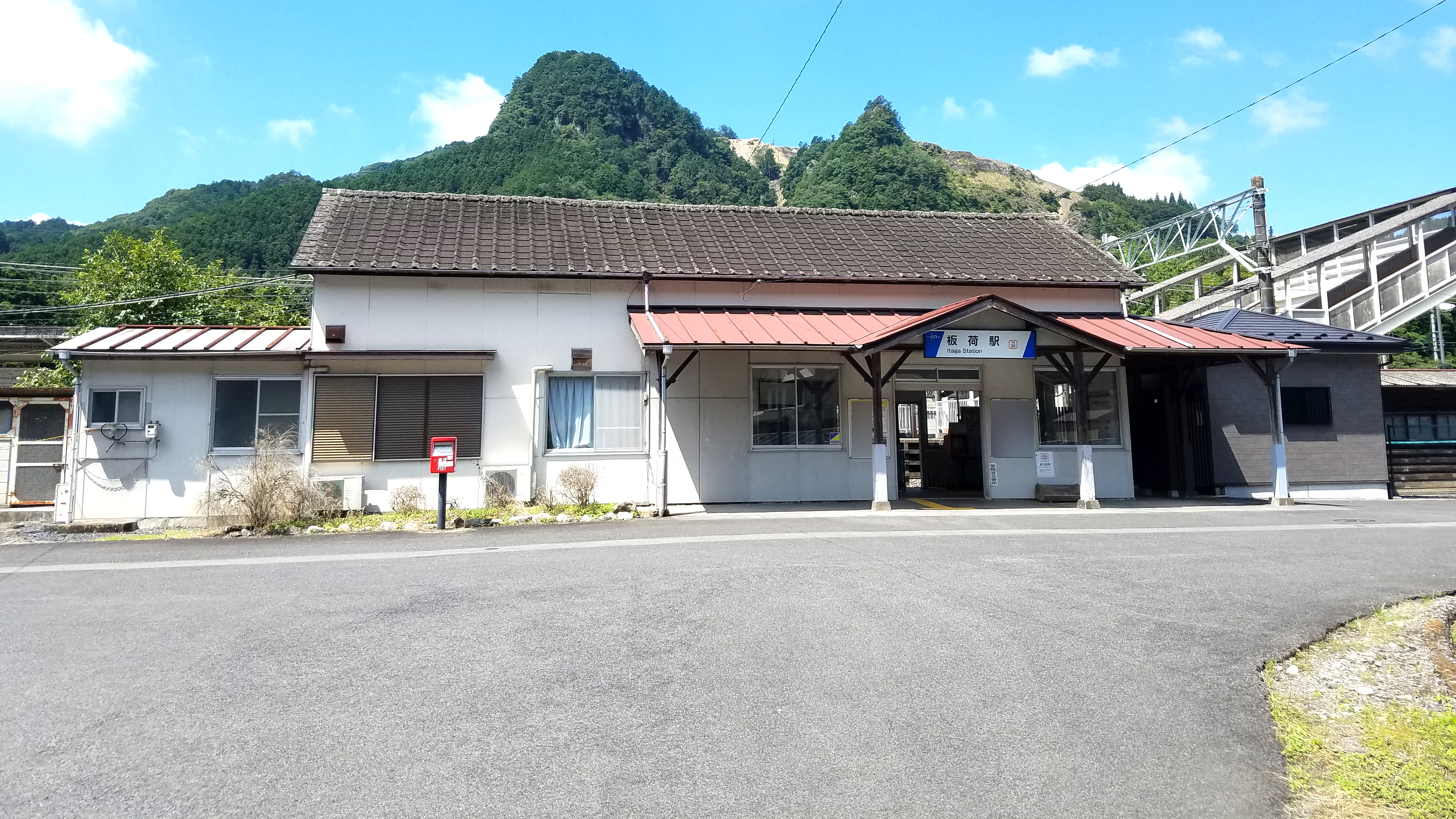
- Itaga Station in August 2021

General information
- Location: 222 Itaga, Kanuma-shi, Tochigi-ken 321-1111; Japan
- Coordinates: 36°37′12″N 139°42′28″E
- Operator: Tobu Railway
- Line: Tobu Nikko Line
- Distance: 74.9 km from Tōbu-Dōbutsu-Kōen
- Platforms: 1 island platform

Other information
- Station code: TN-20
- Website: Official website

History
- Opened: 7 July 1929

Passengers
- FY2020: 87 daily

Services
Preceding station	Tobu Railway	Following station
Kita-Kanuma TN19 towards Tōbu-Dōbutsu-Kōen	Nikkō Line Local	Shimo-Goshiro TN21 towards Tōbu–Nikkō
Location
- Location within Tochigi Prefecture Location within Japan

Itaga Station (板荷駅, Itaga-eki) is a railway station in the city of Kanuma, Tochigi, Japan, operated by the private railway operator Tobu Railway. The station is numbered "TN-20".

== Lines ==
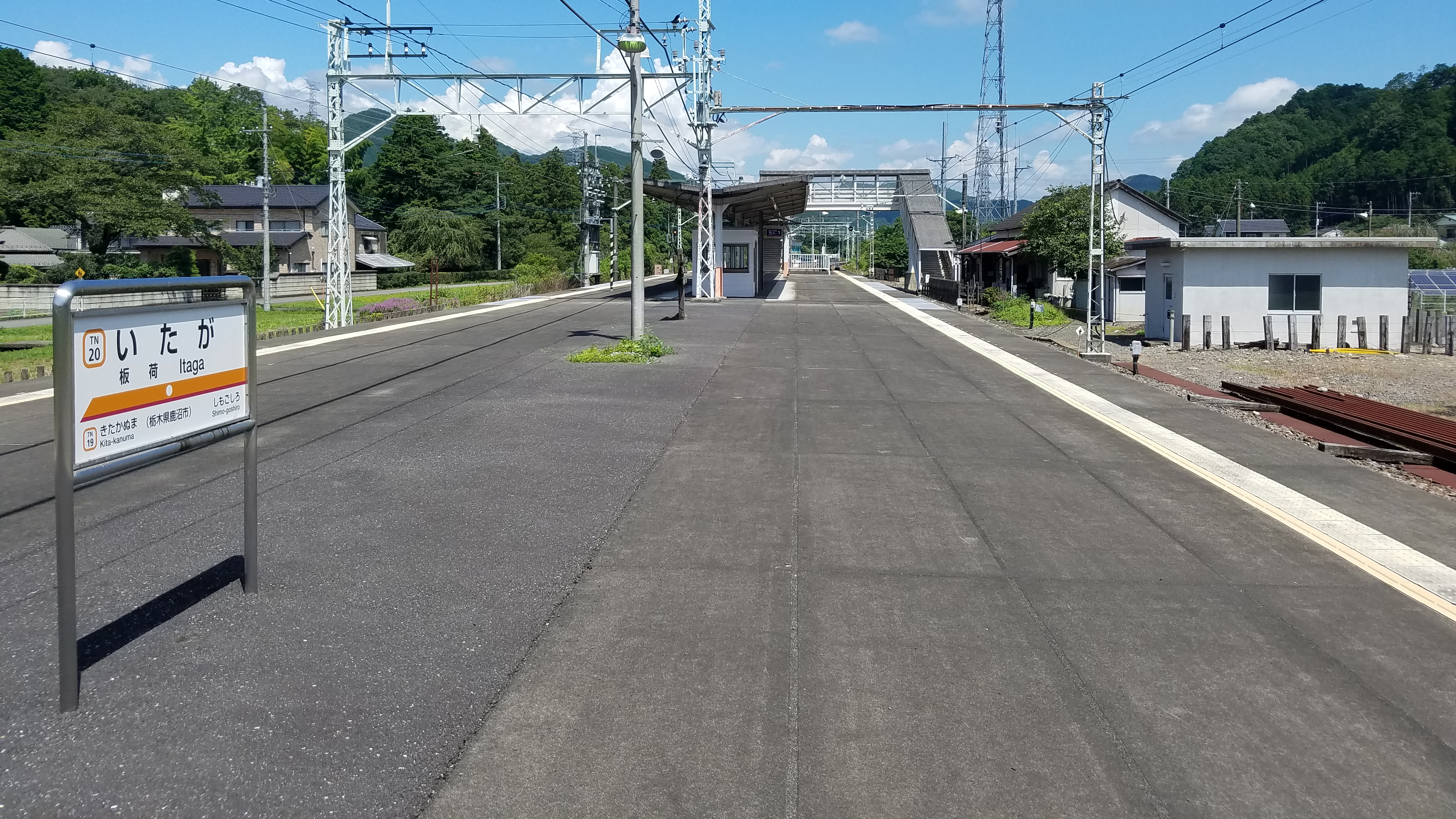
Itaga Station platform in August 2021

Itaga Station is served by the Tobu Nikko Line, and is 74.9 km from the starting point of the line at Tōbu-Dōbutsu-Kōen.

== Station layout ==
The station has one island platform connected to the station building by a footbridge.

=== Platforms ===
1	■ Tobu Nikko Line	for Shin-Tochigi and Tōbu-Dōbutsu-Kōen
2	■ Tobu Nikko Line	for Tōbu-Nikkō

== History ==
Itaga Station opened on 7 July 1929. The platforms were lengthened in 2006.

From 17 March 2012, station numbering was introduced on all Tobu lines, with Itaga Station becoming "TN-20".

== Passenger statistics ==
In fiscal 2019, the station was used by an average of 87 passengers daily (boarding passengers only).

== Surrounding area ==
Itaga Station is located in a rural area south of the center of former Itaga Village

- Kanuma City Itaga Cultural Center

== See also ==
- List of railway stations in Japan
