= Myōjin Station =

Railway station in Nikkō, Tochigi Prefecture, Japan

TN22 Myōjin Station 明神駅
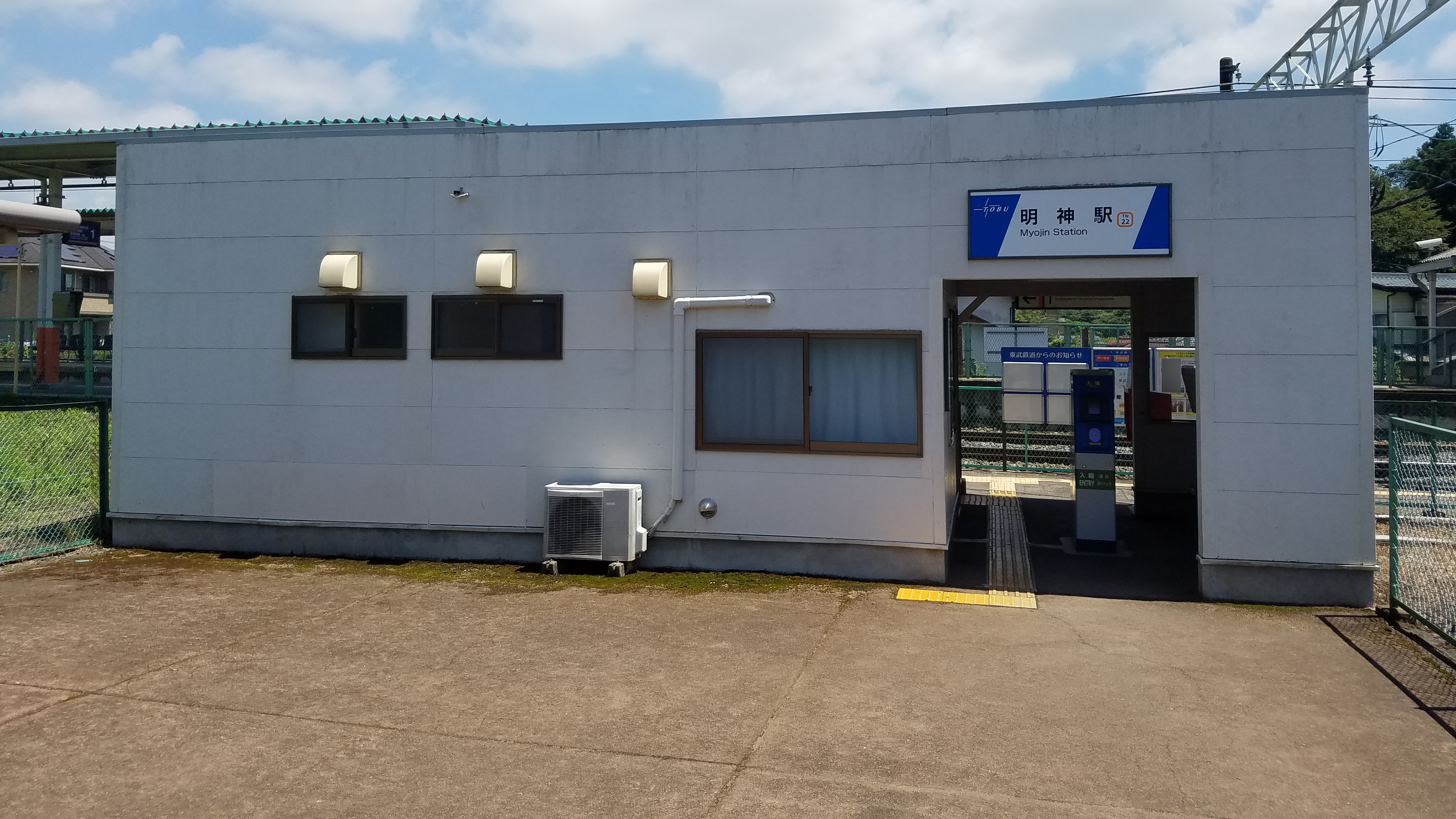
- Myōjin Station entrance in August 2021

General information
- Location: 329 Myōjin, Nikkō-shi, Tochigi-ken 321-1101; Japan
- Coordinates: 36.6765°N 139.7122°E
- Operator: Tobu Railway
- Line: Tobu Nikko Line
- Distance: 81.3 km from Tōbu-Dōbutsu-Kōen
- Platforms: 2 side platforms

Other information
- Station code: TN-22
- Website: Official website

History
- Opened: 1 November 1929

Passengers
- FY2019: 229 daily

Services
| Preceding station | Tobu Railway | Following station |
|---|---|---|
| Shimo-Goshiro TN21 towards Tōbu-Dōbutsu-Kōen | Nikkō Line Local | Shimo-Imaichi TN23 towards Tōbu–Nikkō |
Location
- Location within Tochigi Prefecture Location within Japan

Myōjin Station (明神駅, Myōjin-eki) is a railway station in the city of Nikkō, Tochigi, Japan, operated by the private railway operator Tobu Railway. The station is numbered "TN-22".

== Lines ==
Myōjin Station is served by the Tobu Nikko Line, and is 81.3 km from the starting point of the line at Tōbu-Dōbutsu-Kōen.

== Station layout ==
The station consists of two opposed side platforms, connected to the station entrance by a footbridge.

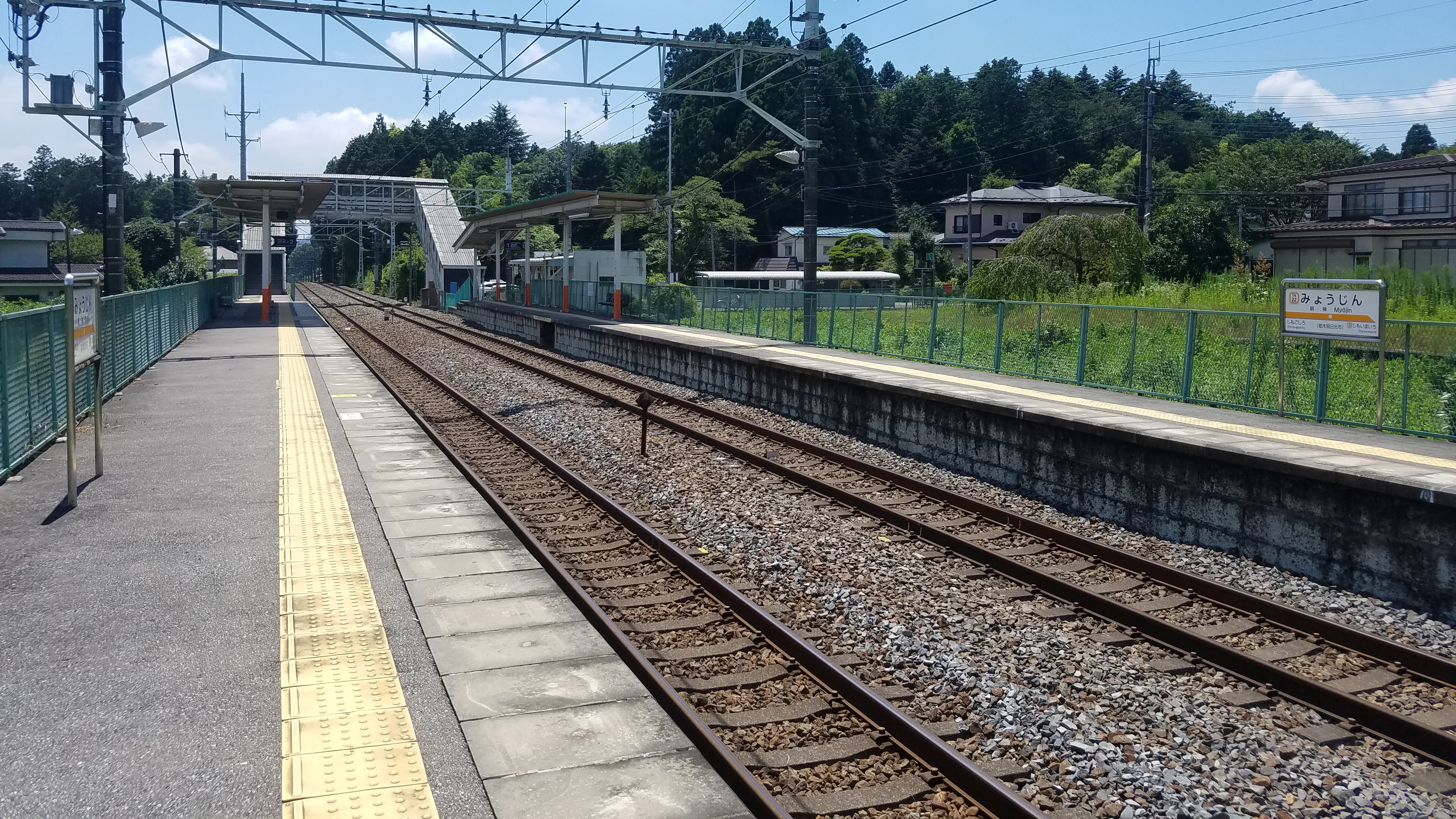
Station platforms in August 2021

=== Platforms ===
| 1 | ■ Tobu Nikko Line | for Tōbu-Nikkō |
| 2 | ■ Tobu Nikko Line | for Shin-Tochigi and Tōbu-Dōbutsu-Kōen |

== History ==
Myōjin Station opened on 1 November 1929. It became unstaffed from 1 September 1973.

From 17 March 2012, station numbering was introduced on all Tobu lines, with Myōjin Station becoming "TN-22".

== Passenger statistics ==
In fiscal 2019, the station was used by an average of 229 passengers daily (boarding passengers only).

== Surrounding area ==
- Imaichi Myōjin Post Office

== See also ==
- List of railway stations in Japan
