= Nishikata, Tochigi =

Dissolved municipality in Tochigi prefecture, Japan

Coordinates: 36°28′N 139°45′E

Location of Nishikata in Tochigi Prefecture

Nishikata (西方町, Nishikata-machi) was a town located in Kamitsuga District, Tochigi Prefecture, Japan.

As of 2003, the town had an estimated population of 6,975 and a density of 217.97 persons per km^{2}. The total area was 32.00 km^{2}.

On October 1, 2011, Nishikata was merged into the expanded city of Tochigi. Kamitsuga District was dissolved as a result of this merger.
