= Kamitsuga District, Tochigi =

Former district in Tochigi prefecture, Japan

Coordinates: 36°22′53″N 139°43′49″E

Kamitsuga (上都賀郡, Kamitsuga-gun) was a district located in Tochigi Prefecture, Japan.

As of 2003, the district had an estimated population of 20,718 and a population density of 52.44 persons per km^{2}. The total area was 395.11 km^{2}.

== Towns and villages ==
- Ashio
- Awano
- Nishikata

== Mergers ==
- On January 1, 2006 - the town of Awano was merged into the expanded city of Kanuma.
- On March 20, 2006 - the town of Ashio, along with the city of Imaichi, the town of Fujihara, and the village of Kuriyama (both from Shioya District), was merged into the expanded city of Nikkō.
- On October 1, 2011 - the town of Nishikata was merged into the expanded city of Tochigi. Kamitsuga District was dissolved as a result of this merger.
