= Niregi Station =

Railway station in Kanuma, Tochigi Prefecture, Japan

TN16 Niregi Station 楡木駅
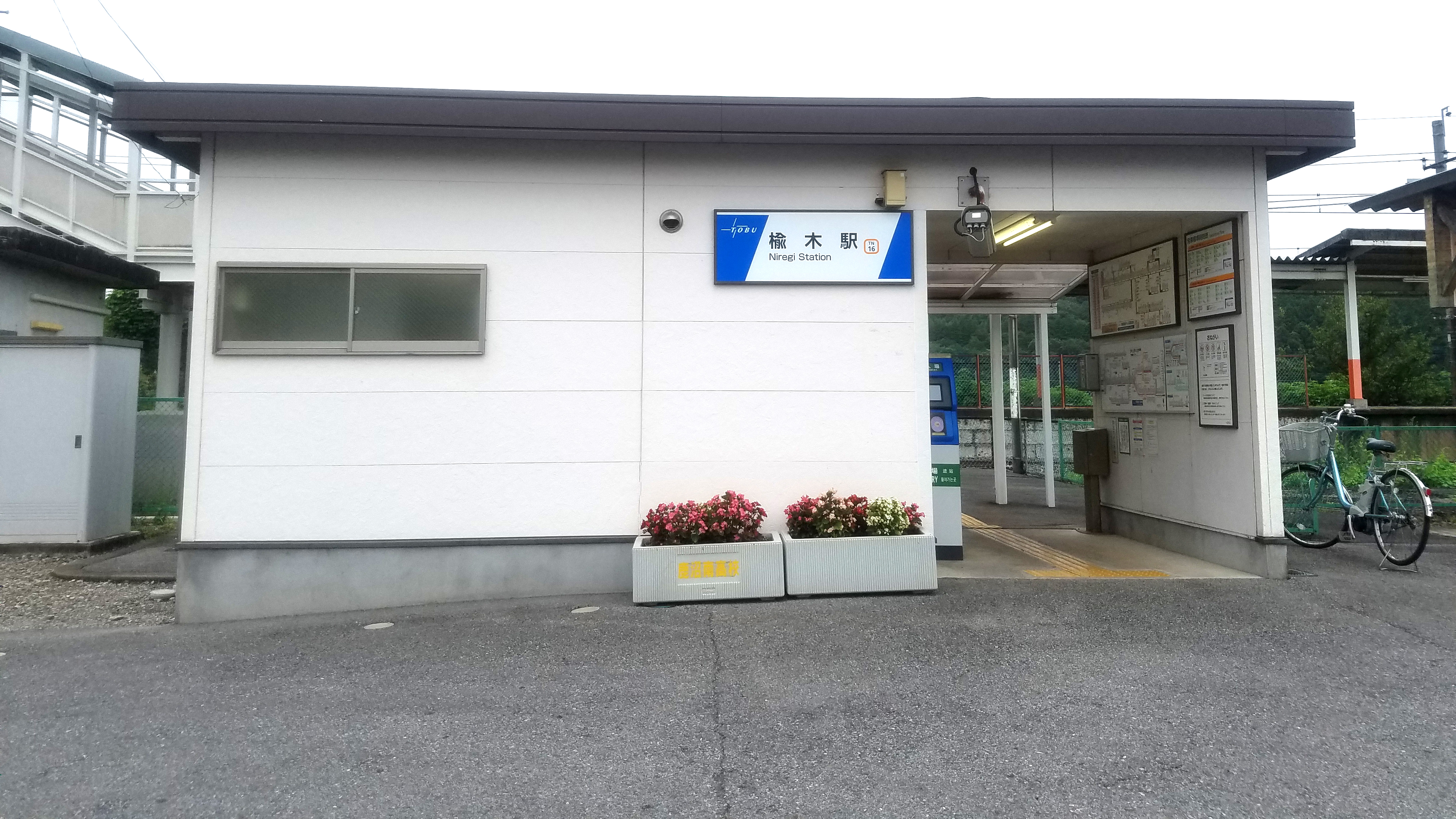
- Niregi Station in August 2021

General information
- Location: 1018 Niregi-machi, Kanuma-shi, Tochigi-ken 322-0526; Japan
- Coordinates: 36.5077°N 139.7451°E
- Operator: Tobu Railway
- Line: Tobu Nikko Line
- Distance: 61.2 km from Tōbu-Dōbutsu-Kōen
- Platforms: 1 island platform

Other information
- Station code: TN-16
- Website: Official website

History
- Opened: 1 April 192

Passengers
- FY2019: 254 daily

Services
| Preceding station | Tobu Railway | Following station |
|---|---|---|
| Tōbu Kanasaki TN15 towards Tōbu-Dōbutsu-Kōen | Nikkō Line Local | Momiyama TN17 towards Tōbu–Nikkō |
Location
- Location within Tochigi Prefecture Location within Japan

Niregi Station (楡木駅, Niregi-eki) is a railway station in the city of Kanuma, Tochigi, Japan, operated by the private railway operator Tobu Railway. The station is numbered "TN-16".

== Lines ==
Niregi Station is served by the Tobu Nikko Line, and is 61.2 km from the starting point of the line at Tōbu-Dōbutsu-Kōen.

== Station layout ==
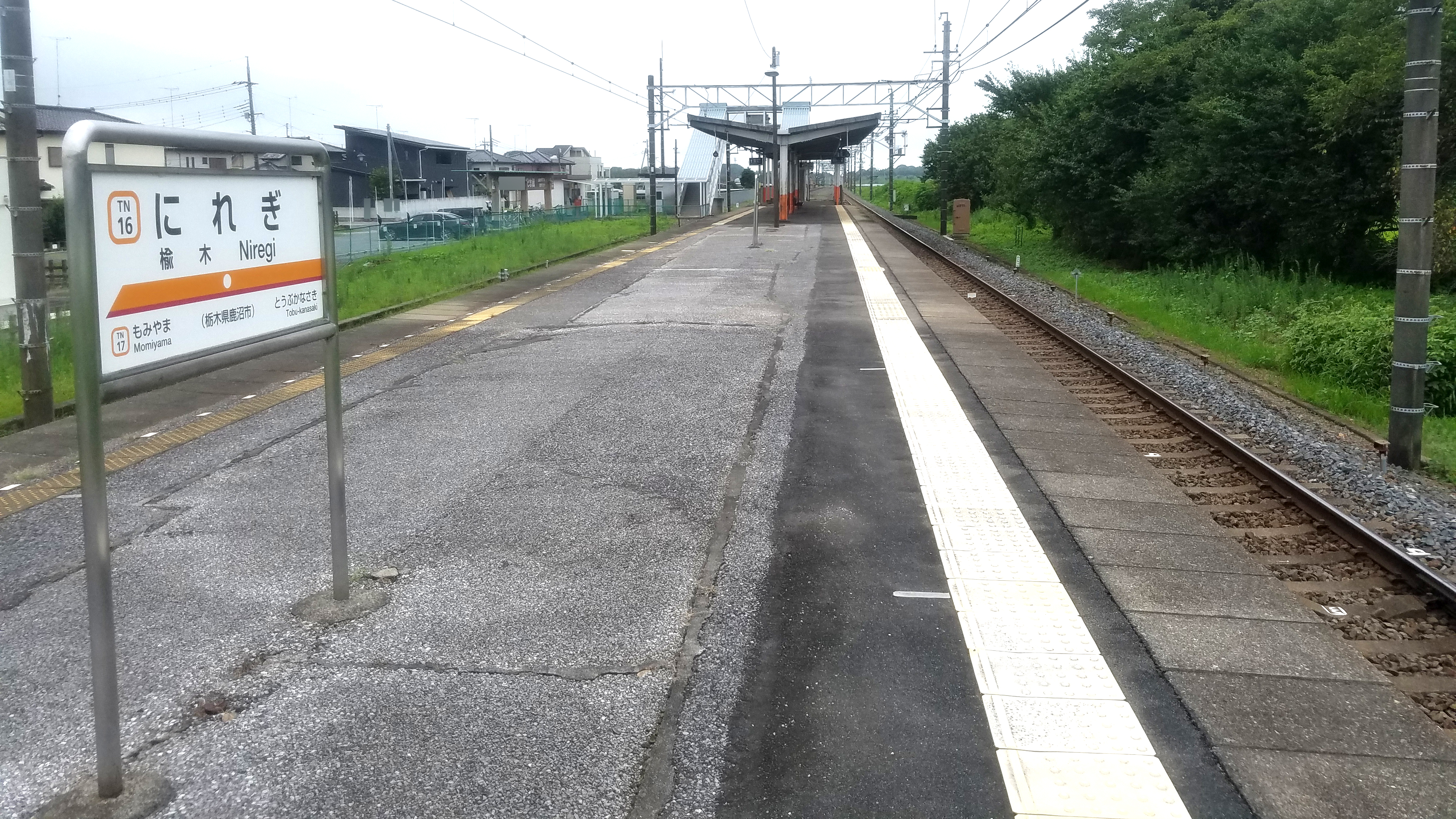
Station platform in August 2021

This station consists of a single island platform serving two tracks, connected to the station building by a footbridge.

=== Platforms ===
| 1 | ■ Tobu Nikko Line | for Shin-Tochigi and Tōbu-Dōbutsu-Kōen |
| 2 | ■ Tobu Nikko Line | for Tōbu-Nikkō |

== History ==
Niregi Station opened on 1 April 1929. It became unstaffed from 1 September 1973.

From 17 March 2012, station numbering was introduced on all Tobu lines, with Niregi Station becoming "TN-16".

== Passenger statistics ==
In fiscal 2019, the station was used by an average of 254 passengers daily (boarding passengers only).

== Surrounding area ==
- National Route 293
- National Route 352
- Niregi Post Office

== See also ==
- List of railway stations in Japan
