= Awano, Tochigi =

Dissolved municipality in Tochigi prefecture, Japan

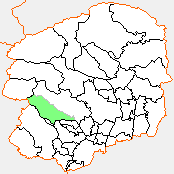
Map of Awano, Tochigi

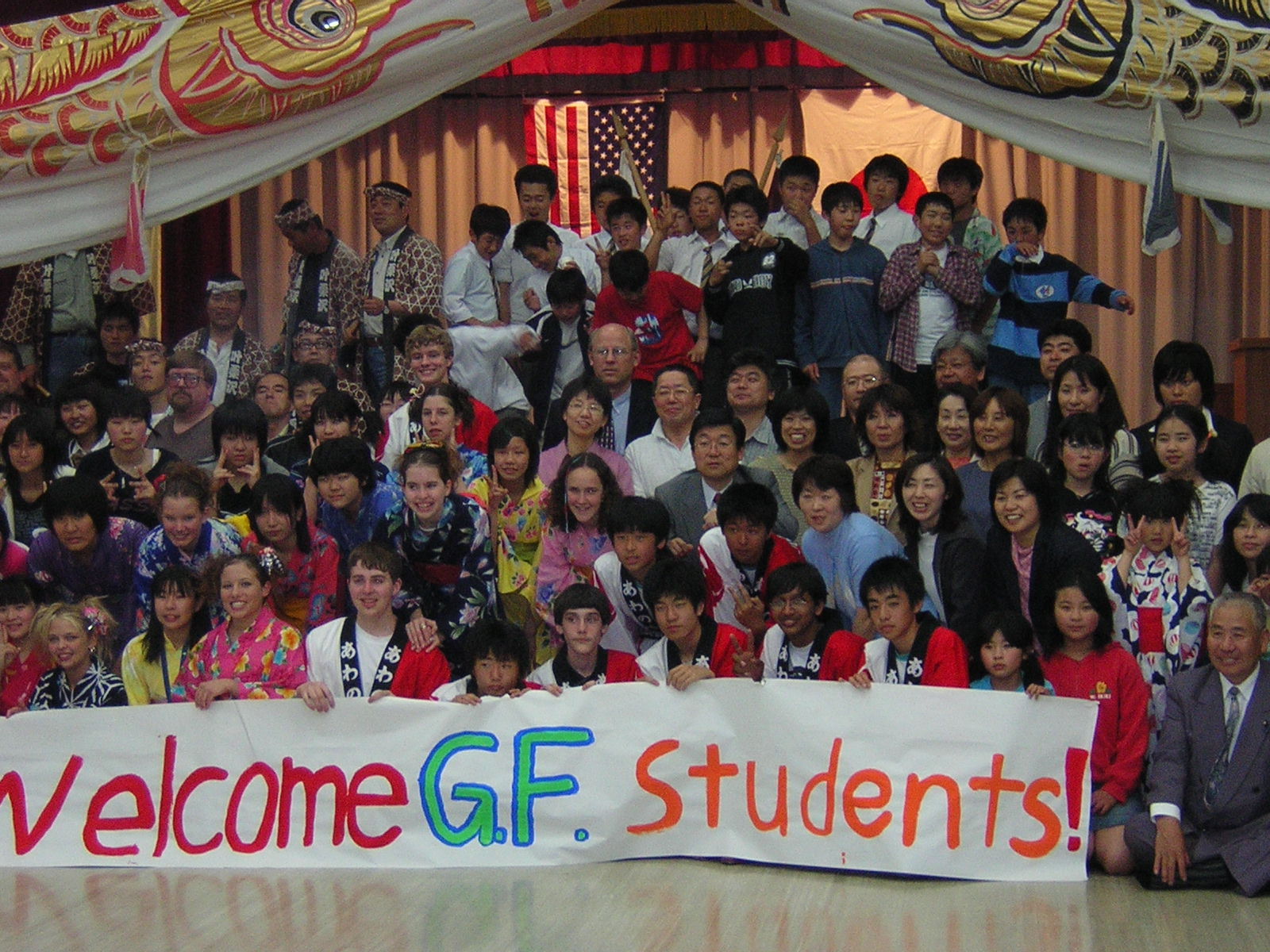
A Welcoming Ceremony held for Students of Grand Forks, North Dakota in Awano, Japan.

Awano (粟野町, Awano-machi) was a town located in Kamitsuga District, Tochigi Prefecture, Japan.

As of 2003, the town has an estimated population of 10,278 and a density of 57.96 persons per km^{2}. The total area is 177.32 km^{2}.

On January 1, 2006, Awano was merged into the expanded city of Kanuma.

The town is part of a Sister City program with Grand Forks, North Dakota in the United States. Each fall, a delegation of Japanese Students visits Grand Forks and stays with a host student. In the spring of the following year, the American students stay with their Japanese host brother or sister in Awano. This program began in 1994, and led to the eventual Sister City program with Grand Forks.
