= QuizKnock =

Japanese YouTube channel and media group

YouTube information
- Channel: QuizKnock
- Years active: 2016–present
- Genres: Entertainment, Quiz, Game show
- Subscribers: 2.63 million
- Views: 4.07 billion
- Type: Kabushiki-kaisha (KK)
- Industry: Entertainment, Education
- Founded: March 20, 2019; 7 years ago in Tokyo, Japan
- Founder: Takushi Izawa
- Headquarters: Ōta, Tokyo, Japan
- Number of employees: 200 (2024)
- Parent: Baton KK
- Website: www.portal.quizknock.com
- Quizknock.com
- Website type: Entertainment, Education
- Available in: 1 languages
- List of languages Japanese
- Founded: 2016
- Editor: Takushi Izawa
- Advertising: yes
- Commercial: yes
- Registration: Optional
- Last updated: March 3, 2026

QuizKnock is a Japanese intellectual media group and YouTube channel focused on question-and-answer-style quizzes. It was founded by Takushi Izawa in October 2016, who also serves as the editor-in-chief of their website. As of March 2026, the channel has amassed over 2.6 million subscribers.

In March 2019, QuizKnock kabushiki-gaisha was founded by Izawa, serving as the company's CEO. It is a part of Baton KK's multi-channel network. The company is currently headquartered at Ōta, Tokyo, Japan.

== History ==
In an interview with NNN, Takushi Izawa, a student of the University of Tokyo, the concept of QuizKnock was made in summer of 2016. An editorial meeting was held in August 2016 in his apartment with his fellow University of Tokyo’s quiz club members about publishing a website.

QuizKnock was founded on October 2, 2016 with the first article published on their website. He said in an interview with The Japan News that the first members are part of the University of Tokyo's Quiz Club. He also said that he founded the group because he "wanted to create a system that would encourage people to proactively seek out information." They started creating quizzes online but failed to reach a wide audience. He recalled it as an "irrational choice" to launch QuizKnock. According to Fukura P, the name QuizKnock comes from "knocking on the door to the world through quizzes".

In December of that year, Fukura P, who works as the group's quiz maker, joined the group and proposed to create a YouTube channel, which was the first ever channel to be specialized in quizzes in Japan. In 2017, Shunki Sugai joined the group. On March 20, 2019, Izawa dropped out of the University of Tokyo Graduate School and founded QuizKnock kabushiki-gaisha (QuizKnock Co., Ltd.). The channel hit 1 million subscribers in 2019.

The group made an appearance in the 2020 anime Ahare! Meisaku-kun. In 2020, they uploaded a video featuring Japanese science YouTuber "Geki Labo", which includes Yamamoto Yoshiaki gargling liquid nitrogen as part of the quiz. RealSound praised the video for its "high quality" production but commented that the stunt was dangerous. The group held a QuizKnock 5th Anniversary Exhibition in October 2021 in Shibuya. Mon and Gon Higashi joined the group in 2022 and serve as the group's quiz masters. The channel hit 2 million subscribers on March 10, 2023. The group was ranked 6th on the "Favorite YouTuber Ranking" conducted by Oricon for 2023. As of 2024, QuizKnock Co., Ltd. has about 200 employees comprising project planners, question writers, editors and proofreaders.

They collaborated with the Imperial Household Agency to create puzzles set in the Imperial Palace East Garden which can be solved through their smartphones. The event is set to run from March 18, 2025 to March 31, 2027. The project is part of an effort to help deepen understanding of the Imperial Family and to appeal to younger generations. The group supervised by the quiz part of the 2026 film Your Own Quiz.

== Members ==
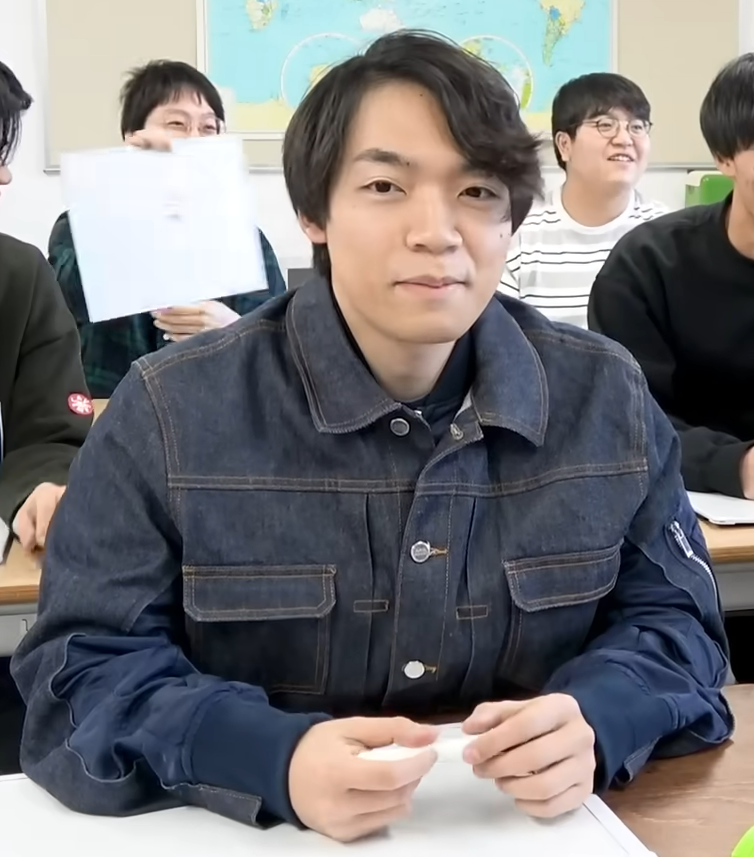
Takushi Izawa

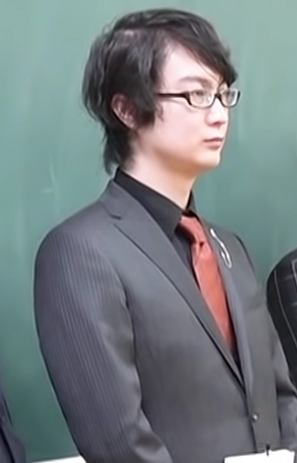
Takuya Kawamura

Fukura P

Shunki Sugai

Yoshiaki Yamamoto

Mon Higashi

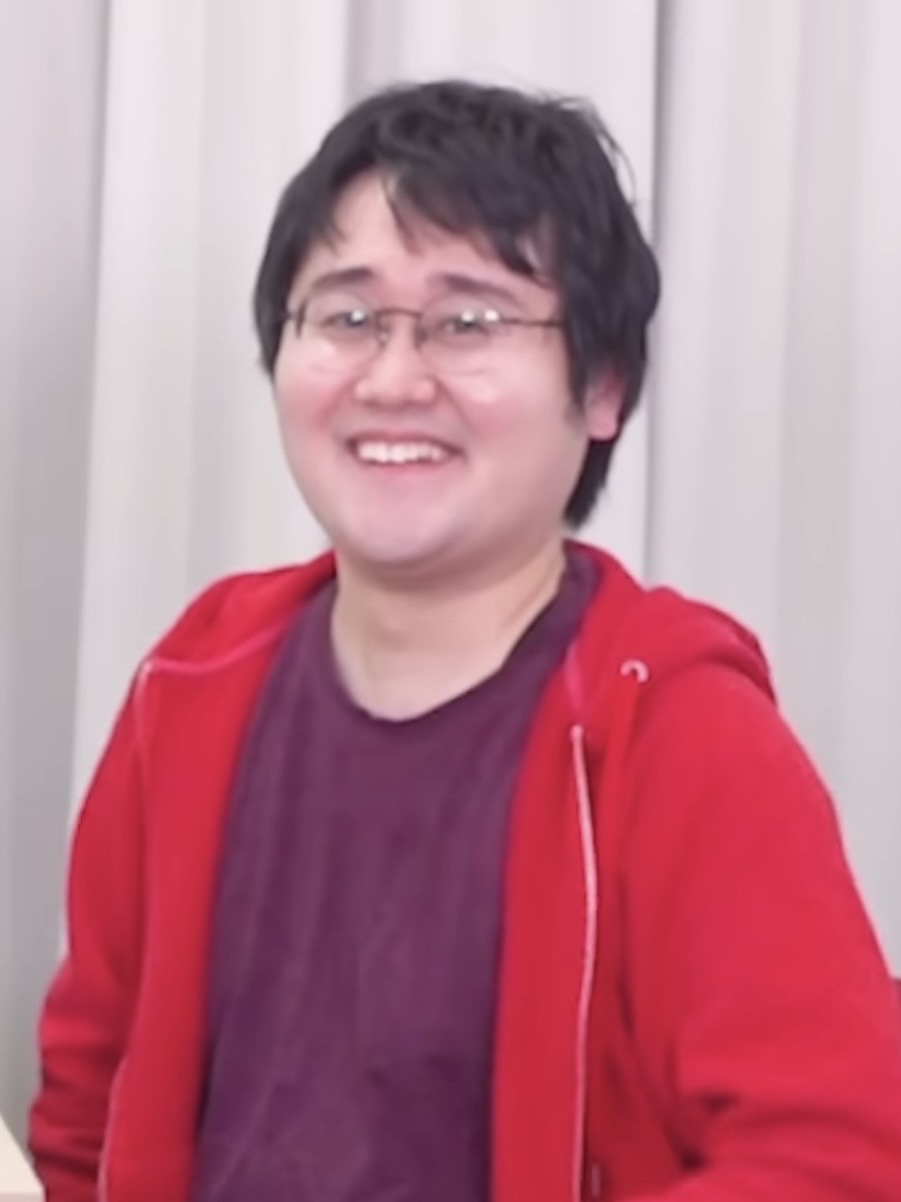
Hisanori Tsurusaki
- Takushi Izawa
- Yoshiaki Yamamoto
- Fukura P
- Mon and Gon Higashi
- Takuya Kawamura
- Hisanori Tsurusaki
- Shunki Sugai

== Reception ==
The Japan News describes the group as "bounded by 'respect on knowledge'". RealSound praised QuizKnock for combining entertainment and knowledge. In a survey conducted by Oricon, parents praised the channels for portraying quizzes as "fun" and "enjoyable".

=== Awards and nominations ===
Year	Ceremony	Category	Result	Ref.
2025	An An Awards	Creative category	Won	

== Legacy ==
The 2022 novel Your Own Quiz was inspired by the videos of the group.
