= Fujihara, Tochigi =

Dissolved municipality in Tochigi prefecture, Japan

Coordinates: 36°51′N 139°44′E

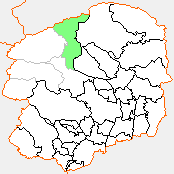
Map of Fujihara, Tochigi

Fujihara (藤原町, Fujihara-machi) was a town located in Shioya District, Tochigi Prefecture, Japan.

As of 2001, the town had an estimated population of 13,798 and a density of 23.85 persons per km^{2}. The total area was 2,072.27 km^{2}.

On March 20, 2006, Fujihara, along with the city of Imaichi, the town of Ashio (from Kamitsuga District), and the village of Kuriyama (also from Shioya District), was merged into the expanded city of Nikkō.
