= Izawa Takushi =

Japanese quiz contest player (born 1994)

- 伊沢拓司
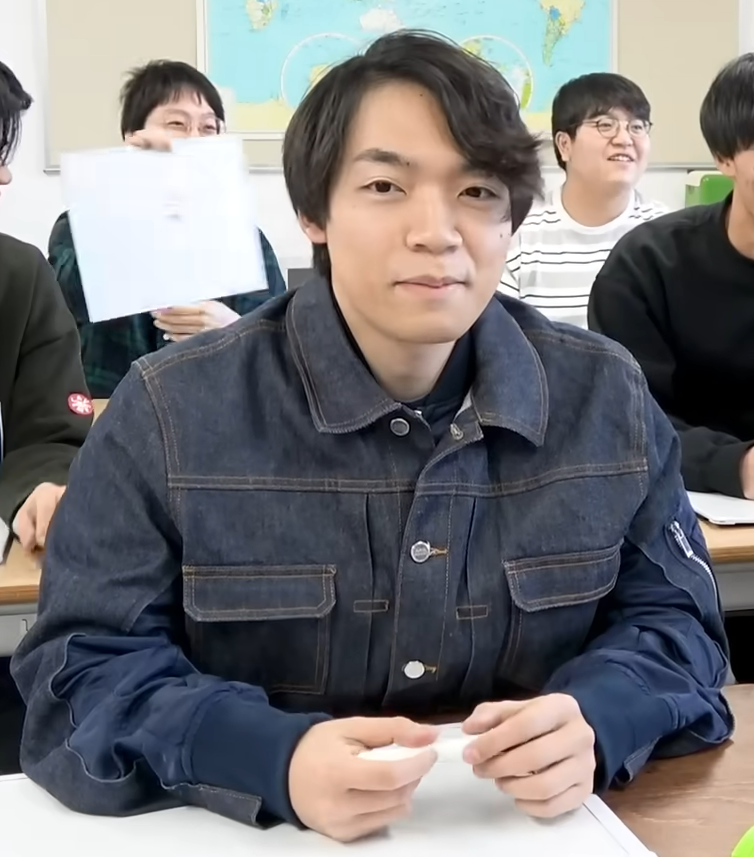
- Izawa in 2023
- Born: May 16, 1994 (age 32); Ōmiya City, Saitama Prefecture, Japan
- Other names: Quiz King of Tokyo University, Quiz King
- Education: University of Tokyo (MS)
- Occupations: Quiz contest player; YouTuber; entrepreneur; television personality
- Years active: 2016 – present
- Known for: Founding QuizKnock

Izawa Takushi (Japanese: 伊沢拓司; born May 16, 1994) is a Japanese quiz contest player, YouTuber, entrepreneur and television personality. He is the founder, as well as CEO and editor-in-chief of the YouTube and intellectual media group QuizKnock. He was nicknamed as "Quiz King of Tokyo University" (東大出身のクイズ王) or simply Quiz King.

== Early life and education ==
Izawa was born on May 16, 1994, in Ōmiya City (now part of Ōmiya-ku, Saitama City), Saitama Prefecture. He later moved to Ibaraki Prefecture and was an only child in a dual-income household. His father is Takashi Izawa, a former office worker at Yomeishu Seizo Manufacturing Company. His father introduced him to reading.

He attended Gyosei Elementary School. He said during this time he was interested in football and wanted to be a professional football player but he said that he lacks the skills to do it. He researched various topics including World Cup participants. He said this was the first time he discovered the "fun in gathering knowledge". He attended the Kaisei Middle School after his friends said that they were taking the entrance exam for that middle school. This was where he first joined a quiz club, which had eight members. He graduated from Kaisei High School in Tokyo, at which he became the first person to win the solo division of the All Japan High School Quiz Championship two consecutive times, doing so in 2010 and 2011. He enrolled in the University of Tokyo's Faculty of Economics, where he became part of the university's Quiz Club. He tried to enroll for a Master's degree in economics but was rejected, and instead went to the Faculty of Agriculture.

== QuizKnock ==
After losing his part time job in summer of 2016, he said that he wanted to study and thinking of what to do, his seniors in Tokyo University’s quiz club said that doing quizzing as a job was ”not paying well”. He decided to found the QuizKnock, then a news and media website.

On October 2, 2016, after being persuaded by Fukura P, he founded the YouTube group QuizKnock with his fellow club members at the University of Tokyo, becoming its editor-in-chief. The group started by creating online quizzes. He said in an interview with The Japan News he founded the group because he "wanted to create a system that would encourage people to proactively seek out information." Izawa dropped out of university in March 2019; he then founded QuizKnock Co., Ltd. and graduated in the TBS show Toudai King.

== Personal life ==
Izawa was in a three-month relationship when he was 20.

In an interview with the medical blog “Medical Doc”, Izawa said that he used to suffer from severe myopia, and from the second grade of elementary school, he wore glasses, and from college, he said that could not let go of contact lenses. He later received an ICL surgery.

== Filmography ==
=== Television ===
Year	Show	Role	Ref
2013 – 2019	Toudai King	Regular Cast	
2019 – 2024	I am Adventure Boy	Regular Cast	
2020 – Present	Hayashi Osamu no Ima, Shiritai Desho!	Regular Cast	
2025 – Present	Izawa Minami Kawa no Kuizu ni Denai Sekai	Host	

=== Films ===
- Your Own Quiz (2026) - Cameo, Quiz Supervisor.

=== Games ===
- Inazuma Eleven: Victory Road (2025) - Maine Alsop (voice)
