= Fukura P =

Japanese producer (born 1993)

- ふくらP
- Fukura P in 2026
- Born: Ken Fukura (福良 拳󠄁); August 7, 1993 (age 33); Anan, Tokushima Prefecture, Japan
- Other name: Ken Takayama (髙山 拳󠄁) (married name)
- Education: Tokyo Institute of Technology
- Occupations: YouTuber, producer, quiz player
- Years active: 2016 – present
- Employer: QuizKnock KK
- Agent: Watanabe Entertainment
- Spouse: Kazumi Takayama (m. 2024; div. 2025)

YouTube information
- Channel: Fukura P no Ugoku Ten-P
- Genre: Vlogging
- Subscribers: 119 thousand
- Views: 13.32 million
- Last updated: April 30, 2025

Ken Fukura (Japanese: 福良 拳󠄁, Hepburn: Fukura Ken; born August 7, 1993), professionally as Fukura P (ふくらP), is a Japanese YouTuber, producer, and a member of the YouTube and media group QuizKnock.

== Early life ==
Fukura P, born as Ken Fukura, was born on August 7, 1993, in Anan, Tokushima Prefecture. He grew up in Takamatsu, Kagawa Prefecture. He later moved back to Tokushima Prefecture at the age of six, and has loved riddles since he was in first grade. He later moved back to Takamatsu, Kagawa. He said that he hated school when he was elementary.

During his third year in high school, Fukura participated in the National High School Quiz Championship as a representative for Kagawa Prefecture. He lost to the Kaisei High School team, which included Takushi Izawa the later founder of QuizKnock, who was the champion for the first years, as one of its members. Fukura later moved to Tokyo and attended the Tokyo Institute of Technology.

== Quizzing career ==
Fukura became friends with Izawa through quiz competitions in Tokyo. In 2016, he was asked to join QuizKnock, then an online platform that distributed quizzes, which Izawa had formed in October of that year. After joining, Fukira suggested trying to distribute quizzes through YouTube. He became the producer of the channel and was in charge of creating quizzes and editing videos. He later dropped out of University.

In 2022, Fukira won ¥10 million (2022) (US$76,046.7) in Nippon Television's Quiz! Are You Smarter than a 5th Grader?. He donated his winnings to quiz clubs across Japan. In September 2024, he created his own vlogging channel "Fukura P no Ugoku ten-P" (ふくらPの動く点P) to which he uploaded vlogs and videos with his wife.

== Personal life ==
Fukura is the youngest child in his family. His parents started working after graduating high school, and married after meeting at the company where they both worked. He has an older brother who is two years older than him.

Fukura married Kazumi Takayama, a former member of the idol group Nogizaka46, in July 2024 and changed his name to Ken Takayama (高山 拳, Takayama Ken). Takayama was a big fan of Fukura, and asked a mutual acquaintance to ask Fukura to go out with her at a puzzle-solving event. Later, after finding out their mutual love for solving puzzles, the two became friends. Fukura later asked Takayama out and they started dating. Originally, Fukura did not intend to have a wedding ceremony, but later changed his mind and the two had a ceremony in December 2024, held at the North Observatory of the Tokyo Metropolitan Government Building. However, the couple announced their divorce on December 27, 2025.
