= Gotanno Station =

Railway station in Tokyo, Japan

Coordinates: 35.7657°N 139.8098°E

TS11 Gotanno Station 五反野駅
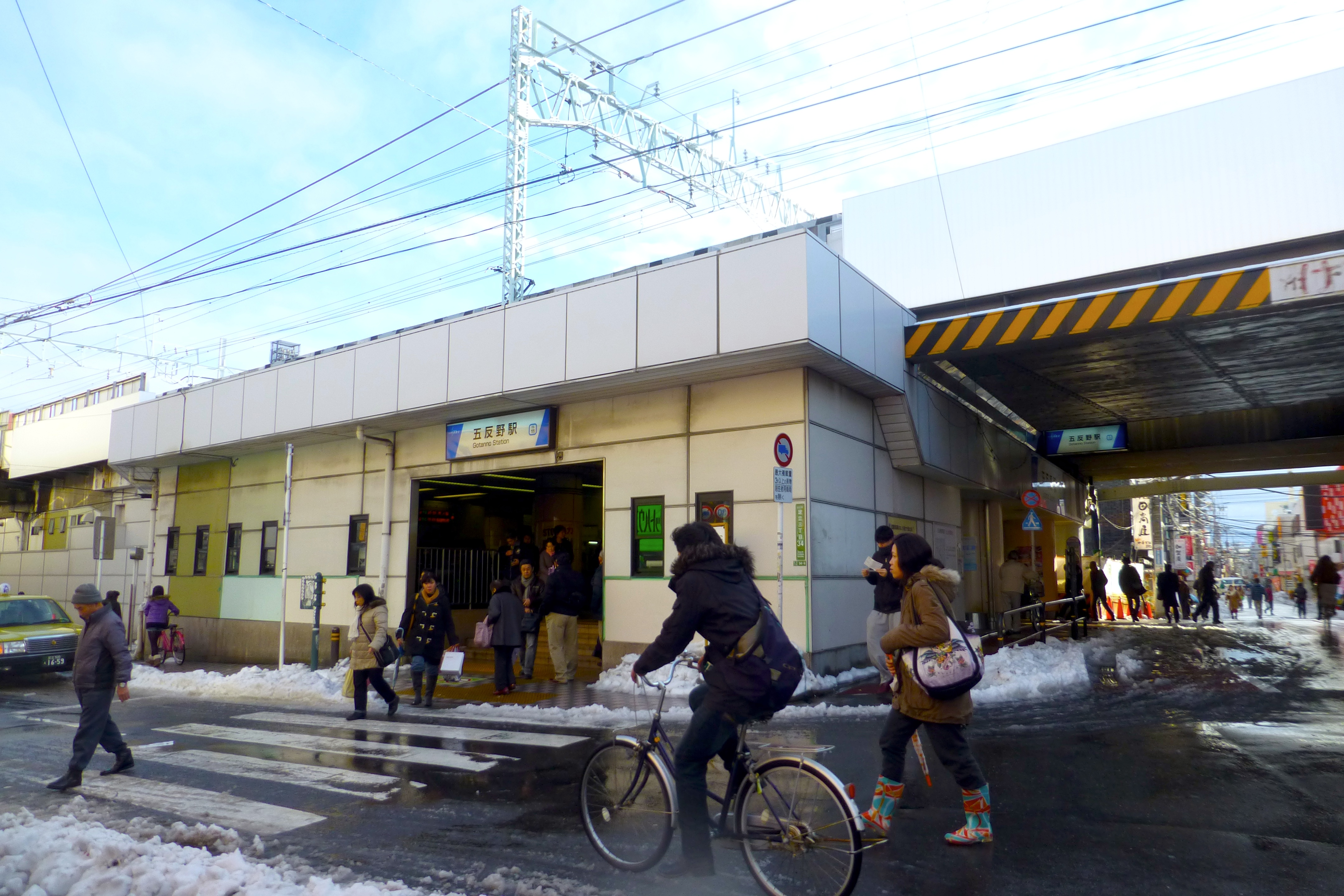
- Station entrances in February 2014

General information
- Location: Adachi, Tokyo; Japan
- Operator: Tobu Railway
- Line: Tobu Skytree Line

Other information
- Station code: TS-11

History
- Opened: 1924

Passengers
- FY2024: 18,412 daily boardings

Services
Preceding station	Tobu Railway	Following station
Kosuge TS10 towards Asakusa	Tobu Skytree Line Local	Umejima TS12 towards Tōbu-Dōbutsu-Kōen
Location

Gotanno Station (五反野駅, Gotanno-eki) is a railway station on the Tobu Skytree Line in Adachi, Tokyo, Japan, operated by the private railway operator Tobu Railway.

== Lines ==
Gotanno Station is served by the Tobu Skytree Line and lies 9.3 km from the line's Tokyo terminus at Asakusa.

== Station layout ==
The station has one island platform serving two tracks, with additional tracks on either side for non-stop trains.

=== Platforms ===
1	Tōbu Skytree Line	for Kita-Senju, Hikifune, and Asakusa; Tokyo Metro Hibiya Line for Ueno and Naka-meguro
2	Tōbu Skytree Line	for Kita-Koshigaya, Kasukabe, and Tōbu-Dōbutsu-Kōen; Tobu Nikko Line for Minami-Kurihashi

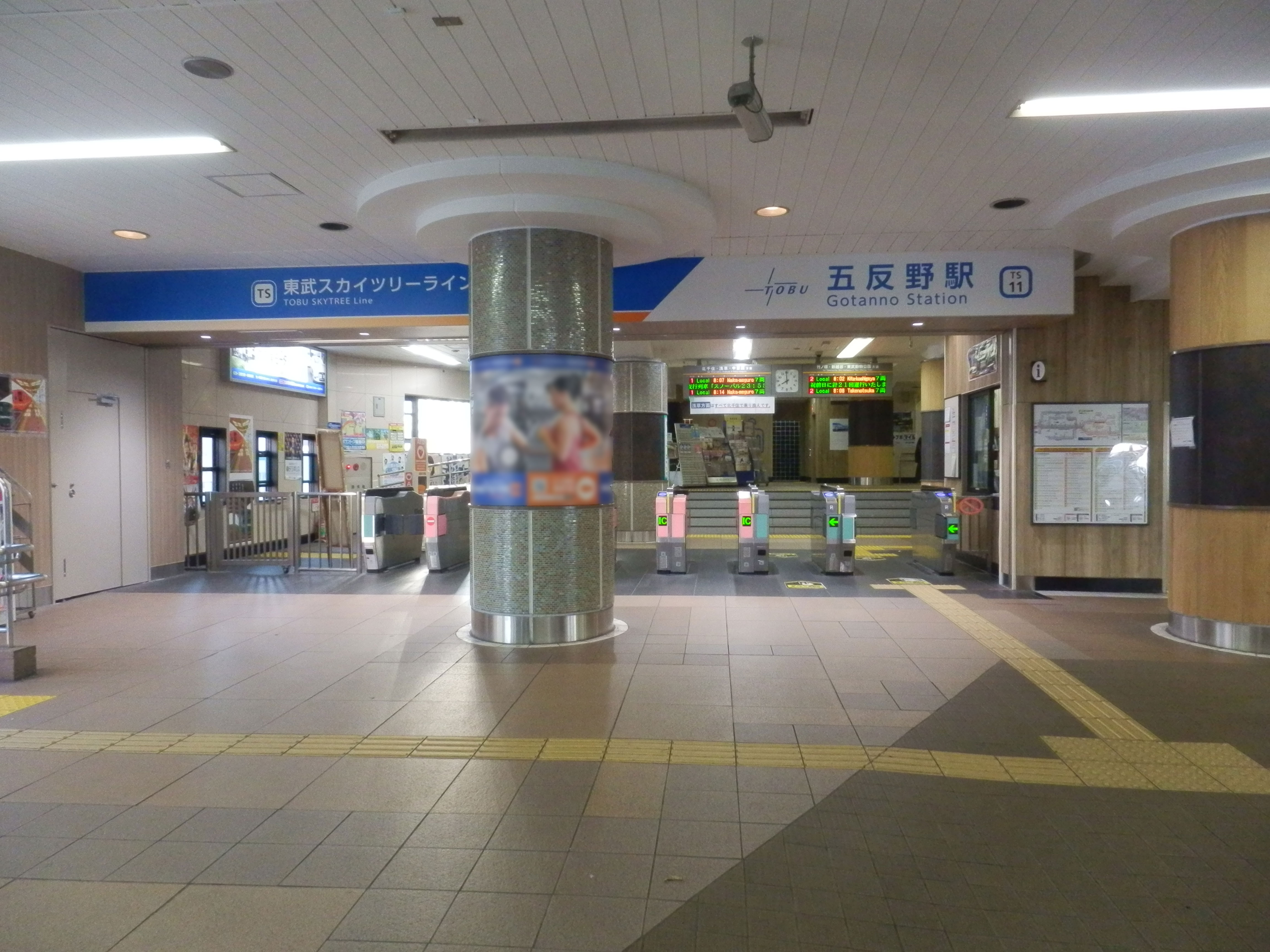
The ticket gates, December 2021

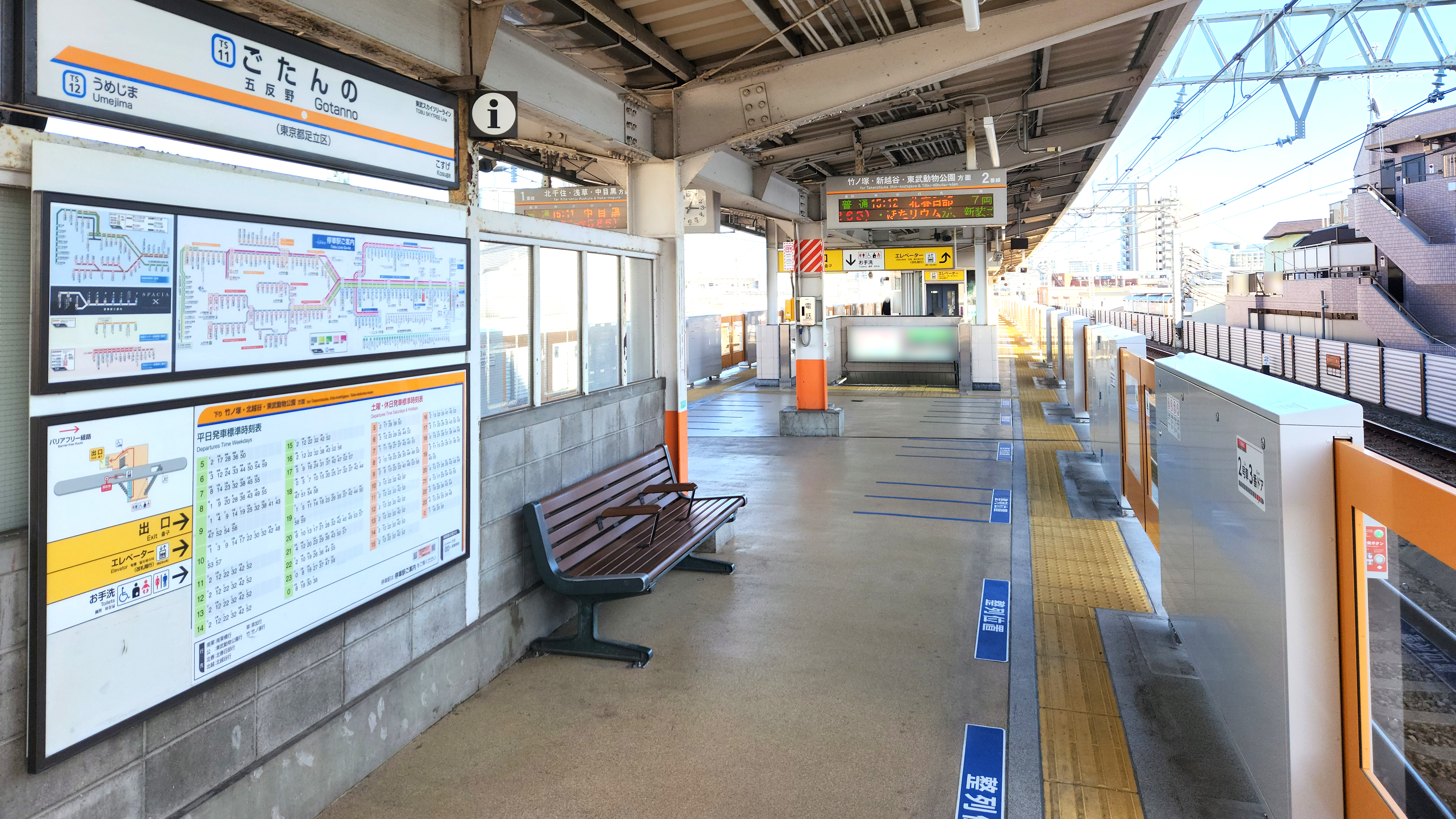
The station platforms, March 2024

== History ==
Gotanno Station opened on 1 October 1924.

From 17 March 2012, station numbering was introduced on all Tobu lines, with Gotanno Station becoming "TS-11".

== Passenger statistics ==
In fiscal 2024, the station was used by an average of 18,412 passengers daily (boarding passengers only).
