= Kosuge Station =

Railway station in Tokyo, Japan

Coordinates: 35.7589°N 139.8128°E

TS10 Kosuge Station 小菅駅
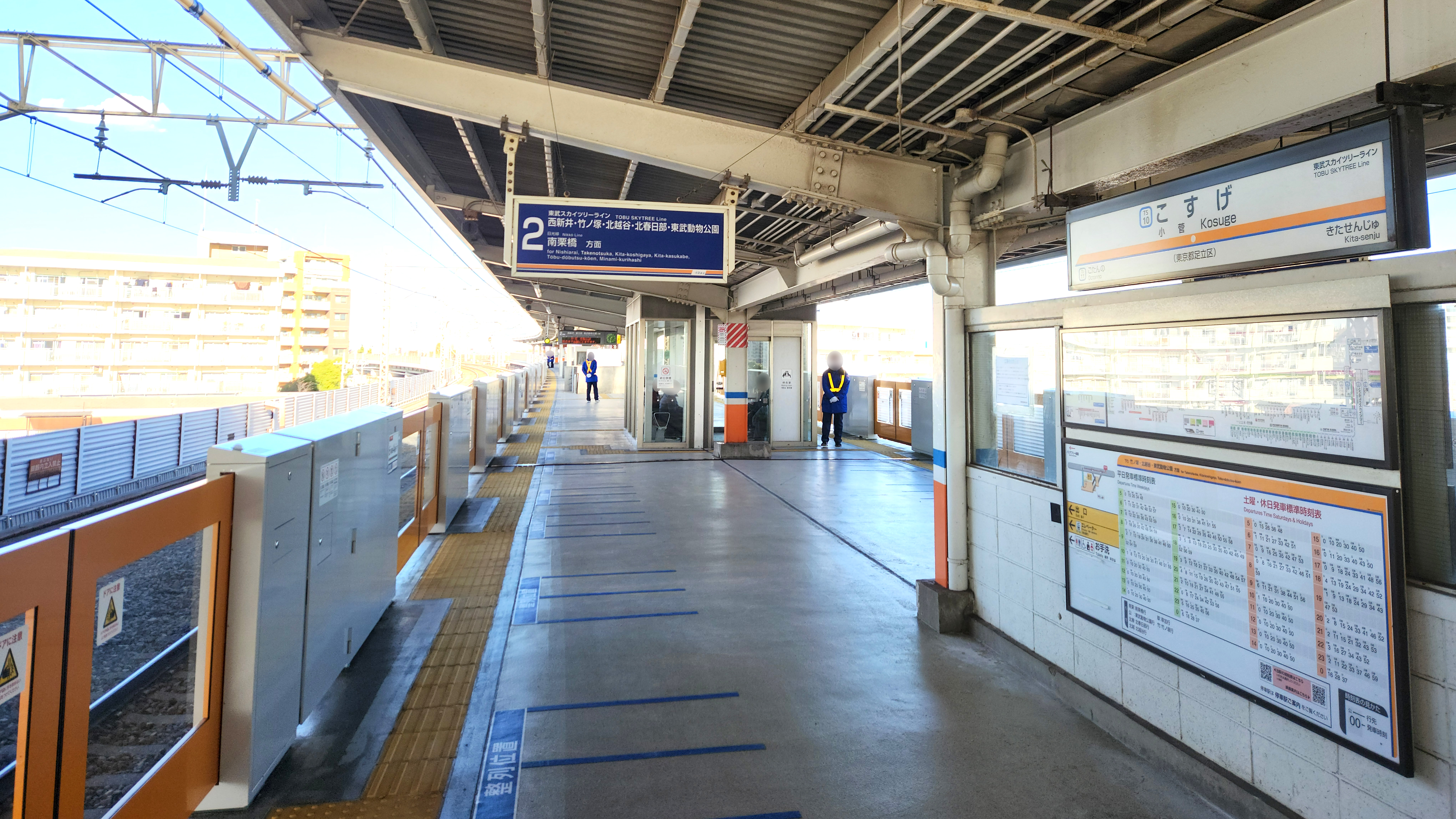
- Station premises in December 2024

General information
- Location: Adachi, Tokyo; Japan
- Operator: Tobu Railway
- Line: Tobu Skytree Line
- Platforms: 1 island platform
- Tracks: 4

Construction
- Structure type: Elevated

Other information
- Station code: TS-10

History
- Opened: 1924

Passengers
- FY2024: 3,182 daily boardings

Services
Preceding station	Tobu Railway	Following station
Kita-Senju TS09 towards Asakusa	Tobu Skytree Line Local	Gotanno TS11 towards Tōbu-Dōbutsu-Kōen
Location

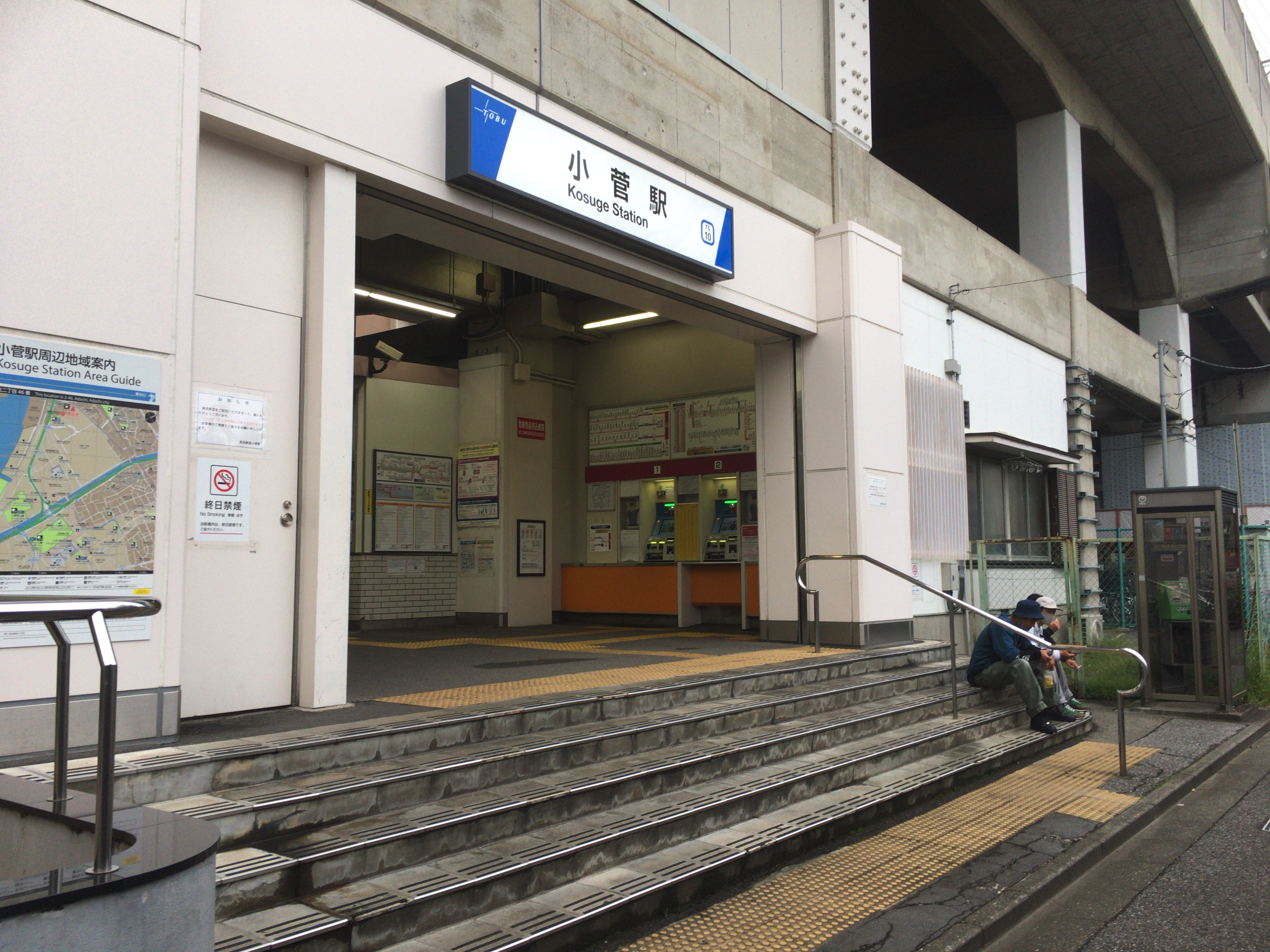
Kosuge Station entrance, October 2020

Kosuge Station (小菅駅, Kosuge-eki) is a railway station on the Tobu Skytree Line in Adachi, Tokyo, Japan, operated by the private railway operator Tobu Railway.

== Lines ==
Kosuge Station is served by the Tobu Skytree Line, and lies 8.2 km from the Tokyo terminus of the line at Asakusa.

== Station layout ==
The station has one island platform serving two tracks, with additional tracks on either side for non-stop trains.

=== Platforms ===
1	Tōbu Skytree Line	for Kita-Senju, Hikifune, and Asakusa; Tokyo Metro Hibiya Line for Ueno and Naka-meguro
2	Tōbu Skytree Line	for Kita-Koshigaya, Kasukabe, and Tōbu-Dōbutsu-Kōen; Tobu Nikko Line for Minami-Kurihashi

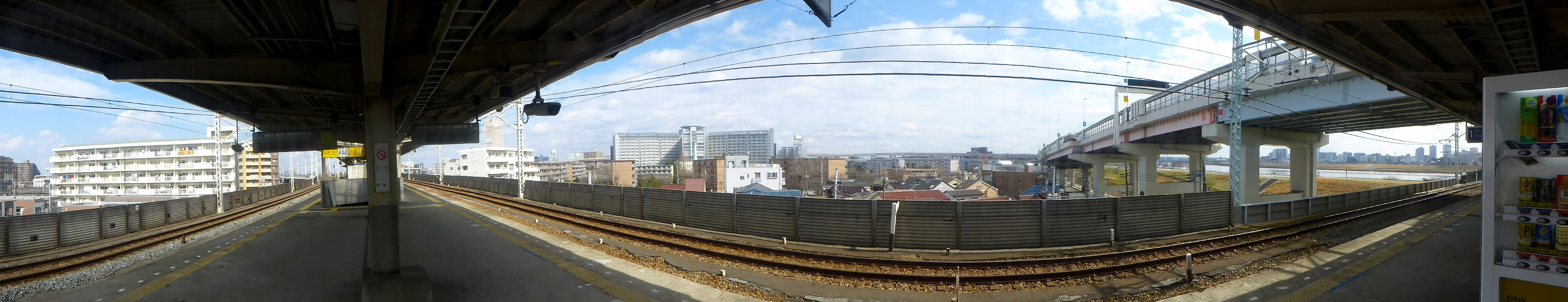
Panorama shot of the platform, March 2014

== History ==
Kosuge Station opened on 1 October 1924.

== Passenger statistics ==
In fiscal 2024, the station was used by an average of 3,182 passengers daily (boarding passengers only).
