= Umejima Station =

Railway station in Tokyo, Japan

Coordinates: 35.7723°N 139.7981°E

TS12 Umejima Station 梅島駅
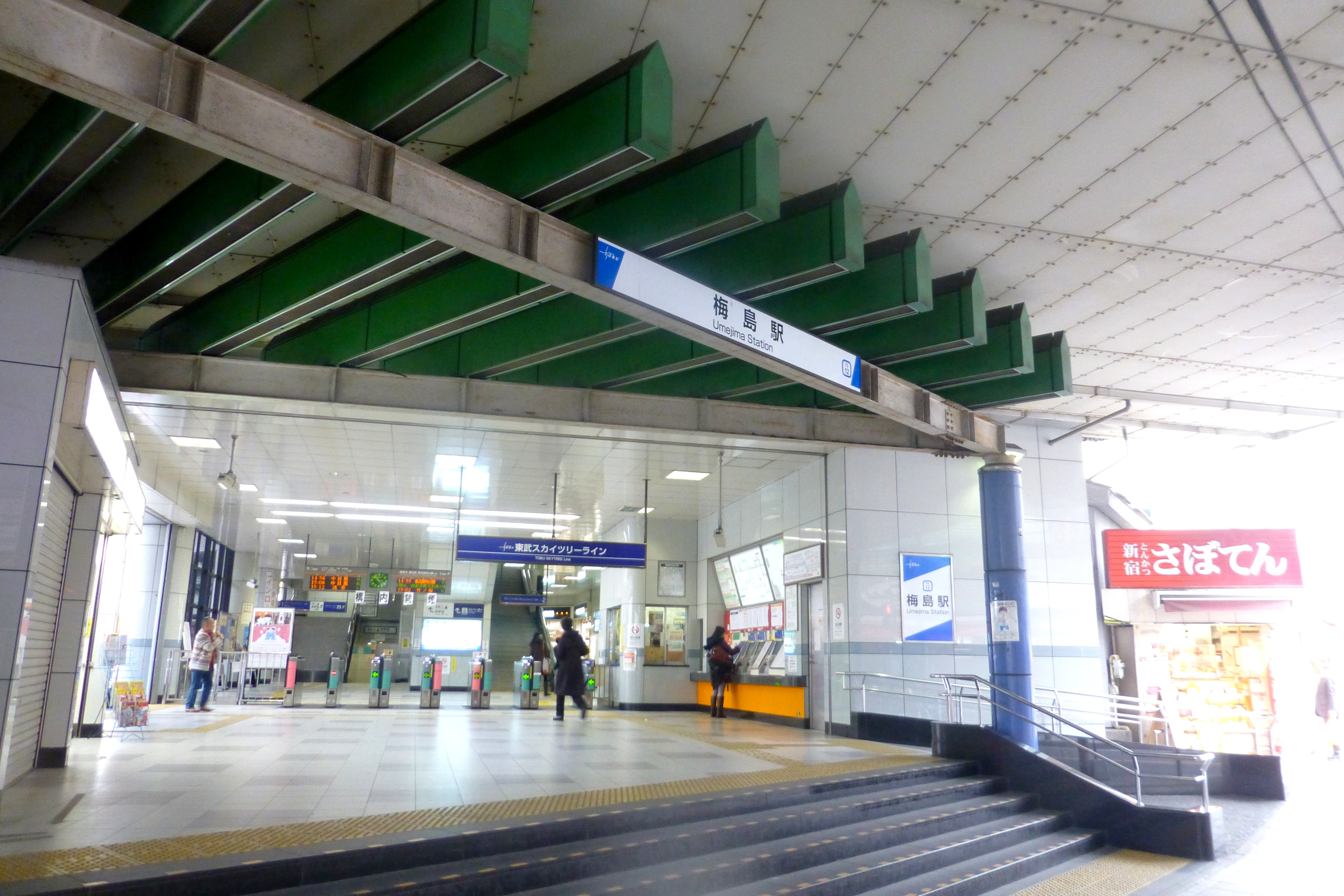
- The station entrance in March 2014

General information
- Location: Adachi, Tokyo; Japan
- Operator: Tobu Railway
- Line: Tobu Skytree Line
- Platforms: 1 island platform
- Tracks: 4

Other information
- Station code: TS-12

History
- Opened: 1 October 1924

Passengers
- FY2024: 17,806 daily boardings

Services
Preceding station	Tobu Railway	Following station
Gotanno TS11 towards Asakusa	Tobu Skytree Line Local	Nishiarai TS13 towards Tōbu-Dōbutsu-Kōen
Location
- Location within Tokyo Location within Japan

Umejima Station (梅島駅, Umejima-eki) is a railway station on the Tobu Skytree Line in Adachi, Tokyo, Japan, operated by the private railway operator Tobu Railway.

== Lines ==
Umejima Station is served by the Tobu Skytree Line, and is located 10.5 km from the line's Tokyo terminus at Asakusa. Only all-stations "Local" services stop at this station.

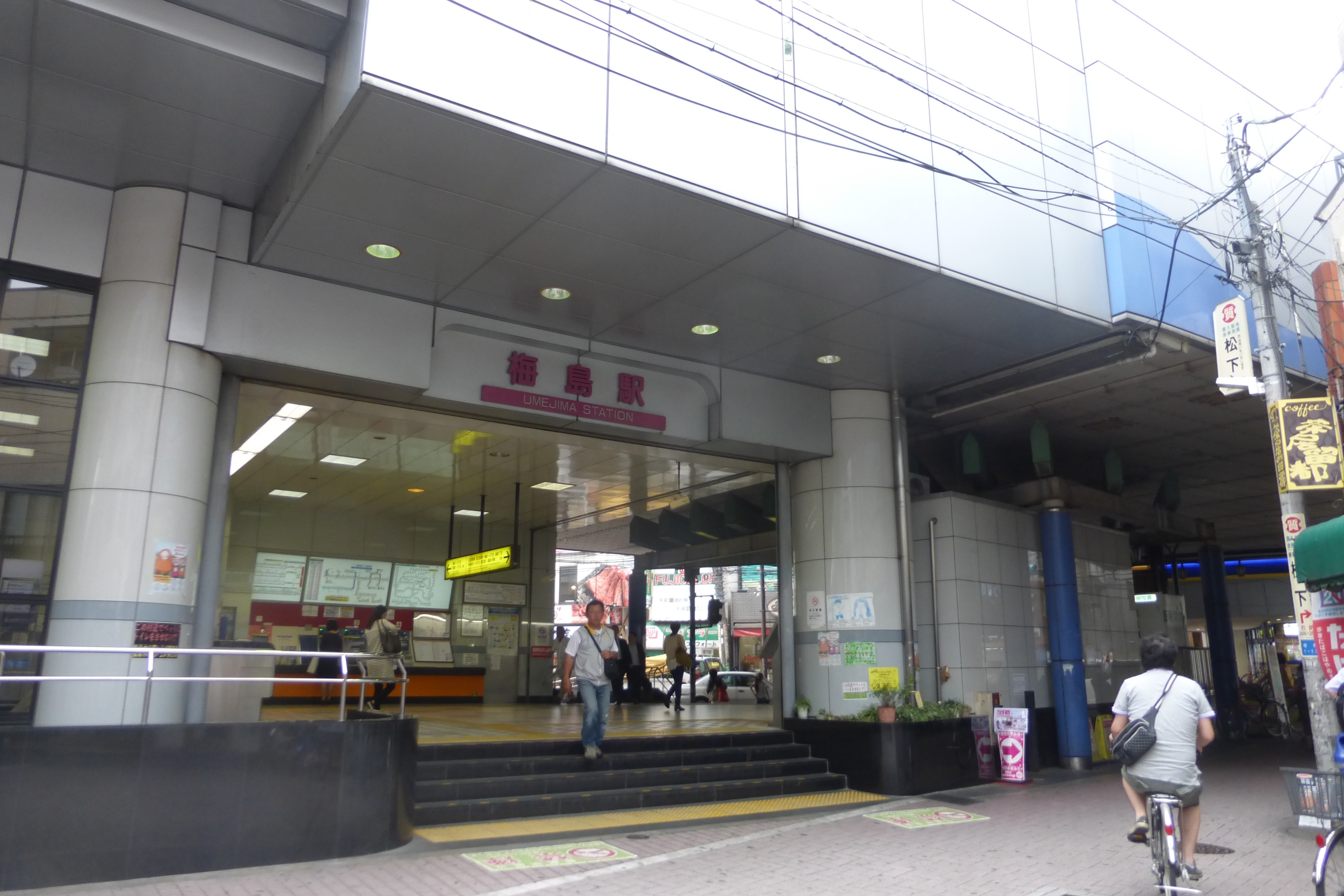
The east entrance in June 2015

== Station Layout ==
This station consists of an island platform serving two tracks. Express tracks are on the outside to allow trains to pass this station.

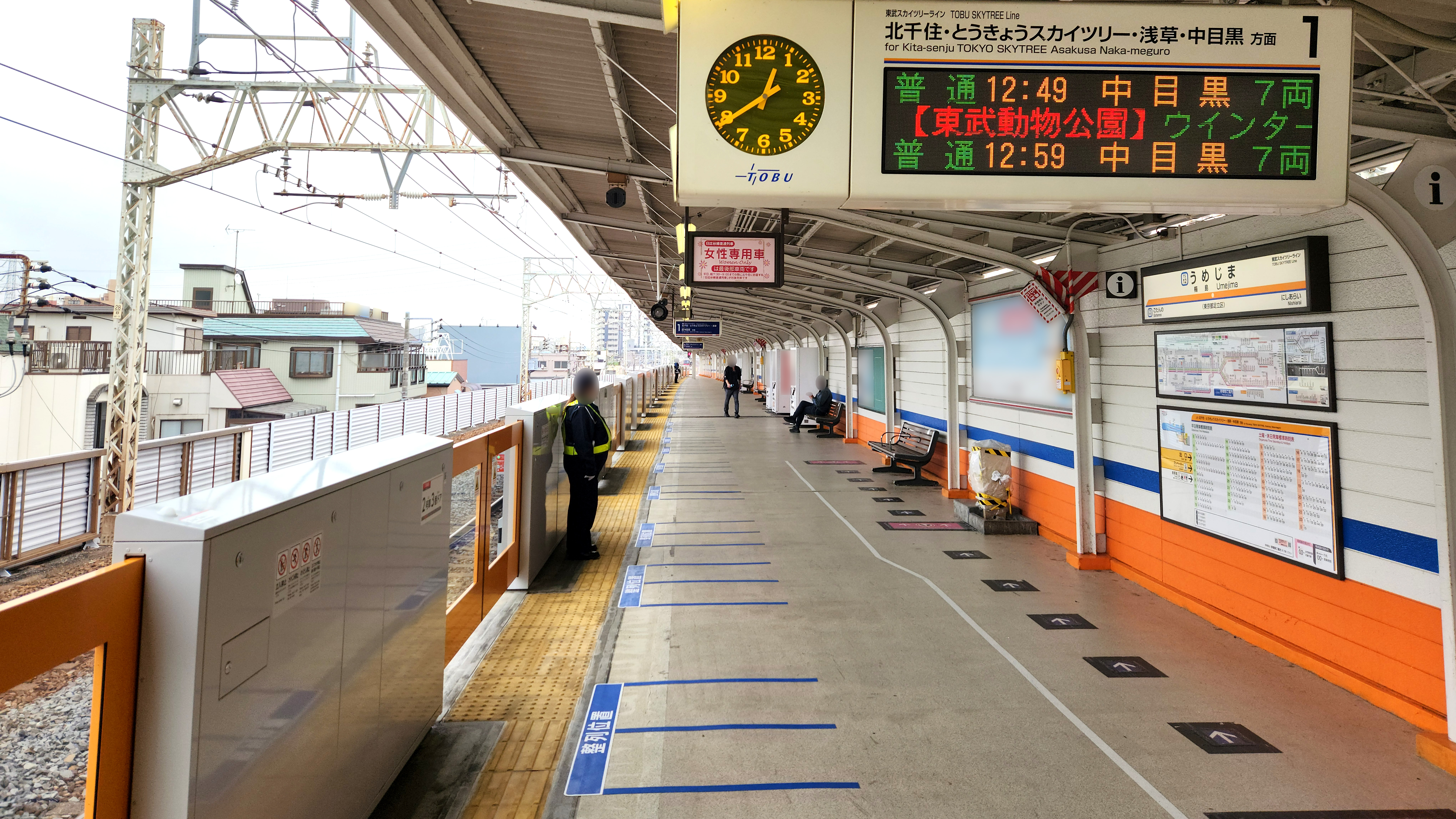
Platform 1 in November 2024

== History ==
The station opened on 1 October 1924.

== Passenger statistics ==
In fiscal 2024, the station was used by an average of 17,806 passengers daily (boarding passengers only).

== See also ==
- List of railway stations in Japan
