= List of mergers in Tochigi Prefecture =

Here is a list of mergers in Tochigi Prefecture, Japan since the Heisei era.

== Mergers from April 1, 1999 to Present ==
- On January 1, 2005 - the city of Kuroiso was merged with the towns of Nishinasuno and Shiobara (both from Nasu District) to create the city of Nasushiobara.
- On February 28, 2005 - the old city of Sano absorbed the towns of Kuzu and Tanuma (both from Aso District) to create the new and expanded city of Sano. Aso District was dissolved as a result of this merger.
- On March 28, 2005 - the towns of Kitsuregawa and Ujiie (both from Shioya District) were merged to create the city of Sakura.
- On October 1, 2005 - the towns of Batō and Ogawa (both from Nasu District) were merged to create the town of Nakagawa.
- On October 1, 2005 - the towns of Minaminasu and Karasuyama (from Nasu District) were merged to create the city of Nasukarasuyama.
- On October 1, 2005 - the town of Kurobane, and the village of Yuzukami (both from Nasu District) were merged into the expanded city of Ōtawara.
- On January 1, 2006 - the town of Awano (from Kamitsuga District) was merged into the expanded city of Kanuma.
- On January 10, 2006 - the town of Minamikawachi (from Kawachi District), and the towns of Ishibashi and Kokubunji (both from Shimotsuga District) were merged to create the city of Shimotsuke. (Merger Information Page)
- On March 20, 2006 - the old city of Nikkō absorbed the city of Imaichi, the town of Ashio (from Kamitsuga District), the town of Fujihara, and the village of Kuriyama (both from Shioya District) to create the new and expanded city of Nikkō. With this merger, there are no more villages left in Tochigi Prefecture.
- On March 31, 2007 - the towns of Kamikawachi and Kawachi (both from Kawachi District) were merged into the expanded city of Utsunomiya.
- On March 23, 2009 - the town of Ninomiya (from Haga District) was merged into the expanded city of Mooka.
- On March 29, 2010 - the old city of Tochigi absorbed the towns of Fujioka, Ōhira and Tsuga (all from Shimotsuga District) to create the new and expanded city of Tochigi.
- On October 1, 2011 - the town of Nishikata (from Kamitsuga District) was merged into the expanded city of Tochigi. Kamitsuga District was dissolved as a result of this merger.
- On April 5, 2014 - The town of Iwafune (from Shimotsuga District) was merged into the expanded city of Tochigi.
