= List of municipal flags of Kantō region =

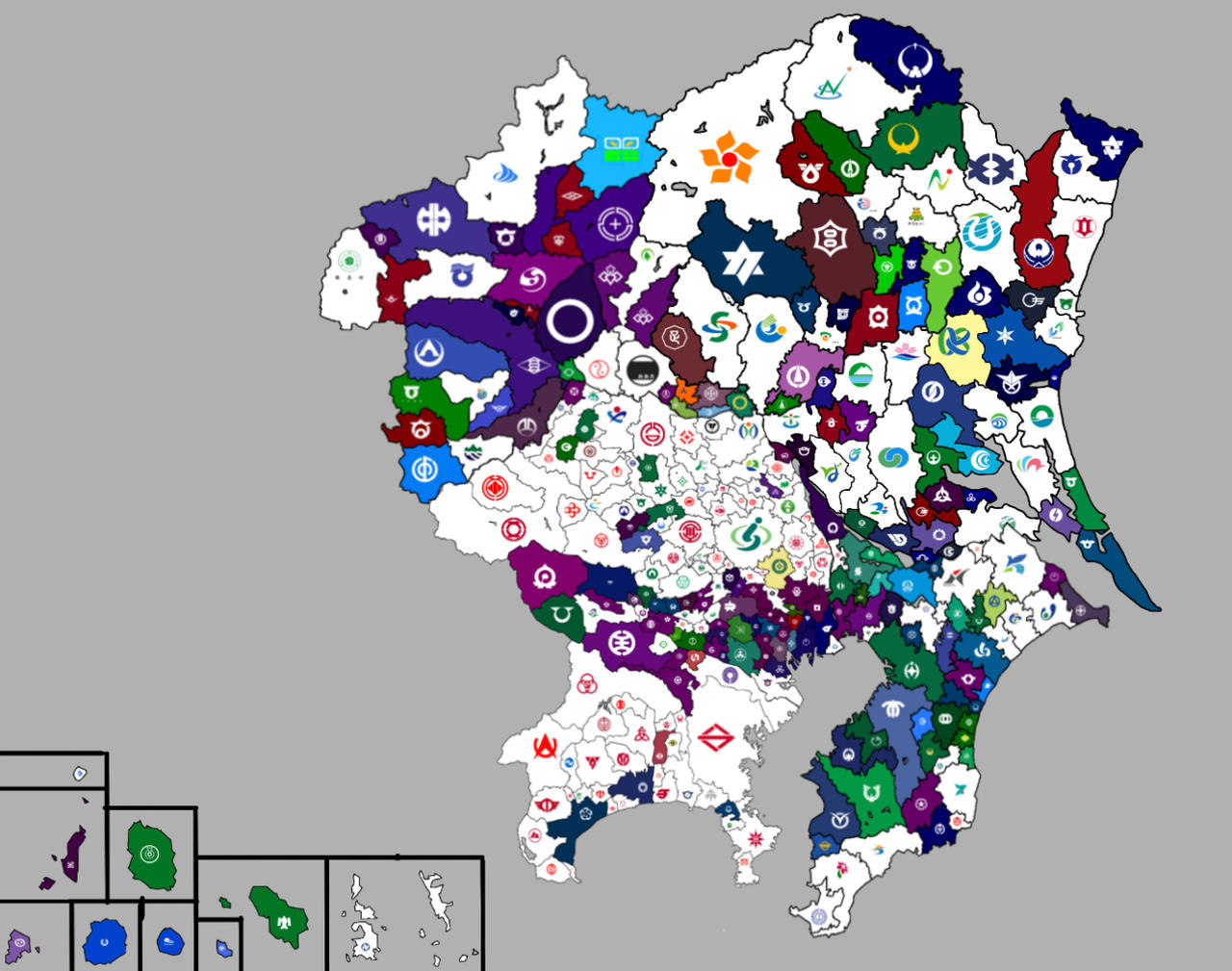
Flags of municipalities of Kantō region

This page lists the municipal flags of Kantō region, Japan. It is a part of the List of Japanese municipal flags, which is split into regions due to its size.

== Complete lists of Japanese municipal flags pages ==
The regions of Japan. From northeast to southwest: Hokkaidō (red), Tōhoku (yellow), Kantō (green), Chūbu (cyan), Kansai (violet), Chūgoku (orange), Shikoku (purple), and Kyūshū & Okinawa (grey).

- List of municipal flags of Hokkaidō
- List of municipal flags of Tōhoku region
- List of municipal flags of Kantō region
- List of municipal flags of Chūbu region
- List of municipal flags of Kansai region
- List of municipal flags of Chūgoku region
- List of municipal flags of Shikoku
- List of municipal flags of Kyūshū

== Chiba Prefecture ==
=== Cities ===
Abiko

Asahi

Chiba

Chōshi

Funabashi

Futtsu

Ichihara

Ichikawa

Inzai

Isumi

Kamagaya

Kamogawa

Kashiwa

Katori

Katsuura

Kimitsu

Kisarazu

Matsudo

Minamibōsō

Mobara

Nagareyama

Narashino

Narita

Noda

Ōamishirasato

Sakura

Sanmu

Shiroi

Sodegaura

Sōsa

Tateyama

Tomisato

Tōgane

Urayasu

Yachimata

Yachiyo

Yotsukaidō

=== Towns and villages ===
Chōnan

Chōsei

Ichinomiya

Kōzaki

Kujūkuri

Kyonan

Mutsuzawa

Nagara

Onjuku

Ōtaki

Sakae

Shibayama

Shirako

Shisui

Tako

Tōnoshō

Yokoshibahikari

=== Historical ===
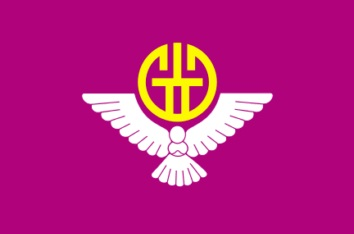
Hikari (1964–2006)

Hirakawa (1965–1971)

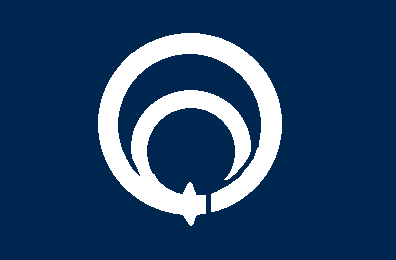
Matsuo (1959–2006)

Miyoshi (1973–2006)

Narita (1954–2006)

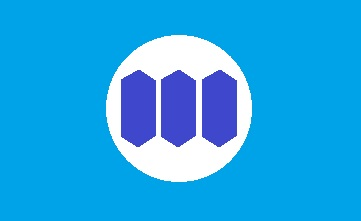
Omigawa (1971–2006)

Taiei (1974–2006)

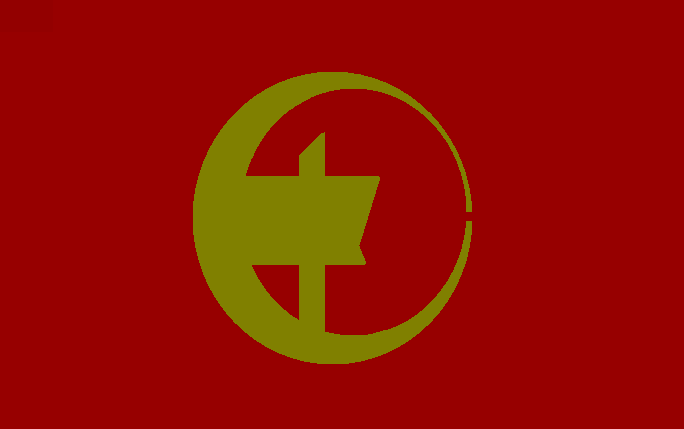
Toke (1968–1969)

Wada (1981–2006)

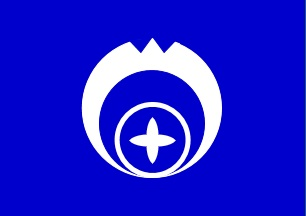
Yamada (1966–2006)

Yokoshiba (1987–2006)

== Gunma Prefecture ==
=== Cities ===
Annaka

Fujioka

Isesaki

Kiryū

Maebashi

Midori

Numata

Ōta

Shibukawa

Takasaki

Tatebayashi

Tomioka

=== Towns and villages ===
Chiyoda

Higashiagatsuma

Itakura

Kanna

Kanra

Katashina

Kawaba

Kusatsu

Meiwa

Minakami

Naganohara

Nanmoku

Nakanojō

Ōizumi

Ōra

Shimonita

Shintō

Shōwa

Takayama

Tamamura

Tsumagoi

Ueno

Yoshioka

== Ibaraki Prefecture ==
=== Cities ===
Bando

Chikusei

Hitachi

Hitachinaka

Hitachiōmiya

Hitachiōta

Hokota

Inashiki

Ishioka

Itako

Jōsō

Kamisu

Kasama

Kashima

Kasumigaura

Kitaibaraki

Koga

Moriya

Mito

Naka

Namegata

Omitama

Ryūgasaki

Sakuragawa

Shimotsuma

Takahagi

Toride

Tsuchiura

Tsukuba

Tsukubamirai

Ushiku

Yūki

=== Towns and villages ===
Ami

Daigo

Goka

Ibaraki

Kawachi

Miho

Ōarai

Sakai

Shirosato

Tōkai

Tone

Yachiyo

=== Historical ===
Akeno (1956–2005)

Iwai (1971–2005)

== Kanagawa Prefecture ==
=== Cities ===
Atsugi

Ayase

Chigasaki

Ebina

Fujisawa

Hadano

Hiratsuka

Isehara

Kamakura

Kawasaki

Minamiashigara

Miura

Odawara

Sagamihara

Yamato

Yokohama

Yokosuka

Zama

Zushi

=== Towns and villages ===
Aikawa

Hakone

Hayama

Kaisei

Kiyokawa

Manazuru

Matsuda

Nakai

Ninomiya

Ōi

Ōiso

Samukawa

Yamakita

Yugawara

== Saitama Prefecture ==
=== Cities ===
Ageo

Asaka

Chichibu

Fujimi

Fujimino

Fukaya

Gyōda

Hannō

Hanyū

Hasuda

Hidaka

Higashimatsuyama

Honjō

Iruma

Kasukabe

Kawagoe

Kawaguchi

Kazo

Kitamoto

Kōnosu

Koshigaya

Kuki

Kumagaya

Misato (city)

Niiza

Okegawa

Saitama

Sakado

Satte

Sayama

Shiki

Shiraoka

Sōka

Toda

Tokorozawa

Tsurugashima

Wakō

Warabi

Yashio

Yoshikawa

=== Towns and villages ===
Hatoyama

Higashichichibu

Ina

Kamikawa

Kamisato

Kawajima

Matsubushi

Minano

Misato

Miyashiro

Miyoshi

Moroyama

Nagatoro

Namegawa

Ogano

Ogawa

Ogose

Ranzan

Sugito

Tokigawa

Yokoze

Yorii

Yoshimi

=== Utopian communities ===
Atarashiki-mura

=== Historical ===
Honjo (1981–2006)

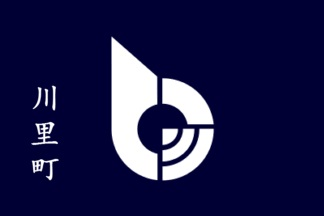
Kawazato (1987–2005)

Konosu (1954–2021)

Kuki (1977–2010)

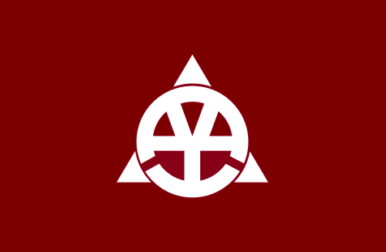
Okabe (1977–2006)

Omiya (1981–2001)

== Tochigi Prefecture ==
=== Cities ===
Ashikaga

Kanuma

Mooka

Nasukarasuyama

Nasushiobara

Nikkō

Otawara

Oyama

Sakura

Sano

Shimotsuke

Tochigi

Utsunomiya

Yaita

=== Towns ===
Haga

Ichikai

Kaminokawa

Mashiko

Mibu

Motegi

Nasu

Nakagawa

Nogi

Shioya

Takanezawa

=== Historical ===
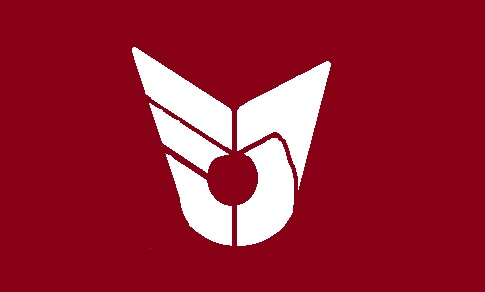
Ashio

Awano

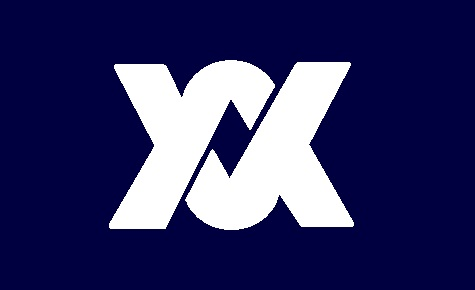
Bato

Fujioka

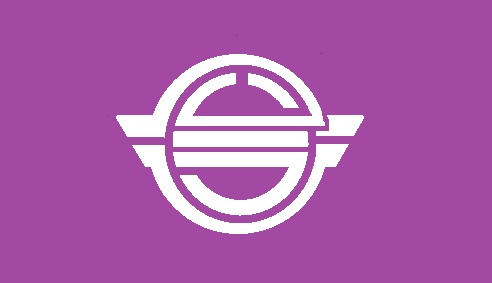
Fujihara

Imaichi

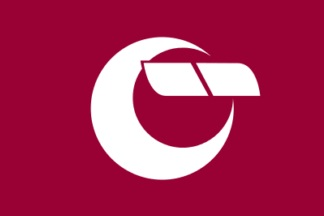
Ishibashi

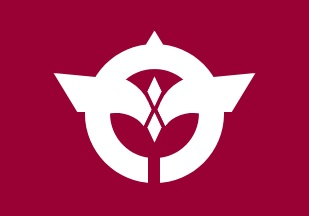
Iwafune

Kamikawachi

Karasuyama

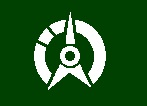
Kawachi

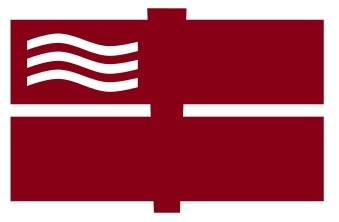
Kitsuregawa

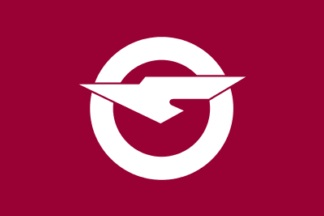
Kokubunji

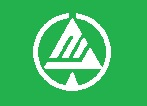
Kuriyama

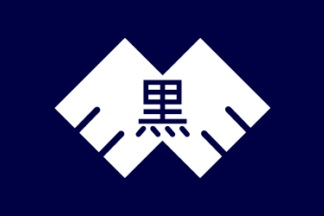
Kurohane

Kuroiso

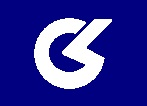
Kuzu

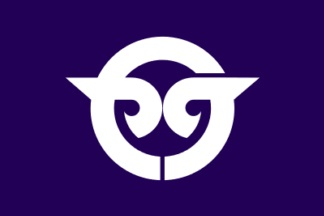
Minamikawachi

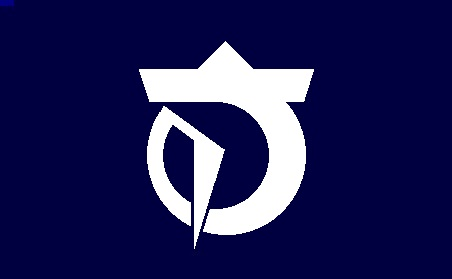
Minaminasu

Nikko

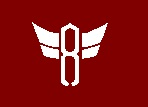
Nimomiya

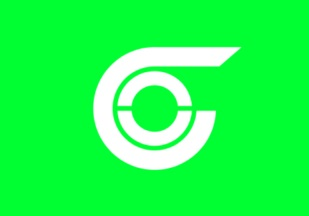
Nishikata

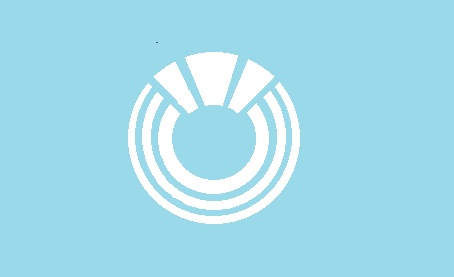
Ogawa

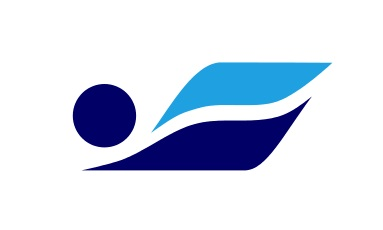
Ohira

Sano

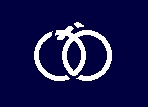
Shiobara

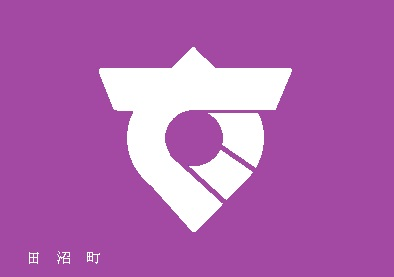
Tanuma

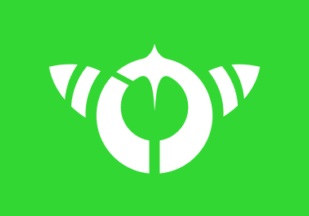
Tsuga

Tochigi

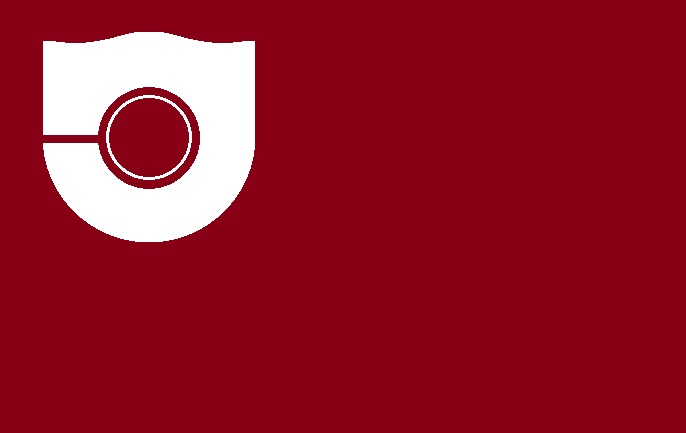
Ujiie

Yuzukami

== Tokyo Metropolis ==
Tokyo (details)

Tokyo (Symbol flag)

=== Special wards ===
Adachi

Arakawa

Bunkyō

Chiyoda

Chūō

Edogawa

Itabashi

Katsushika

Kita

Kōtō

Meguro

Minato

Nakano

Nerima

Ōta

Setagaya

Shibuya

Shinagawa

Shinjuku

Suginami

Sumida

Taitō

Toshima

=== Cities ===
Akiruno

Akishima

Chōfu

Fuchū

Fussa

Hachiōji

Hamura

Higashikurume

Higashimurayama

Higashiyamato

Hino

Inagi

Kiyose

Kodaira

Koganei

Kokubunji

Komae

Kunitachi

Machida

Mitaka

Musashimurayama

Musashino

Nishitōkyō

Ōme

Tachikawa

Tama

=== Towns and villages ===
Aogashima

Hachijō

Hinode

Hinohara

Kōzushima

Mikurajima

Miyake

Mizuho

Niijima

Ogasawara

Okutama

Ōshima

Toshima

=== Historical ===
Akigawa (1964–1992)

Akigawa (1992–1995)

Hōya (1967–2001)

Itsukaichi (1965–1995)

Tanashi (1967–2001)
