= List of cities in Tochigi Prefecture by population =

The following list sorts all cities (including towns) in the Japanese prefecture of Tochigi with a population of more than 10,000 according to the 2020 Census. As of October 1, 2020, 14 places fulfill this criterion and are listed here. This list refers only to the population of individual cities, towns and villages within their defined limits, which does not include other municipalities or suburban areas within urban agglomerations.

The following table lists the 14 cities and towns in Tochigi with a population of at least 10,000 on October 1, 2020, according to the 2020 Census. The table also gives an overview of the evolution of the population since the 1995 census.

Rank (2020)	Name	Status	2020	2015	2010	2005	2000	1995
1	Utsunomiya	City	519,026	518,594	511,739	502,396	487,560	477,215
2	Oyama	City	166,791	166,760	164,454	160,150	155,198	150,115
3	Tochigi	City	155,628	159,211	164,024	168,763	171,755	174,305
4	Ashikaga	City	144,796	149,452	154,530	159,756	163,140	165,828
5	Sano	City	116,220	118,919	121,249	123,926	125,671	128,099
6	Nasushiobara	City	115,282	117,146	117,812	115,032	110,828	105,127
7	Kanuma	City	94,074	98,374	102,348	104,148	104,764	104,019
8	Mooka	City	78,221	79,539	82,289	83,002	81,530	80,643
9	Nikkō	City	77,651	83,386	90,066	94,291	98,143	99,988
10	Ōtawara	City	72,123	75,457	77,729	79,023	78,993	77,063
11	Shimotsuke	City	59,479	59,431	59,483	59,132	57,447	54,709
12	Sakura	City	44,541	44,901	44,768	41,383	40,030	38,289
13	Mibu	Town	39,509	39,951	39,605	40,107	39,853	39,823
14	Yaita	City	31,175	33,354	35,343	35,685	36,466	36,650
15	Kaminokawa	Town	30,810	31,046	31,621	31,592	29,421	27,700
16	Takanezawa	Town	29,253	29,639	30,436	30,915	29,777	27,785
17	Nogi	Town	24,906	25,292	25,720	25,907	26,674	26,489
18	Nasukarasuyama	City	24,886	27,047	29,206	31,152	32,790	33,535
19	Nasu	Town	24,021	24,919	26,765	26,693	27,027	26,748
20	Mashiko	Town	21,906	23,281	24,348	25,080	25,685	25,255
21	Nakagawa	Town	15,226	16,964	18,446	19,865	20,999	21,774
22	Haga	Town	14,968	15,189	16,030	16,367	16,988	17,424
23	Motegi	Town	11,899	13,188	15,018	16,403	17,466	18,532
24	Ichikai	Town	11,259	11,720	12,094	12,401	12,441	12,546
25	Shioya	Town	10,366	11,495	12,560	13,462	14,171	14,729
