= Japan National Route 293 =

National highway in Japan

National Route 293
- 国道293号
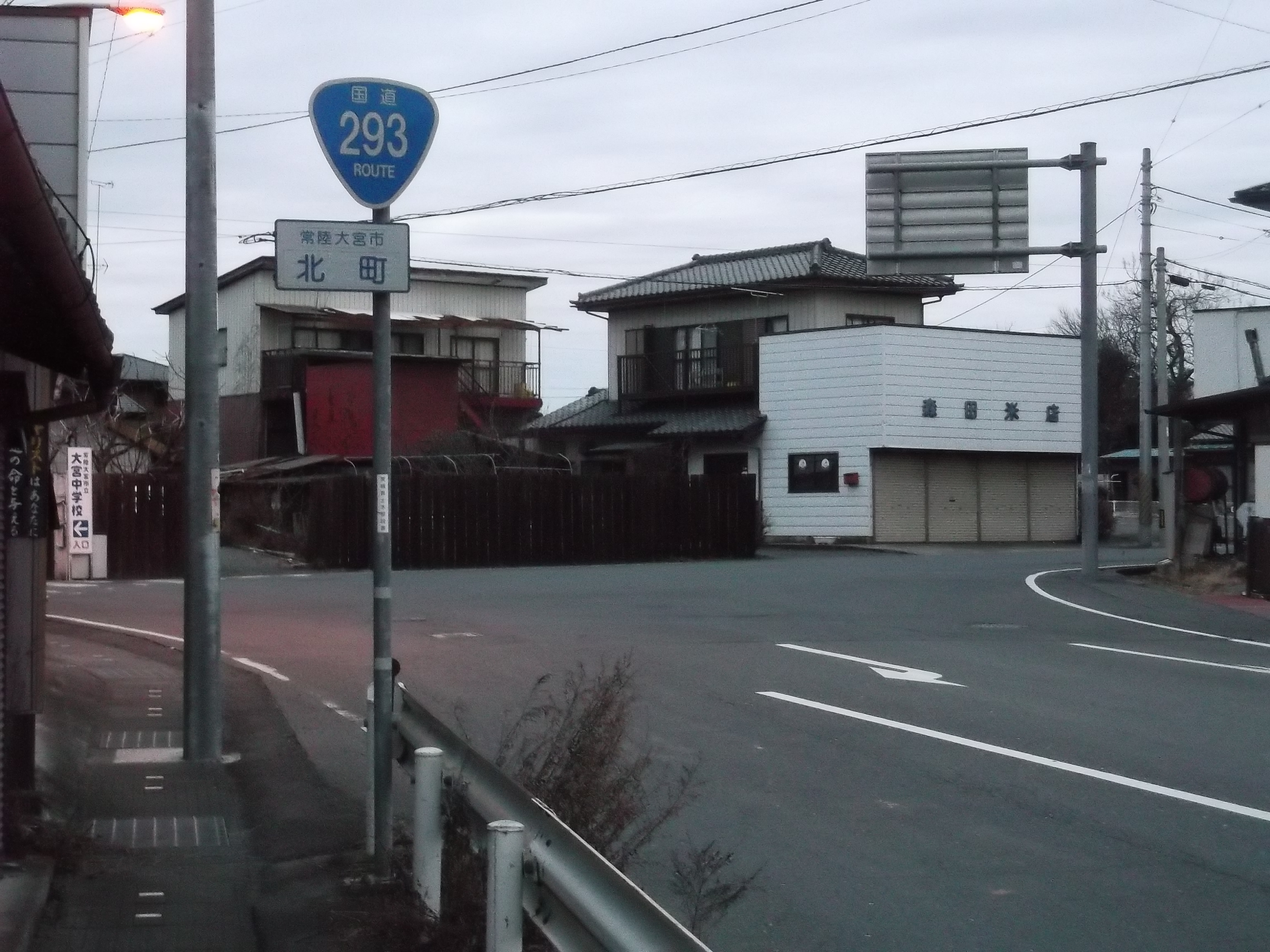

Route information
- Length: 164.2 km (102.0 mi)

Location
- Country: Japan

Highway system
- National highways of Japan; Expressways of Japan
| ← National Route 292 | → National Route 294 |

National Route 293 is a national highway of Japan connecting Hitachi, Ibaraki and Ashikaga, Tochigi in Japan, with a total length of 164.2 km (102.03 mi). It begins as an intersection with Japan National Route 245 in Hitachi, and runs inland through Hitachiōta, Hitachiōmiya, Bato, Ogawa, Ujiie, Utsunomiya, and Kanuma, finally reaching Ashikaga.
