= Hunter Mountain Shiobara =

Ski area in Tochigi Prefecture, Japan

Coordinates: 36°56′17.94″N 139°45′13.13″E

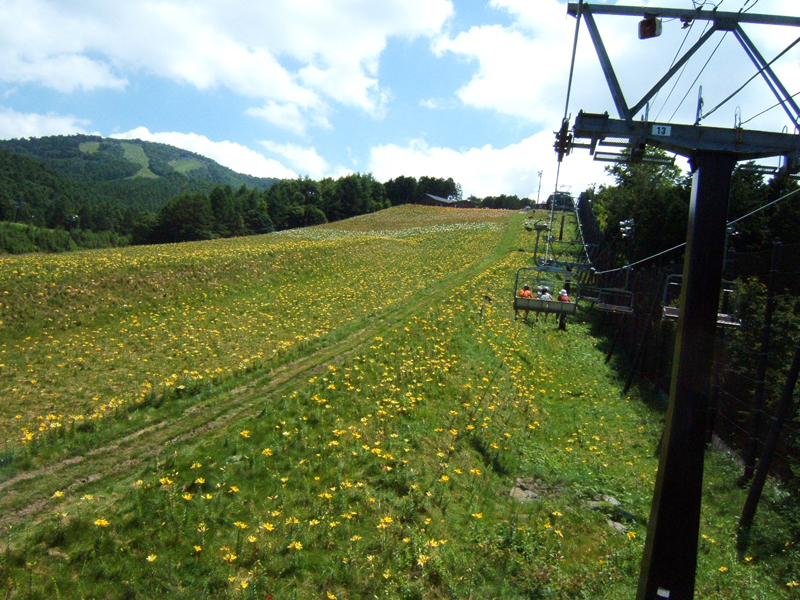
- Hunter Mountain Shiobara in Summer.
- Interactive map of Hunter Mountain Shiobara
- Location: Nasushiobara, Tochigi Prefecture, Japan
- Vertical: 500 m (1,640 ft)
- Top elevation: 1,638 m (5,374 ft)
- Base elevation: 1,138 m (3,734 ft)
- Skiable area: 0.42 km^{2} (103.8 acres)
- Trails: 37
- Longest run: 3.0 kilometres (1.9 mi)
- Lift system: 8 (1 gondola lifts, 2 quad chairlifts, and 5 pair chairlifts)
- Lift capacity: 12,900 per hour
- Website: http://www.hunter.co.jp/winter

Hunter Mountain Shiobara (ハンターマウンテン塩原, Hantā Maunten Shiobara) is a ski area in Nasushiobara, Tochigi Prefecture, Japan, which was developed by the owners of Hunter Mountain in New York.

It is the largest snow resort in the Tokyo Metropolitan Area. From Nasushiobara, the nearest train station, there is a free bus shuttle to Hunter Mountain. Some of the runs were updated to 1000m in 2017. It is open all through the year. Currently, it boasts of 12 courses including the longer 3,000m run.

== See also ==
- List of ski areas and resorts in Asia
