= Symbols of Tokyo =

Tokyo's crest (left) and symbol (right)

The Japanese city of Tokyo has two official emblems: the crest (紋章, monshō) and the symbol (シンボルマーク, Shinborumāku). The crest is a six-rayed stylized sun with a dot in the center, while the symbol is a stylised Ginkgo biloba leaf.

The city has two official flags, featuring each emblem.

== Metropolitan crest ==
The Crest of the Tokyo Metropolis (東京都紋章, Tōkyō-to Monshō) was adopted on November 2, 1943, under the Metropolitan Announcement No. 464 (告示第464号). It is same as the crest of the former Tokyo City, decided by the city council in December 1889. It is believed to be designed by Hiromoto Watanabe (渡辺洪基, Watanabe Hiromoto), an alderman of the city.

The crest shows a six-rayed sun (which, as a red-filled circle without rays or a dot, is in the center of the national flag of Japan), with a dot in the center representing Tokyo as the metaphorical center of Japan. As with most other prefectural crests in Japan, its color is not designated. The crest can also be interpreted as a version of the kanji 東 (tō) or 京 (kyō) of 東京 (Tokyo), but the metropolitan announcement does not explain as such.

=== As a flag ===
Tokyo Metropolis
- Proportion: 2:3
- Adopted: October 1, 1964
- Design: A white Metropolitan Crest on an Edo purple background.
- Designed by: Hiromoto Watanabe (emblem)

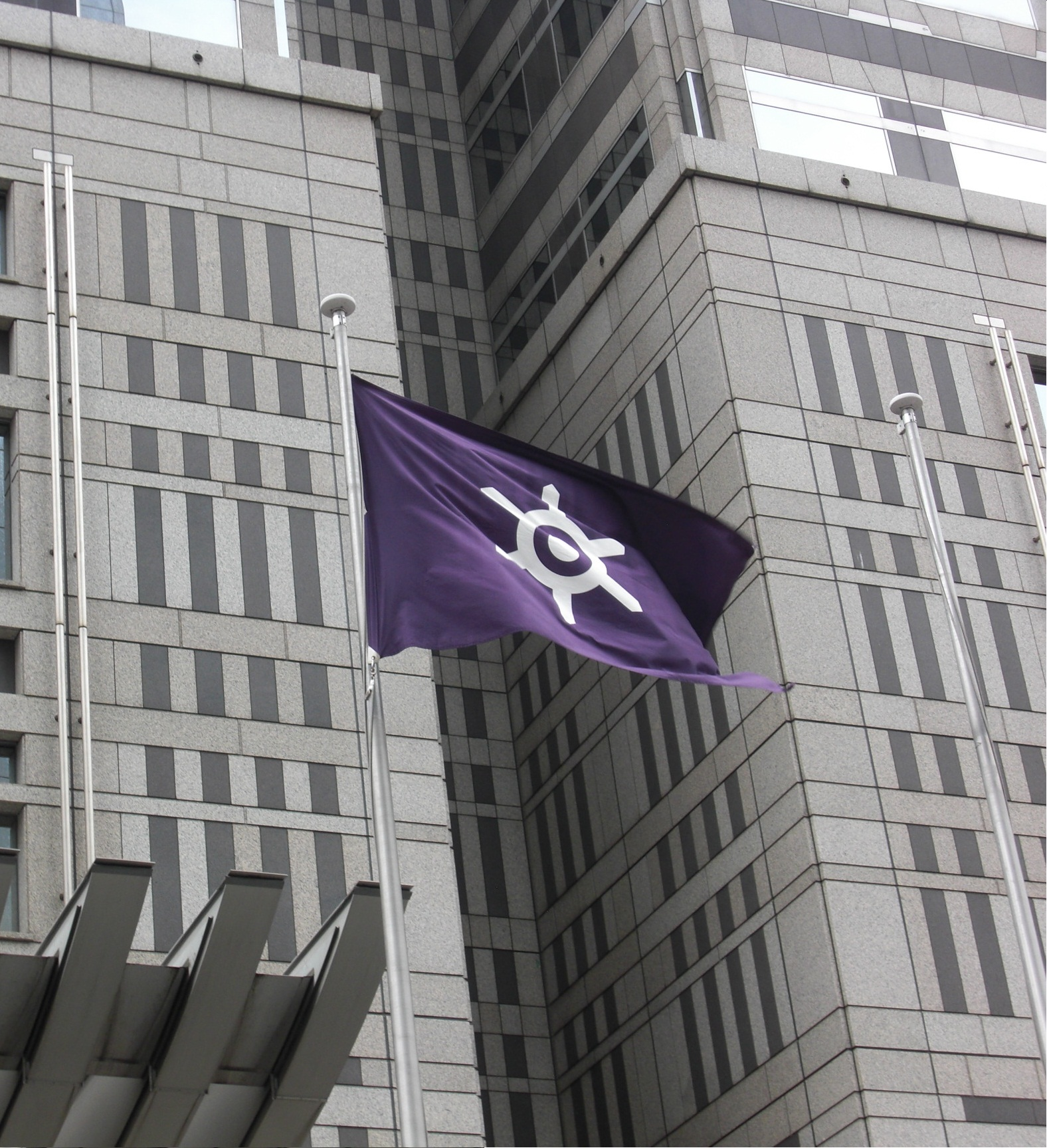
As flown in the Tokyo Metropolitan Government Building No. 2

The Flag of the Tokyo Metropolis (東京都旗, Tōkyō-to-ki) was adopted on October 1, 1964, under the Metropolitan Announcement No. 1042 (告示第1042号). It features a white Metropolitan Crest on center. The background color is Edo purple (江戸紫, Edo murasaki), which was popular in Edo, the name of Tokyo during the Edo period. This shade of purple is one of the traditional colors of Japan, and is near identical to Web Indigo.

== Metropolitan symbol ==
The Symbol of the Tokyo Metropolis (東京都のシンボルマーク, Tōkyō-to no Shinboru-māku; lit. 'Symbol mark of the Tokyo Metropolis') was adopted on June 1, 1989, under the Metropolitan Announcement No. 577 (告示第577号).

The design was selected by the Tokyo Metropolitan Symbol Selection Committee (東京都シンボルマーク選考委員会) from 20 candidates. The winning design was created by Rei Yoshimura (レイ吉村), a professional graphic designer.

The vivid green symbol consists of three arcs combined to resemble a leaf of the ginkgo, the metropolitan tree, and represents T for Tokyo.

=== As a flag ===
Tokyo Metropolis (Symbol Flag)
- Proportion: 2:3
- Adopted: September 30, 1989
- Design: A vivid green Metropolitan Symbol on white background.
- Designed by: Rei Yoshimura (emblem)

The Symbol Flag of the Tokyo Metropolis (東京都シンボル旗, Tōkyō-to Shinboru-ki) was adopted on September 30, 1989, under the Metropolitan Announcement No. 978 (告示第978号). It features a vivid green Metropolitan Symbol in its center. The background color is white.

== Uses ==
Both emblems and their corresponding flags are the official insignias of Tokyo. The Metropolitan Crest and the Metropolitan Flag are older and are used on more formal occasions. They are also used on traditional or historical objects, as well as on older objects made before the Metropolitan Symbol was created.

On the other hand, currently, the Metropolitan Symbol and the Metropolitan Symbol Flag are more commonly used, including on its official website and on metropolitan-operated buses and trains.

== Gallery ==
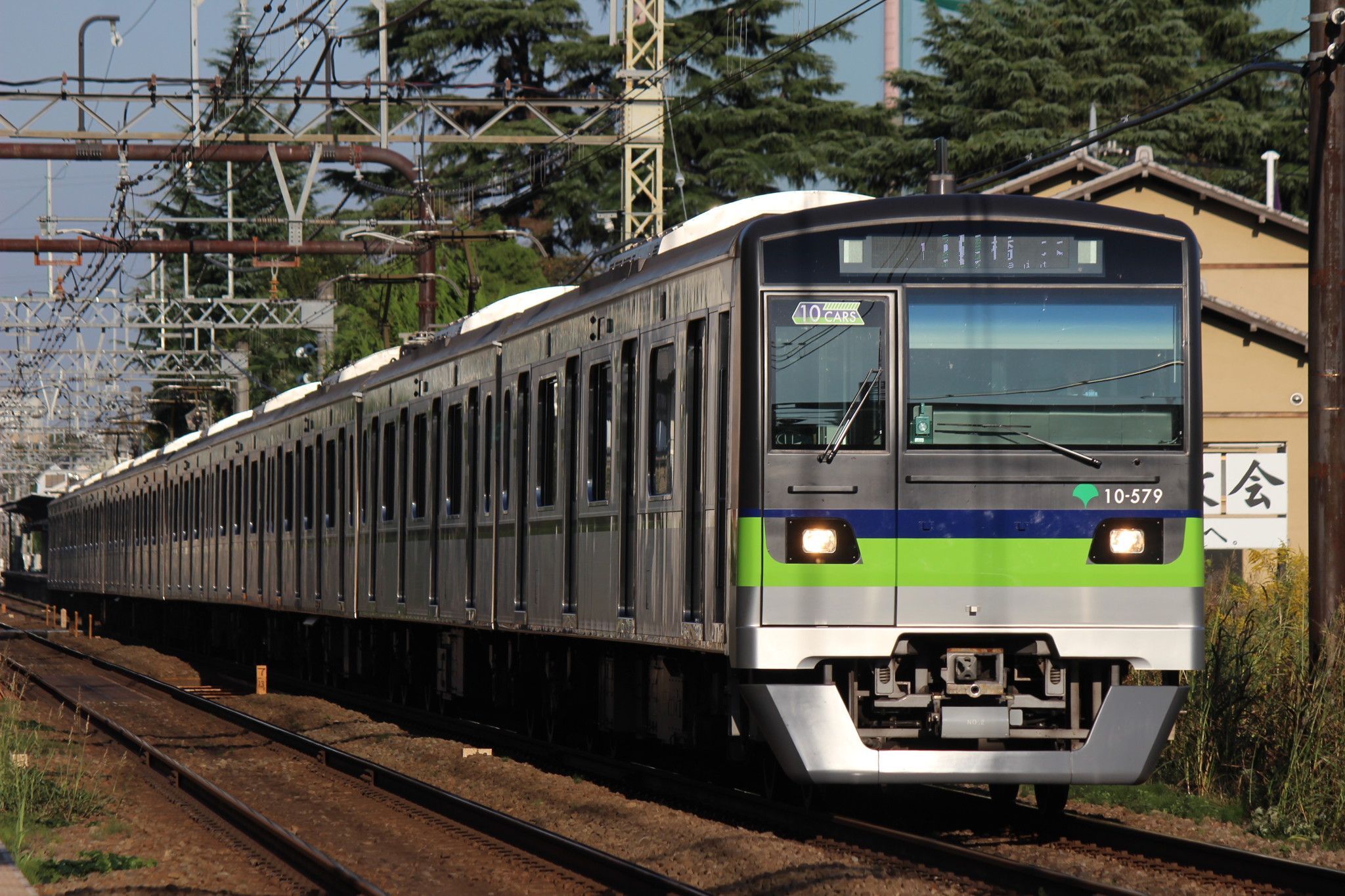
Toei Subway train with the Metropolitan Symbol

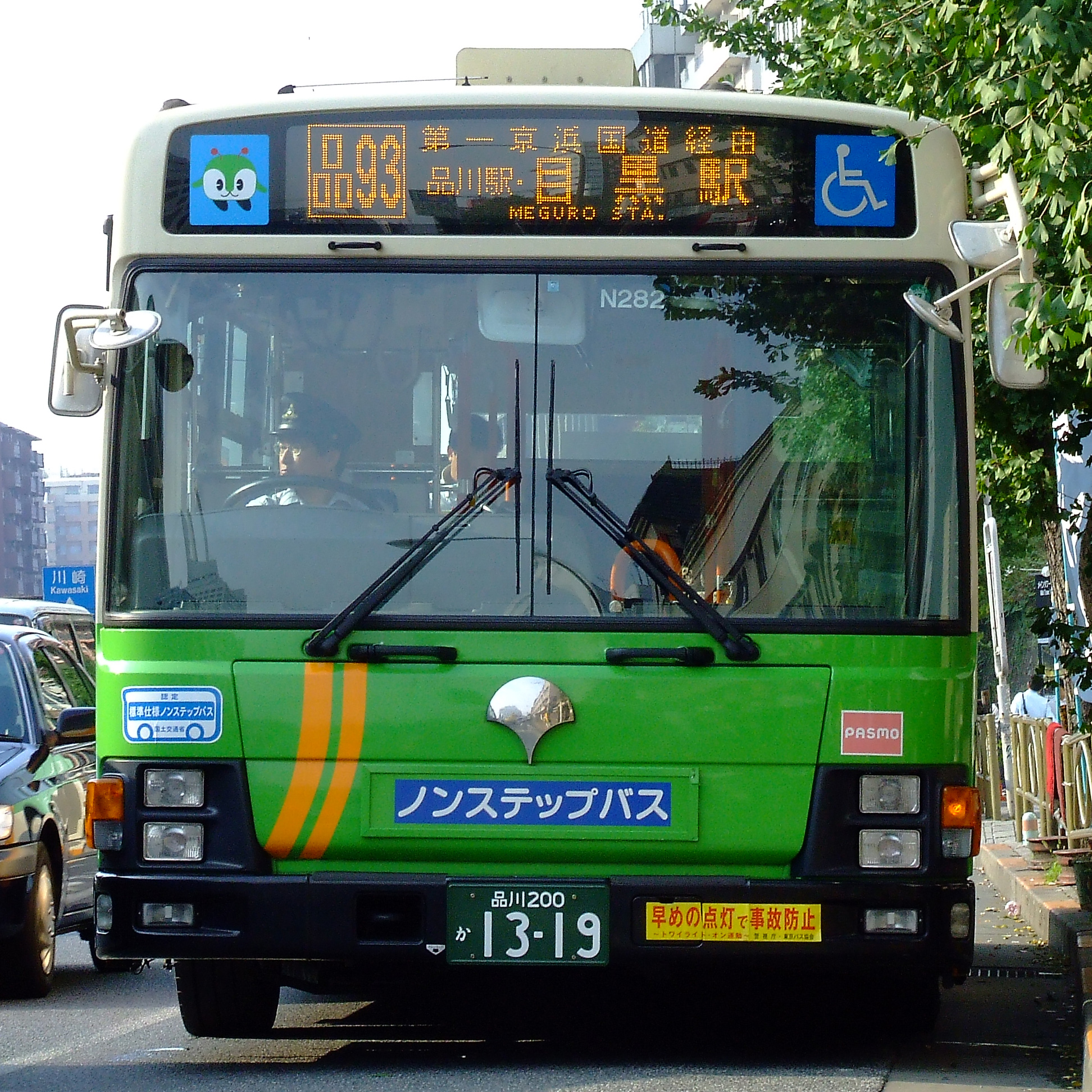
Toei Bus with a chrome Metropolitan Symbol

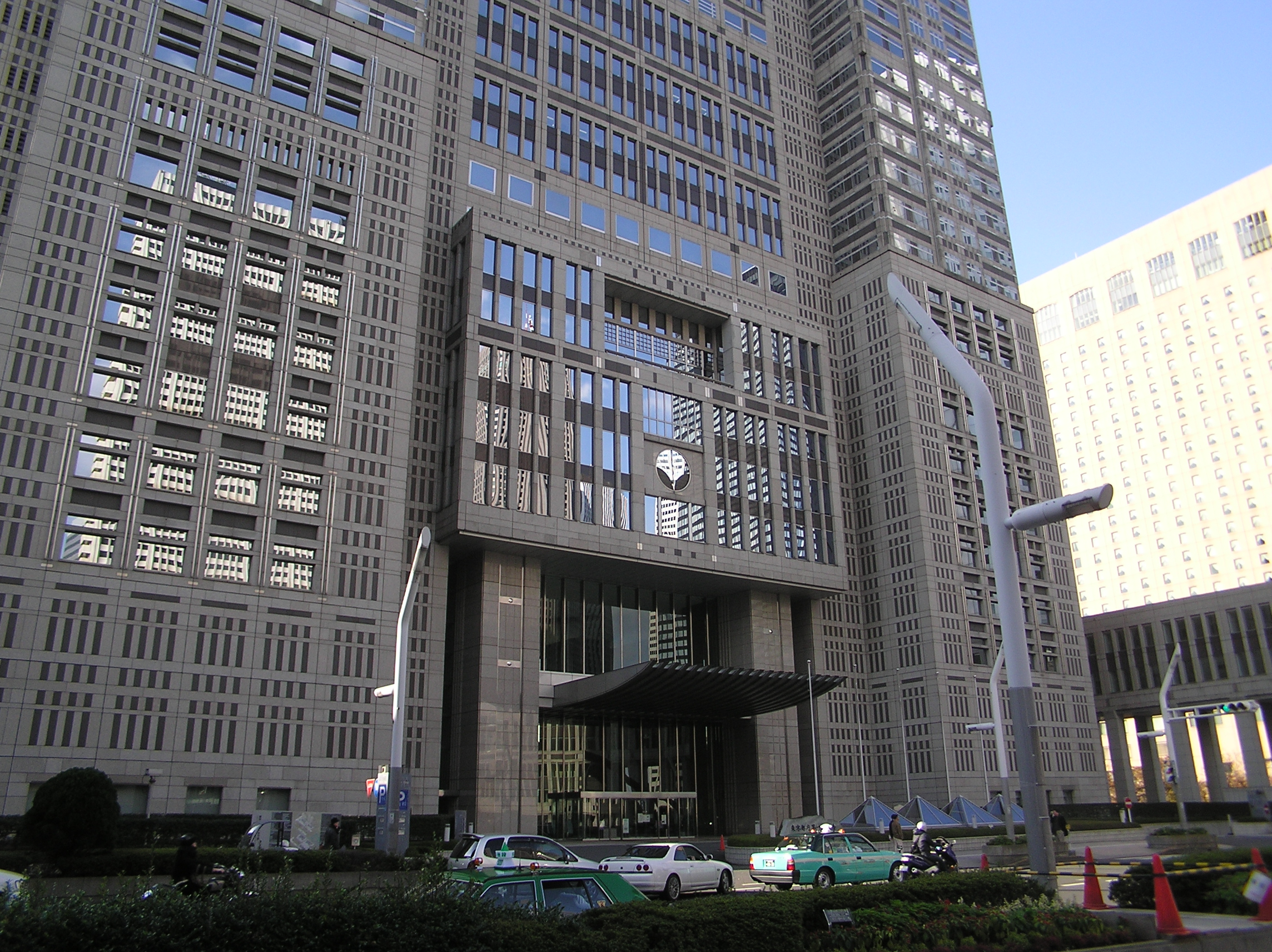
The gate of the Tokyo Metropolitan Government Building, with windows shaped as the Metropolitan Symbol

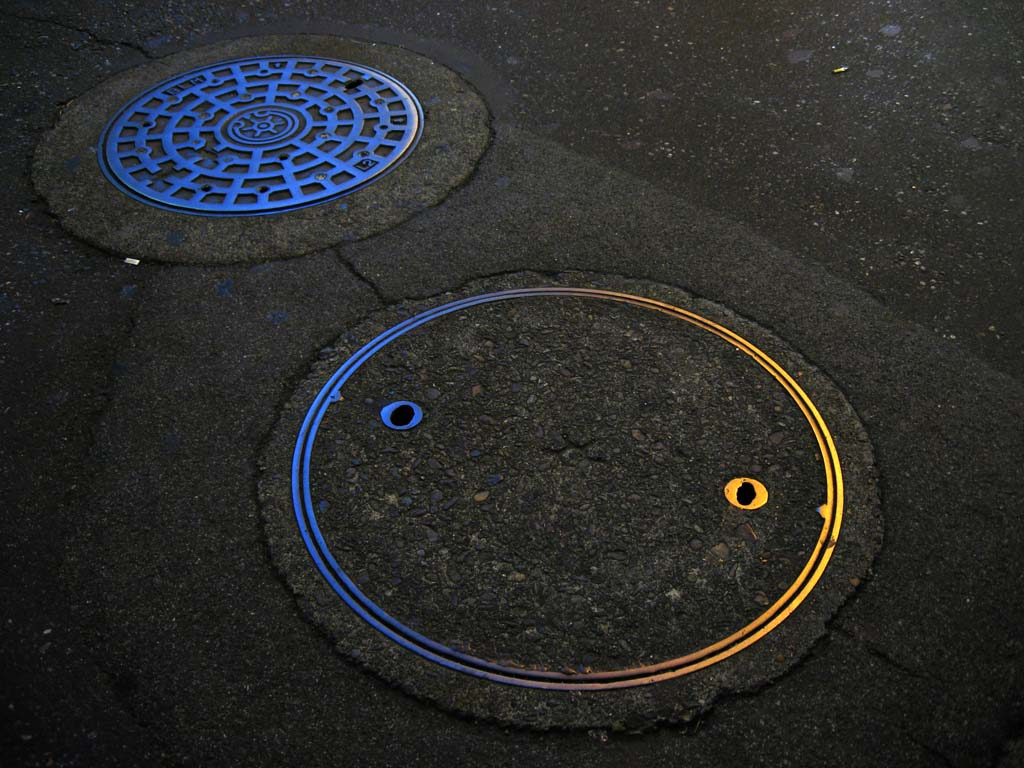
Manhole covers with the Metropolitan Crest

== See also ==
- List of Japanese flags
- List of municipal flags of Kantō region § Tokyo Metropolis
