= Karasuyama Castle =

Coordinates: 36°39′50″N 140°08′51″E

Karasuyama Castle 烏山城
- Nasukarasuyama, Tochigi Prefecture, Japan
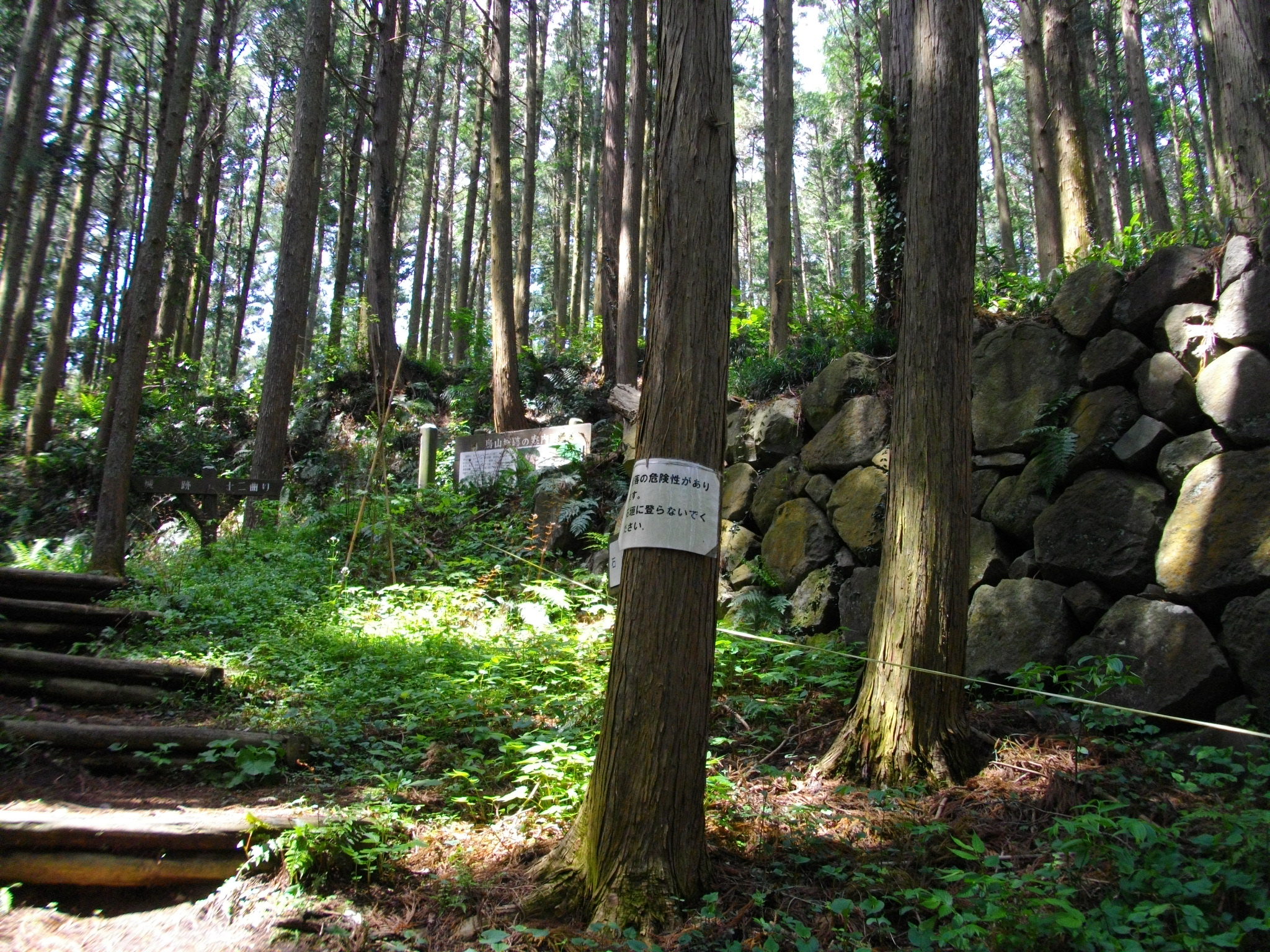
- ruins of Karasuyama Castle

Site information
- Type: mountain-style Japanese castle
- Open to the public: yes

Location

Site history
- Built: 1418
- Built by: Nasu Sukeshige
- In use: Sengoku-Edo period
- Demolished: 1873

Karasuyama Castle (烏山城, Karasuyama -jō) is a Japanese castle located in Nasukarasuyama, northern Tochigi Prefecture, Japan. At the end of the Edo period, Karasuyama Castle was home to a branch of the Ōkubo clan, daimyō of Karasuyama Domain. It was also called the Cactus Castle (臥牛, Gagyu- jō)

== History ==
Karasuyama Castle was originally built by Nasu Sukeshige in 1418 and was the primary residence of the Nasu clan from 1514 to the end of the Sengoku period. The castle resisted repeated attacks by the Satake clan and other enemies of the Nasu, but was never taken in battle. However, in 1590, partly for failing to participate in the 1590 Battle of Odawara, Toyotomi Hideyoshi divided the Nasu holdings, and awarding their ancestral castle temporarily to Oda Nobukatsu, one of the surviving sons of Oda Nobunaga. With the establishment of the Tokugawa shogunate, Karasuyama Castle became the center of the 20,000 koku Karasuyama Domain, ruled by a succession of daimyo clans (Narita, Matsushita, Hori, and Itakura) before it was awarded in 1725 to a junior branch of the Ōkubo clan. Most of the castle buildings were reconstructed in 1659 by Hori Chikayoshi, including the primary daimyo residence the San-no-Maru Goten, and most of the castle gates.

The Boshin War, bypassed Karasuyama, which sided with the Imperial cause. The castle was abandoned in 1869, and in 1872 the San-no-maru palace collapsed due to weight of heavy snow. In 1873, a fire swept through the remaining structures. The site is now a park, with some remaining stone walls and earthen ramparts.

Following the establishment of the Meiji government, the remaining castle structures were destroyed in 1871. At present, the site of the castle is a public park.

== Literature ==
- Schmorleitz, Morton S. (1974). Castles in Japan. Tokyo: Charles E. Tuttle Co. pp. 144–145. ISBN 0-8048-1102-4.
- Motoo, Hinago (1986). Japanese Castles. Tokyo: Kodansha. p. 200 pages. ISBN 0-87011-766-1.
- Mitchelhill, Jennifer (2004). Castles of the Samurai: Power and Beauty. Tokyo: Kodansha. p. 112 pages. ISBN 4-7700-2954-3.
- Turnbull, Stephen (2003). Japanese Castles 1540-1640. Osprey Publishing. p. 64 pages. ISBN 1-84176-429-9.
