= Yaita =

Yaita 矢板市
- City
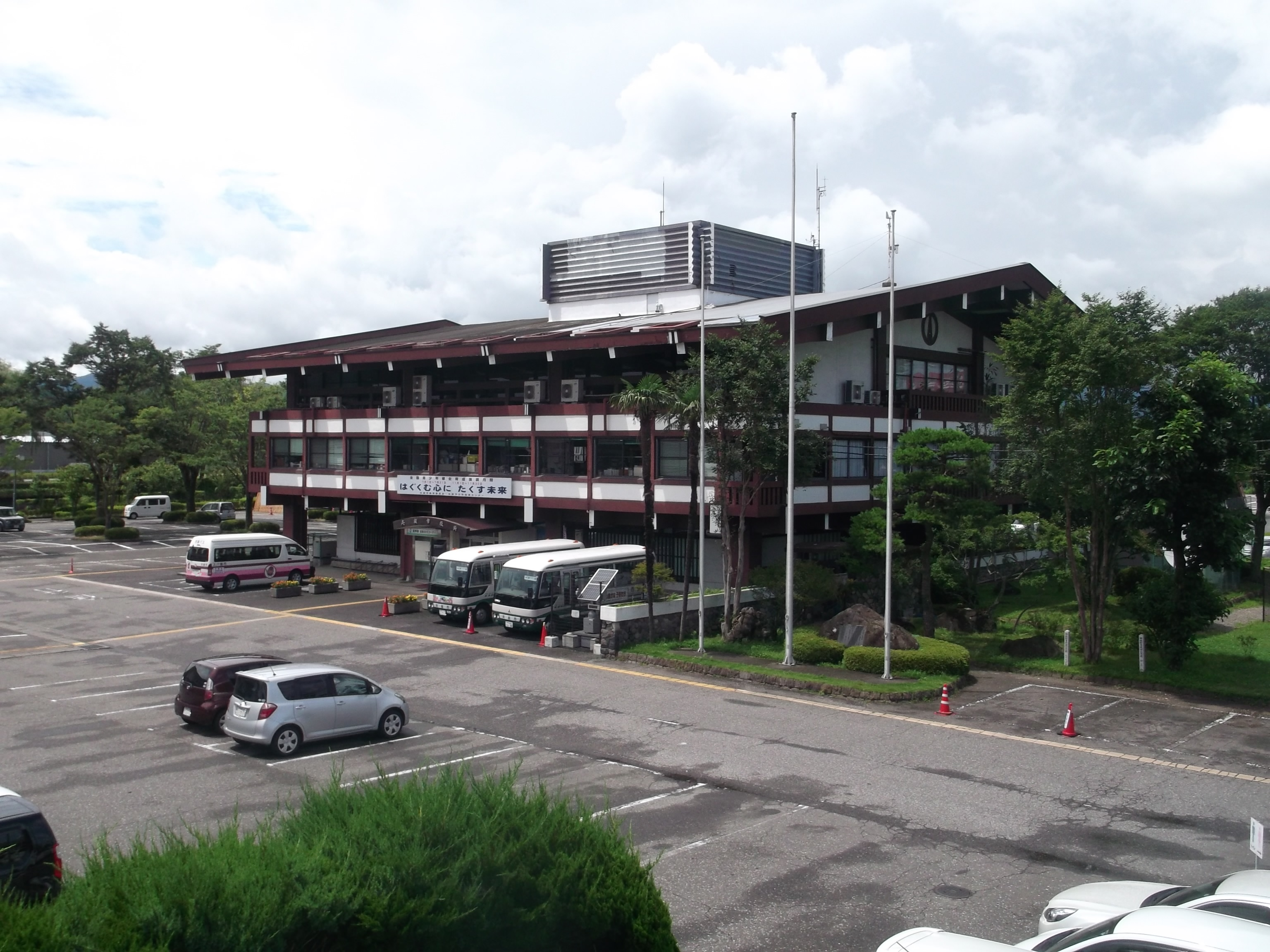
- Yaita City Hall

- Flag Seal

- Location of Yaita in Tochigi Prefecture

- Coordinates: 36°48′24.2″N 139°55′26.8″E
- Country: Japan
- Region: Kantō
- Prefecture: Tochigi Prefecture

Government
  - Mayor: Jyunichiro Saito <齋藤淳一郎> (from April 2016)

Area
  - Total: 170.46 km^{2} (65.81 sq mi)

Population (July 1, 2020)
  - Total: 31,859
  - Density: 186.90/km^{2} (484.07/sq mi)
- Time zone: UTC+9 (Japan Standard Time)
- Tree: Japanese stuartia
- Flower: Japanese azalea
- Bird: Oriental turtle dove
- Phone number: 0287-43-1111
- Address: 5-4 Honcho, Yaita-shi, Tochigi-ken 329-2192
- Website: Official website

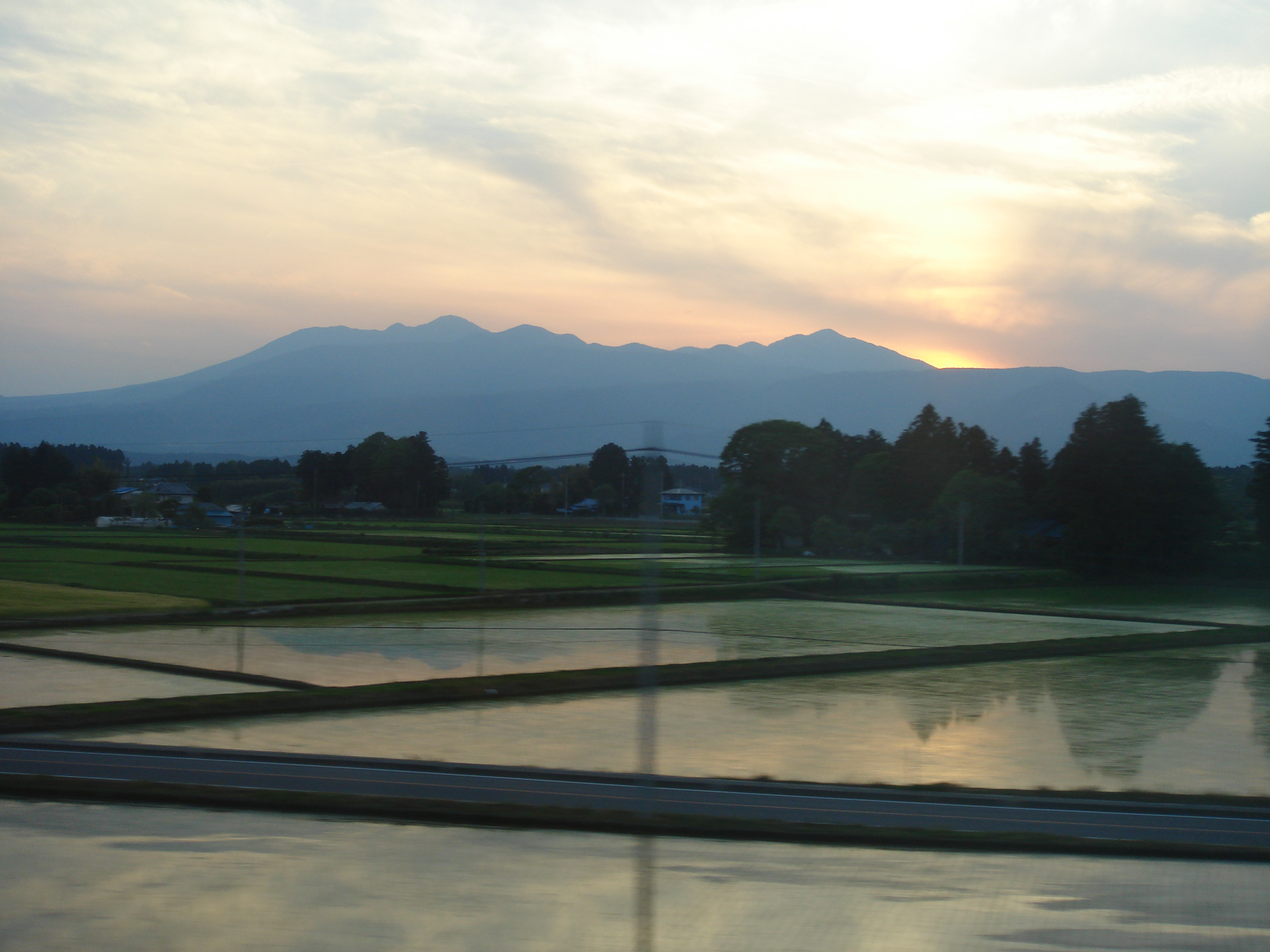
Mount Takahara

Yaita (矢板市, Yaita-shi) is a city located in Tochigi Prefecture, Japan. As of 1 July 2020, the city had an estimated population of 31,859 in 13,173 households, and a population density of 67 persons per km^{2}. The total area of the town is 170.46 square kilometres (65.81 sq mi).

== Geography ==
Yaita is located in north-central Tochigi Prefecture in the foothills of the Nasu region. The area is well watered, with numerous springs and rivers. The city spreads to the southern foot of Mount Takahara. The northern mountains and forest areas include the Tochigi Prefectural Forest, Happo Natural Recreation Forest, and are an important watershed and source of spring water. The southern part of the city is composed of a plain that is the northernmost extension of the Kanto plain. The urban center is about 130 kilometers north of the Tokyo metropolis and 30 kilometers north of the prefectural capital at Utsunomiya.

== Surrounding municipalities ==
Tochigi Prefecture

- Nasushiobara
- Ōtawara
- Sakura
- Shioya

== Climate ==
Yaita has a humid subtropical climate (Köppen Cfa) characterized by warm summers and cold winters with heavy snowfall. The average annual temperature in Yaita is 12.2 °C. The average annual rainfall is 1482 mm with September as the wettest month. The temperatures are highest on average in August, at around 24.6 °C, and lowest in January, at around 0.6 °C.

== Demographics ==
Per Japanese census data, the population of Yaita has remained relatively steady over the past 70 years.

Historical population
Year	Pop.	±%
1950	31,033	—
1960	29,085	−6.3%
1970	30,063	+3.4%
1980	32,747	+8.9%
1990	35,603	+8.7%
2000	36,466	+2.4%
2010	35,358	−3.0%
2020	31,165	−11.9%

== History ==
The area of Yaita has been settled since Japanese Paleolithic times, and the workings of an obsidian mine in the northern portion of the city has been dated to 19,000 years ago. During the Edo Period, most of the area was the direct tenryō holdings of the Tokugawa Shogunate. With the creation of the modern municipalities system on April 1, 1889, the villages of Yaita, Izumi and Kataoka villages were established within Shioya District, Tochigi Prefecture. Yaita was elevated to town status on June 25, 1895. Yaita annexed Izumi and Kataoka on January 1, 1955. It was elevated to city status on November 1, 1958.

== Government ==
Yaita has a mayor-council form of government with a directly elected mayor and a unicameral town council of 16 members. Yaita contributes one member to the Tochigi Prefectural Assembly. In terms of national politics, the city is part of Tochigi 2nd district of the lower house of the Diet of Japan.

== Economy ==
Agriculture (primarily rice) and forestry are mainstays of the local economy. The consumer electronics company Sharp has a large factory in Yaita.

== Education ==
Yaita has nine public primary schools, and three public middle schools operated by the city government, and three public high schools operated by the Tochigi Prefectural Board of Education. The International University of Health and Welfare College of Nursing is located in Yaita.

== Transportation ==
=== Railway ===
JR East – Tōhoku Main Line (Utsunomiya Line)

- Kataoka – Yaita

=== Highway ===
- Tōhoku Expressway – Yaita Interchange – Yaita-kita Parking Area and Smart Interchange
- National Route 4
- National Route 461

== Local attractions ==
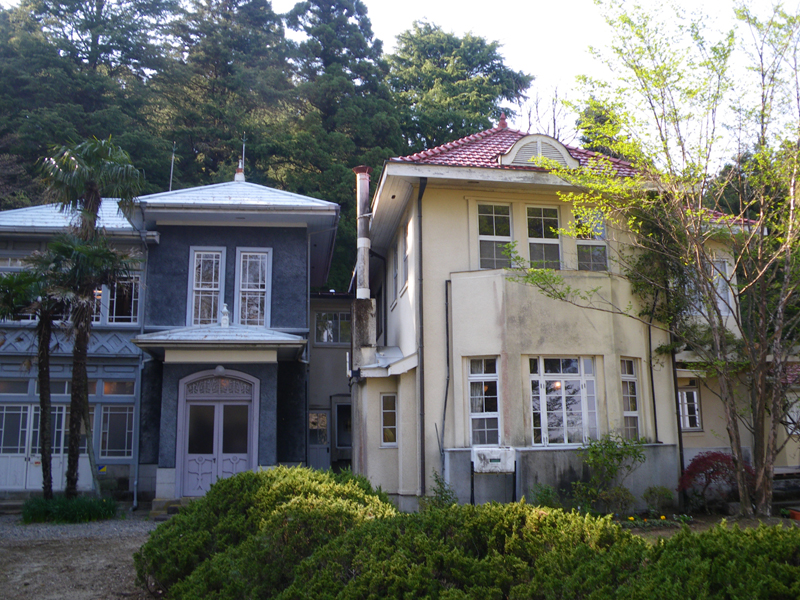
Yamagata Aritomo memorial house

- Yaita onsen
- Yamagata Aritomo Memorial House
