= Nishinasuno, Tochigi =

Dissolved municipality in Tochigi prefecture, Japan

Nishinasuno (西那須野町, Nishinasuno-machi) was a town located in Nasu District, Tochigi Prefecture, Japan.

== History ==
As of 2003, the town had an estimated population of 45,251 and a density of 758.86 persons per km^{2}. The total area was 59.63 km^{2}.

On January 1, 2005, Nishinasuno, along with the city of Kuroiso, and the town of Shiobara (also from Nasu District), was merged to create the city of Nasushiobara.

== Geography ==
It is located near Mount Nasu. Some of the tourist attractions close to it are hot springs, Karasuka Mori park, and Nasu Nagahara park.
