= Nasu District =

District in Tochigi prefecture, Japan

Coordinates: 37.032°N 140.125°E

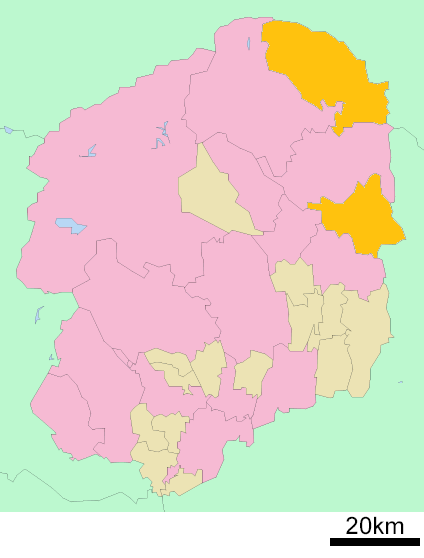
A map of discontiguous Nasu District. The town of Nasu is to the north, Nakagawa to the south.

Nasu (那須郡, Nasu-gun) is a district located in Tochigi Prefecture, Japan. The district consists of the two discontiguous towns of Nasu and Nakagawa, separated by the city of Ōtawara in the middle.

The total area of the district was 1,209.59 km^{2} before the former constituent towns of Nishinasuno, and Shiobara were consolidated with Kuroiso to form the new city of Nasushiobara on January 1, 2005. In 2003, the district had an estimated population of 154,881 and a density of 128.04 persons per km^{2}.

== Mergers ==
- On January 1, 2005 the towns of Nishinasuno and Shiobara merged with the city of Kuroiso to form the new city of Nasushiobara.
- On October 1, 2005 the towns of Batō and Ogawa merged to form the new town of Nakagawa.
- On October 1, 2005 the towns of Karasuyama and Minaminasu merged to form the new city of Nasukarasuyama.
- On October 1, 2005 the town of Kurobane, and the village of Yuzukami merged into the city of Ōtawara.
