= Kurobane, Tochigi =

Dissolved municipality in Tochigi prefecture, Japan

Coordinates: 36°51′N 140°07′E

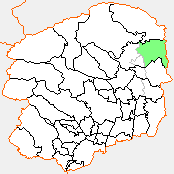
Map of Kurobane, Tochigi

Kurobane (黒羽町, Kurobane-machi) was a town located in Nasu District, Tochigi Prefecture, Japan.

During the Edo period Kurobane developed as the castle town for Kurobane Domain, an 18,000 koku feudal domain under the Tokugawa shogunate.

As of 2003 the town had an estimated population of 16,499 and a density of 87.93 persons per km^{2}. The total area was 187.64 km^{2}.

On October 1, 2005, Kurobane, along with the village of Yuzukami (also from Nasu District), was merged into the expanded city of Ōtawara.
