= Minaminasu, Tochigi =

Dissolved municipality in Tochigi prefecture, Japan

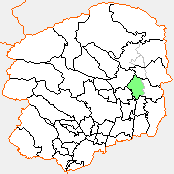
Map of Minaminasu, Tochigi

Minaminasu (南那須町, Minaminasu-machi) was a town located in Nasu District, Tochigi Prefecture, Japan.

As of 2003, the town had an estimated population of 13,128 and a density of 160.96 persons per km^{2}. The total area was 81.56 km^{2}.

On October 1, 2005, Minaminasu, along with the town of Karasuyama (also from Nasu District), was merged to create the city of Nasukarasuyama and no longer exists as an independent municipality.
