= Shiobara, Tochigi =

Dissolved municipality in Tochigi prefecture, Japan

Shiobara (塩原町, Shiobara-machi) was a town located in Nasu District, Tochigi Prefecture, Japan.

As of 2003, the town had an estimated population of 8,694 and a density of 45.74 persons per km^{2}. The total area was 190.07 km^{2}.

On January 1, 2005, Shiobara, along with city of Kuroiso, and the town of Nishinasuno (also from Nasu District), was merged to create the city of Nasushiobara.
