= Karasuyama, Tochigi =

Town located in Nasu District, Tochigi Prefecture, Japan

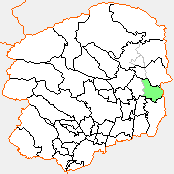
Map of Karasuyama, Tochigi

Karasuyama (烏山町, Karasuyama-machi) was a town located in Nasu District, Tochigi Prefecture, Japan.

As of 2003, the town had an estimated population of 18,799 and a density of 202.44 persons per km^{2}. The total area was 92.86 km^{2}.

On October 1, 2005, Karasuyama, along with the town of Minaminasu (also from Nasu District), was merged to create the city of Nasukarasuyama and no longer exists as an independent municipality.
