= Kitsuregawa, Tochigi =

Dissolved municipality in Shioya district, Tochigi prefecture, Japan

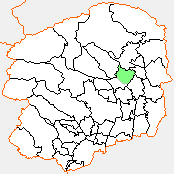
Map of Kitsuregawa, Tochigi

Kitsuregawa (喜連川町, Kitsuregawa-machi) was a town located in Shioya District, Tochigi, Japan.

As of 2003, the town had an estimated population of 11,143 and a density of 147.65 persons per km^{2}. The total area was 75.47 km^{2}.

On March 28, 2005, Kitsuregawa, along with the town of Ujiie (also from Shioya District), was merged to create the city of Sakura.
