= Kuroiso, Tochigi =

Dissolved municipality in Tochigi prefecture, Japan

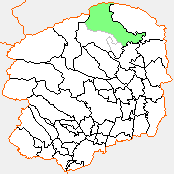
Location of Kuroiso (green) in Tochigi Prefecture.

Kuroiso (黒磯市, Kuroiso-shi), formerly a city in Tochigi Prefecture, Japan, is a district located in the modern city of Nasushiobara. The former city was founded on November 1, 1970.

In 2003, the city had an estimated population of 60,145 and a density of 175.29 persons per km^{2}. The total area was 343.12 km^{2}.

== History ==
On January 1, 2005, Kuroiso was merged with the towns of Nishinasuno and Shiobara (both from Nasu District) to create the city of Nasushiobara.

== Geography ==
Kuroiso is located at the northernmost tip of Tochigi, bordering Fukushima Prefecture. Kuroiso Station serves as the terminal station for two subsections of the JR East Tōhoku Main Line railway, making it a junction between the Kantō and Tōhoku regions of Japan. The station's bus terminal also makes Kuroiso a gateway to the neighboring town of Nasu, known in Japan for its mountain hot springs and as the location of the Nasu Imperial Villa.

== Main sights ==
Kuroiso is popular in Northern Tochigi for its local cafes and restaurants, as well as for having northern Tochigi's only multiplex movie theater.

A Bridgestone steel cord plant is also located in the district.
