= Sakura, Tochigi =

Sakura さくら市
- City
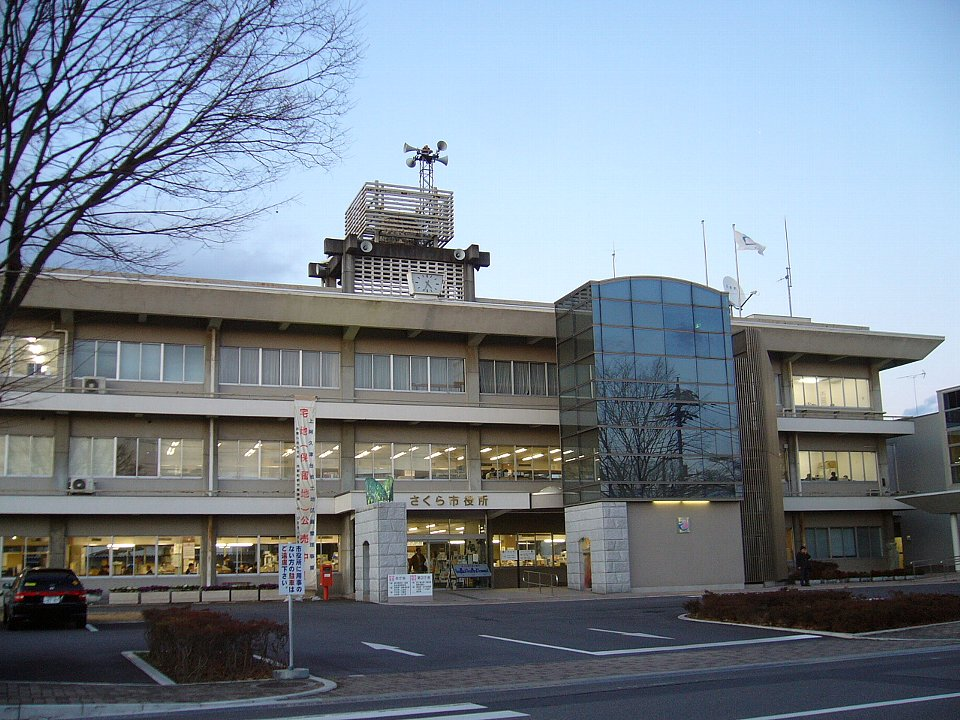
- Sakura City Hall

- Flag Seal

- Location of Sakura in Tochigi Prefecture

- Coordinates: 36°41′7″N 139°57′59.1″E
- Country: Japan
- Region: Kantō
- Prefecture: Tochigi

Area
  - Total: 125.63 km^{2} (48.51 sq mi)

Population (April 1, 2021)
  - Total: 44,712
  - Density: 355.90/km^{2} (921.78/sq mi)
- Time zone: UTC+9 (Japan Standard Time)
- Tree: Sakura
- Flower: Sakura
- Bird: Wagtail
- Phone number: 028-681-1111
- Address: 2771 Ujiie, Sakura-shi, Tochigi-ken 329-1311
- Website: Official website

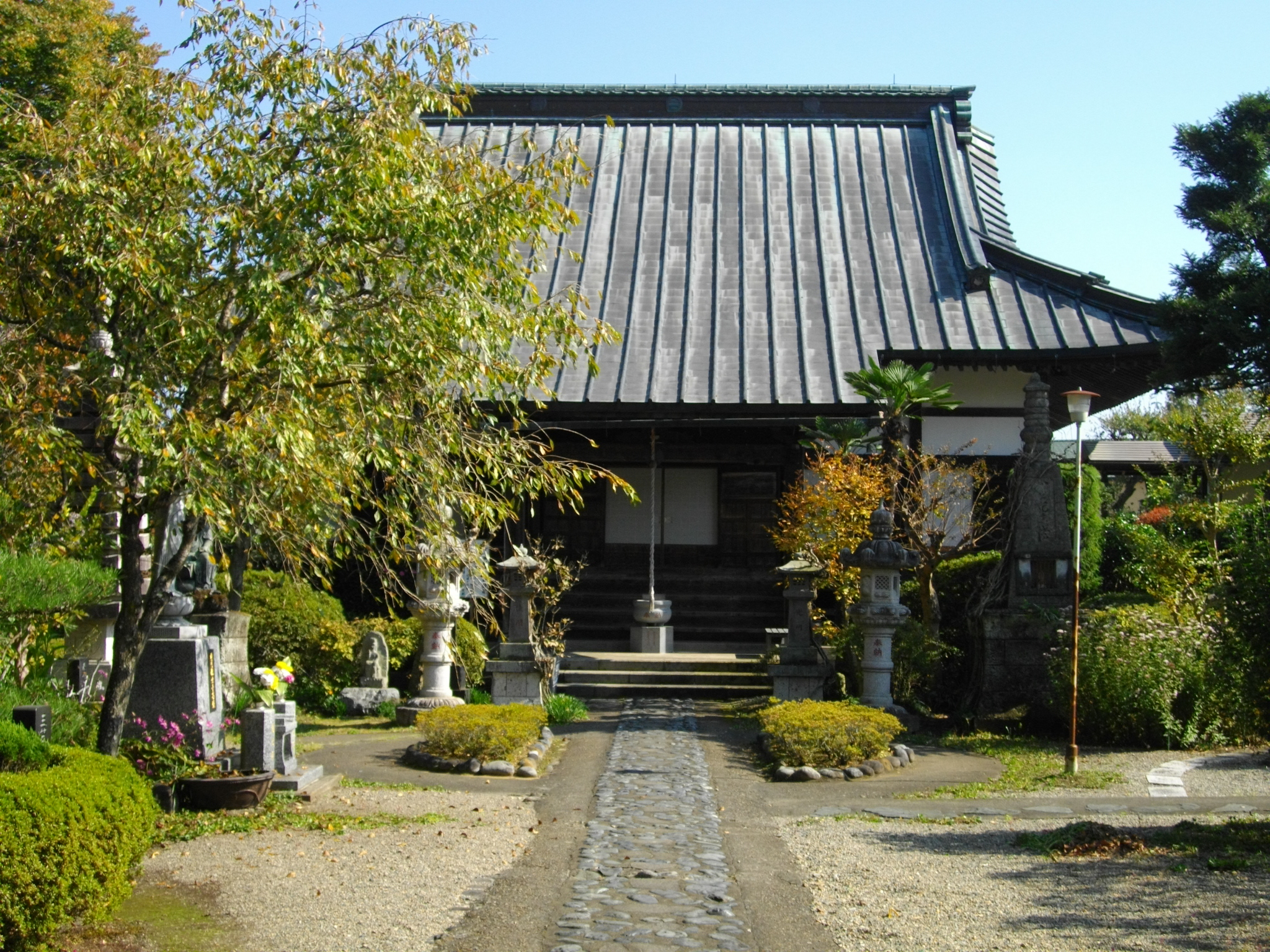
Ryuko-ji temple

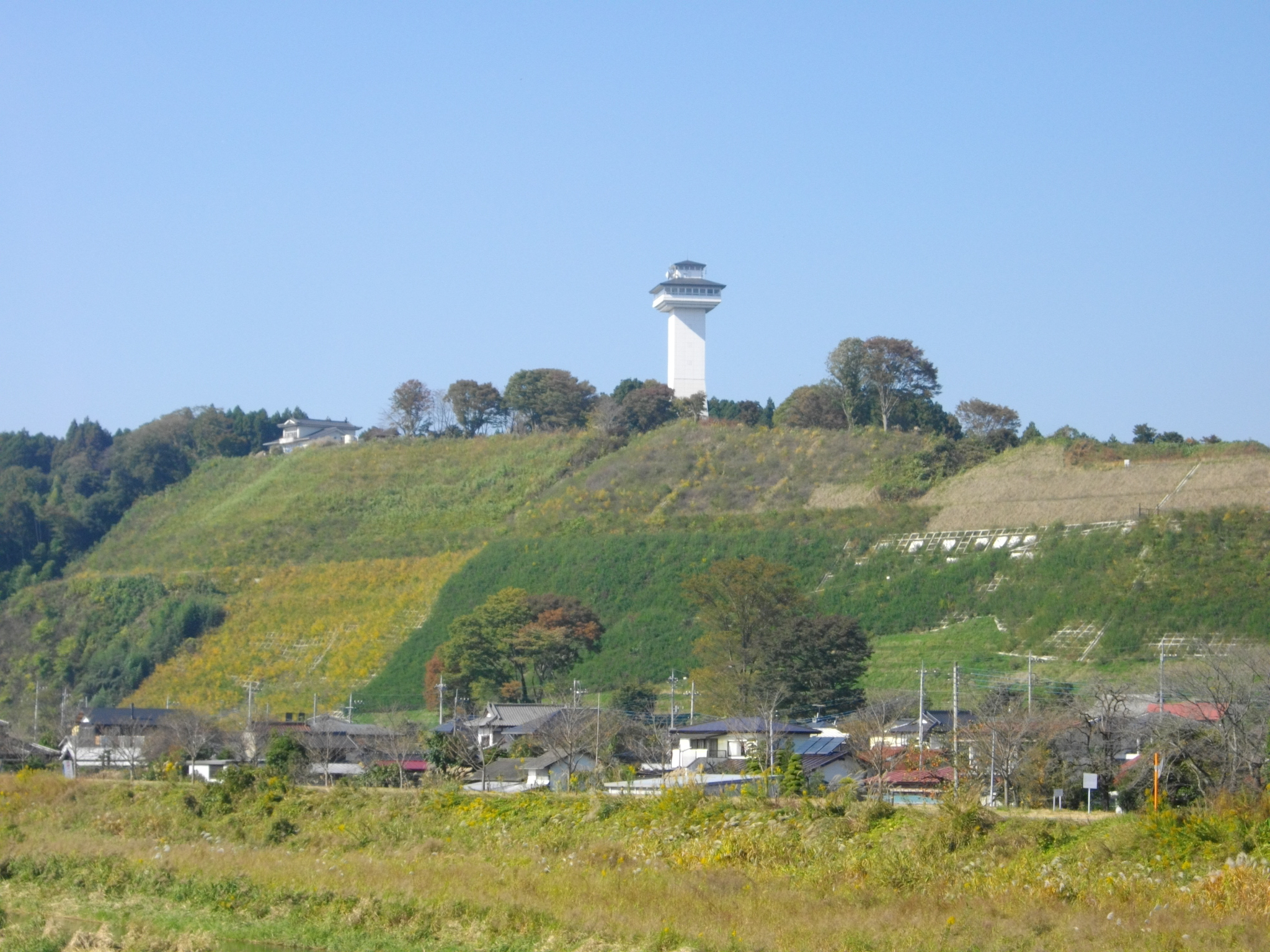
Ruins of Kitsuregawa Castle

Sakura (さくら市, Sakura-shi; Japanese pronunciation: [sä́.kɯ̈̀.ɾä̀, sä̀.kɯ̈́.ɾä́(.ɕì)] (Note: The placename and personal name Sakura is pronounced with an accent, unlike the common noun sakura (桜; [sä̀.kɯ̈́.ɾä́]) from which it derives.)) is a city located in Tochigi Prefecture, Japan. As of 1 April 2021, the city had an estimated population of 44,712 in 16,882 households, and a population density of 360 persons per km^{2}. The total area of the city is 125.63 square kilometres (48.51 sq mi).

== Geography ==
Sakura is located in central-east Tochigi Prefecture, at the far-northern portion of the Kantō plains. the city is approximately 115 kilometers north of the Tokyo metropolis and 15 kilometers north of the prefectural capital of Utsunomiya. It consists mostly of flat land extending to the east of the Kinugawa River, and hilly land to the east of several tributaries of the Naka River.

== Surrounding municipalities ==
Tochigi Prefecture

- Nakagawa
- Nasukarasuyama
- Ōtawara
- Shioya
- Takanezawa
- Utsunomiya
- Yaita

== Climate ==
Sakura has a humid subtropical climate (Köppen Cfa) characterized by warm summers and cold winters with heavy snowfall. The average annual temperature in Sakura is 13.1 °C. The average annual rainfall is 1425 mm with September as the wettest month. The temperatures are highest on average in August, at around 24.9 °C, and lowest in January, at around 1.6 °C.

== Demographics ==
Per Japanese census data, the population of Sakura has recently plateaued after a long period of growth.

Historical population
Year	Pop.	±%
1960	33,375	—
1970	32,495	−2.6%
1980	34,820	+7.2%
1990	36,543	+4.9%
2000	40,030	+9.5%
2010	44,774	+11.9%
2020	44,513	−0.6%

== History ==
The town of Kitsuregawa was established on April 1, 1889, with the creation of the modern municipalities system. The city of Sakura was established on March 28, 2005, with the merger of the towns of Kitsuregawa and Ujiie (both from Shioya District).

== Government ==
Sakura has a mayor-council form of government with a directly elected mayor and a unicameral city assembly of 18 members. Sakura, together with the towns of Shioya and Takanezawa collectively contributes two members to the Tochigi Prefectural Assembly. In terms of national politics, the town is part of Tochigi 2nd district of the lower house of the Diet of Japan.

== Economy ==
Agriculture, primarily rice cultivation, is a mainstay of the local economy. The city is increasingly a bedroom community for nearby Utsunomiya.

== Education ==
Sakura has six public primary schools, two public middle schools operated by the city government. The city has one public high school operated by the Tochigi Prefectural Board of Education.

== Transportation ==
=== Railway ===
JR East – Tōhoku Main Line (Utsunomiya Line)

- Ujiie - Kamasusaka

=== Highway ===
- National Route 4
- National Route 293

== Local attractions ==
- Kitsuregawa Castle and the Sakura City Museum of Art are located in Sakura.
