= Nasukarasuyama =

Nasukarasuyama 那須烏山市
- City
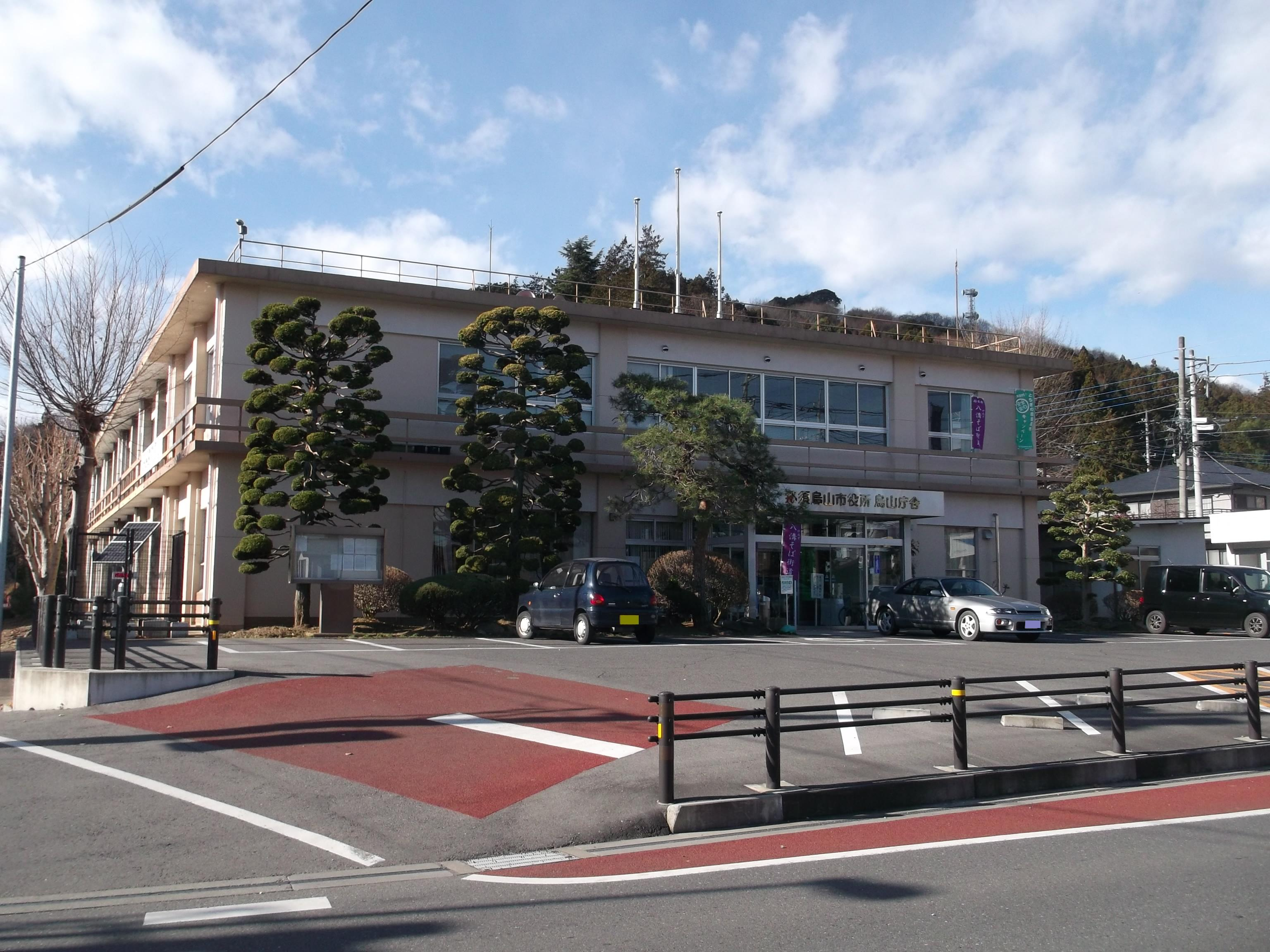
- Nasukarasuyama City Hall

- Flag Seal

- Location of Nasukarasuyama in Tochigi Prefecture

- Coordinates: 36°39′24.8″N 140°9′5.1″E
- Country: Japan
- Region: Kantō
- Prefecture: Tochigi

Area
  - Total: 174.35 km^{2} (67.32 sq mi)

Population (August 1, 2020)
  - Total: 25,783
  - Density: 147.88/km^{2} (383.01/sq mi)
- Time zone: UTC+9 (Japan Standard Time)
- Phone number: 0287-83-1111
- Address: 1-1-1 Chuo, Nasukarasuyama-shi, Tochigi-ken 321-0692
- Climate: Cfa
- Website: Official website
- Symbols
- Bird: Crow
- Flower: Magnolia kobus
- Tree: Zelkova serrata

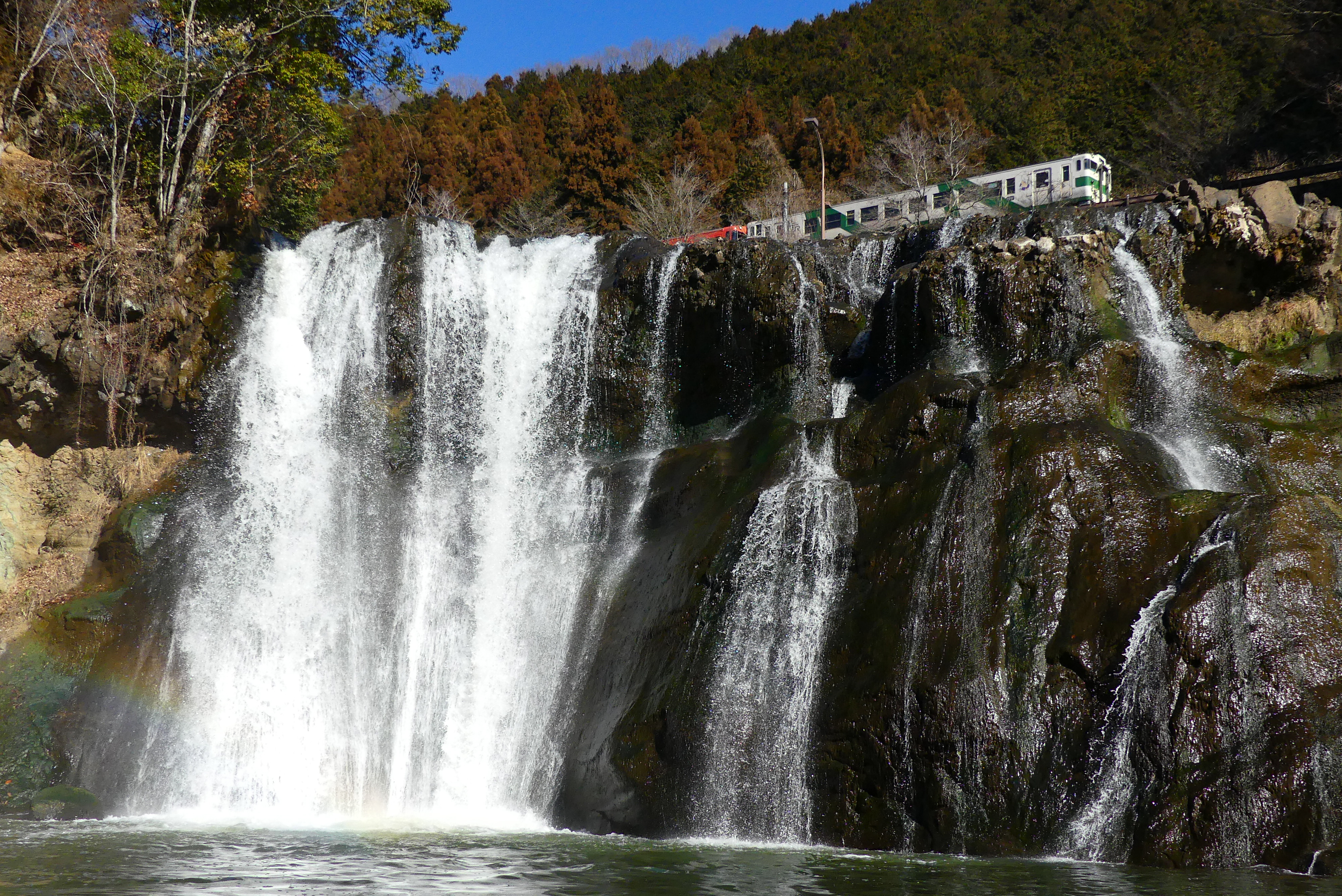
Ryumon Falls

Nasukarasuyama (那須烏山市, Nasukarasuyama-shi) is a city located in Tochigi Prefecture, Japan. As of 1 August 2020, the city had an estimated population of 25,783 in 10,509 households, and a population density of 150 persons per km^{2}. The total area of the city is 174.35 square kilometres (67.32 sq mi).

== Geography ==
Nasukarasuyama is located in the center-eastern part of Tochigi Prefecture, at the western foot of the Yamizo Mountains, at the southern end of the Shiona Hills, and in the middle reaches of the Naka River. The old Karasuyama town area is located on the right bank of the Naka River. The city is 30–35 km northeast from the prefectural capital of Utsunomiya. Nasukarasuyama is the political, economic, and administrative base for the eastern part of the prefecture.

=== Surrounding municipalities ===
- Ibaraki Prefecture
  - Hitachiōmiya
- Tochigi Prefecture
  - Ichikai
  - Nakagawa
  - Sakura
  - Takanezawa

=== Demographics ===
Per Japanese census data, the population of Nasukarasuyama has declined over the past 30 years.

Historical population
Year	Pop.	±%
1960	39,046	—
1970	33,539	−14.1%
1980	33,562	+0.1%
1990	33,699	+0.4%
2000	32,790	−2.7%
2010	29,177	−11.0%
2020	24,875	−14.7%

== Climate ==
Nasukarasuyama has a humid subtropical climate (Köppen Cfa) characterized by warm summers and cold winters with heavy snowfall. The average annual temperature in Nasukarasuyama is 13.2 °C (55.8 °F). The average annual rainfall is 1,436.3 mm (56.55 in) with September as the wettest month. The temperatures are highest on average in August, at around 29 °C (84 °F), and lowest in January, at around 0.9 °C (33.6 °F).

Climate data for Nasukarasuyama (elevation 82 m, 2009–2020 normals, extremes 2009–present)
Month	Jan	Feb	Mar	Apr	May	Jun	Jul	Aug	Sep	Oct	Nov	Dec	Year
Record high °C (°F)	17.2 (63.0)	21.7 (71.1)	25.5 (77.9)	30.3 (86.5)	33.1 (91.6)	36.3 (97.3)	37.3 (99.1)	37.6 (99.7)	36.0 (96.8)	32.3 (90.1)	24.8 (76.6)	20.3 (68.5)	37.6 (99.7)
Mean daily maximum °C (°F)	8.6 (47.5)	9.4 (48.9)	13.2 (55.8)	18.2 (64.8)	23.7 (74.7)	25.8 (78.4)	29.4 (84.9)	30.9 (87.6)	27.2 (81.0)	21.5 (70.7)	16.0 (60.8)	10.7 (51.3)	19.6 (67.3)
Daily mean °C (°F)	0.9 (33.6)	2.5 (36.5)	6.4 (43.5)	11.3 (52.3)	17.2 (63.0)	20.6 (69.1)	24.4 (75.9)	25.4 (77.7)	21.5 (70.7)	15.6 (60.1)	9.1 (48.4)	3.4 (38.1)	13.2 (55.8)
Mean daily minimum °C (°F)	−5.4 (22.3)	−3.7 (25.3)	−0.1 (31.8)	4.7 (40.5)	11.3 (52.3)	16.4 (61.5)	20.8 (69.4)	21.5 (70.7)	17.5 (63.5)	10.9 (51.6)	3.4 (38.1)	−2.4 (27.7)	7.9 (46.2)
Record low °C (°F)	−12.3 (9.9)	−11.0 (12.2)	−7.6 (18.3)	−5.7 (21.7)	0.6 (33.1)	7.0 (44.6)	12.8 (55.0)	11.7 (53.1)	7.6 (45.7)	0.7 (33.3)	−4.0 (24.8)	−9.0 (15.8)	−12.3 (9.9)
Average precipitation mm (inches)	32.7 (1.29)	47.3 (1.86)	91.3 (3.59)	138.5 (5.45)	128.0 (5.04)	169.3 (6.67)	180.9 (7.12)	154.7 (6.09)	188.8 (7.43)	171.9 (6.77)	69.5 (2.74)	47.7 (1.88)	1,436.3 (56.55)
Average precipitation days (≥ 1.0 mm)	3.5	5.6	8.2	9.8	9.5	12.3	13.2	10.5	11.0	9.3	6.3	4.8	104.8
Mean monthly sunshine hours	220.0	185.4	196.7	192.4	203.4	138.3	135.6	169.0	140.1	144.0	159.8	187.2	2,086.8
Source: Japan Meteorological Agency (2009–2020 normals, extremes 2009–present)

== History ==
The area began as a castle town for Karasuyama Domain in the Edo period, centered on Karasuyama Castle, a fortification dating to the Kamakura period. Karasuyama Town was established with the creation of the modern municipalities system on April 1, 1889. It merged with the neighboring villages of Mukada, Sakai, and Nanago on March 31, 1954. The modern city of Nasukarasuyama was established on October 1, 2005, from the merger of the towns of Karasuyama and Minaminasu (both from Nasu District).

== Government ==
Nasukarasuyama has a mayor-council form of government with a directly elected mayor and a unicameral city assembly of 17 members. Nasukarasuyama, together with the town of Nakagawa a collectively contributes one member to the Tochigi Prefectural Assembly. In terms of national politics, the town is part of Tochigi 3rd district of the lower house of the Diet of Japan.

== Economy ==
Nasukarasuyama has primarily an agricultural economy, with a secondary emphasis on tourism.

== Education ==
- Nasukarasuyama has five public primary schools and two public middle schools operated by the city government, and one public high school operated by the Tochigi Prefectural Board of Education.

== Notable people ==
- Junko Kawamata (born 1960), politician

== Transportation ==
=== Railway ===
JR East – Karasuyama Line

- Kōnoyama - Ōgane - Kobana - Taki - Karasuyama

=== Highway ===
- National Route 293
- National Route 294

== Local attractions ==
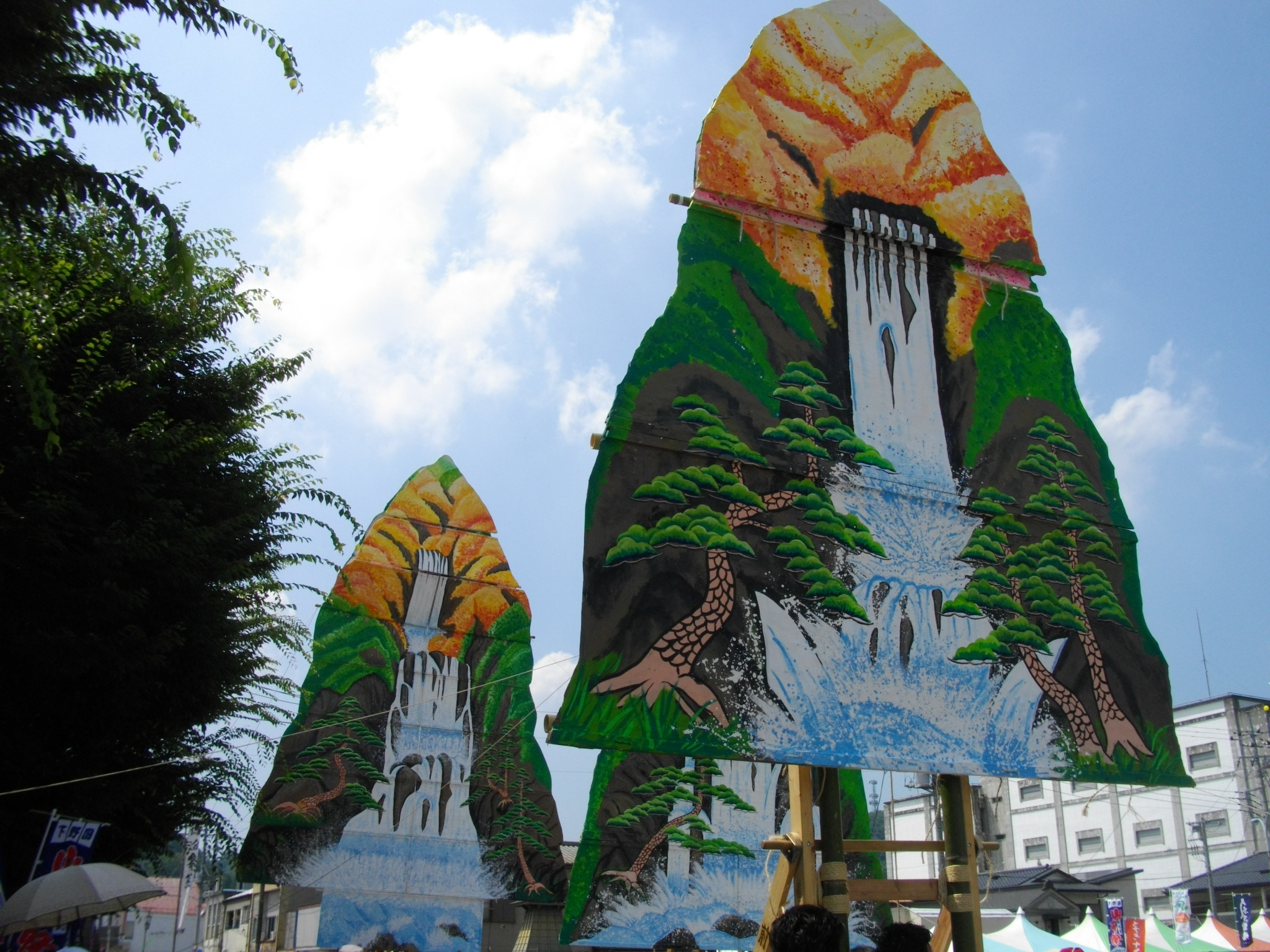
Yamaage Matsuri

- Karasuyama Castle
- Yamaage Kaikan

== Sister cities ==
- Menomonie, Wisconsin, United States
