= Shioya District =

District in Tochigi prefecture, Japan

Coordinates: 36.777°N 139.828°E

Shioya (塩谷郡, Shioya-gun) is a district in Tochigi Prefecture, Japan.

As of 2003, the district has an estimated population of 57,656 and a density of 60.91 persons per square kilometer. Its total area is 946.53 km^{2}.

== Towns and villages ==
- Shioya
- Takanezawa

== History ==
- Named after an old, powerful family that owned most of the area in the district for hundreds of years.

== Merger ==
- On March 28, 2005 the towns of Kitsuregawa and Ujiie merged to form the city of Sakura.
- On March 20, 2006 the town of Fujihara and the village of Kuriyama merged into the city of Nikkō. With this merger, there are no more villages left within Tochigi Prefecture.
