= Yuzukami, Tochigi =

Dissolved municipality in Tochigi prefecture, Japan

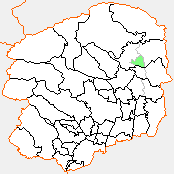
Map of Yuzukami, Tochigi

Yuzukami (湯津上村, Yuzukami-mura) was a village located in Nasu District, Tochigi Prefecture, Japan.

As of 2003, the village had an estimated population of 5,225 and a density of 159.88 persons per km^{2}. The total area was 32.68 km^{2}.

On October 1, 2005, Yuzukami, along with the town of Kurobane (also from Nasu District), was merged into the expanded city of Ōtawara.
