= Shioya, Tochigi =

Shioya 塩谷町
- Town
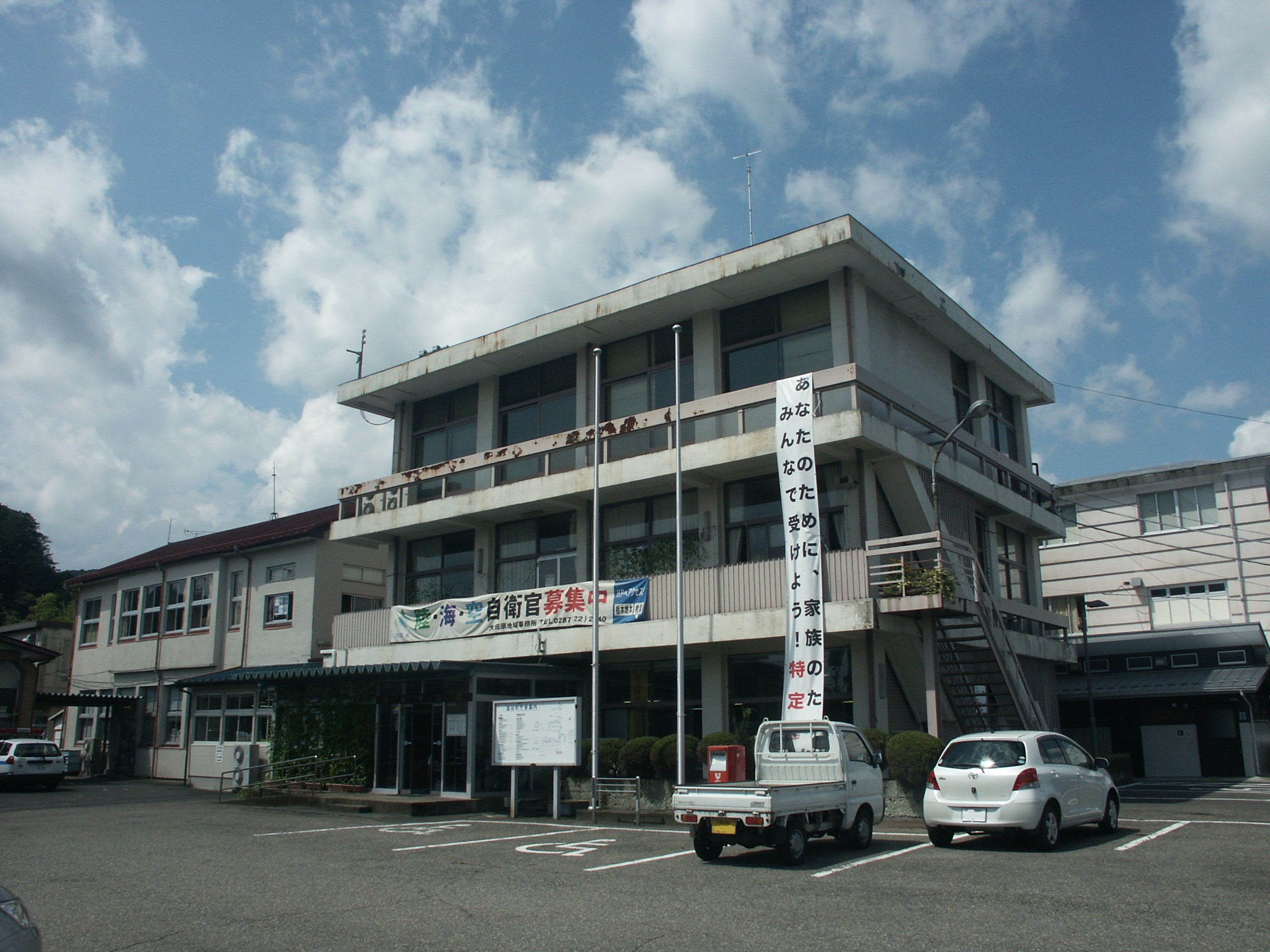
- Shioya Town Hall

- Flag Seal

- Location of Shioya in Tochigi Prefecture

- Coordinates: 36°46′39.3″N 139°51′2″E
- Country: Japan
- Region: Kantō
- Prefecture: Tochigi Prefecture
- District: Shioya

Area
  - Total: 176.06 km^{2} (67.98 sq mi)

Population (August 2020)
  - Total: 10,906
  - Density: 61.945/km^{2} (160.44/sq mi)
- Time zone: UTC+9 (Japan Standard Time)
- Phone number: 028-675-8100
- Address: Tamanyu 741, Shioya-machi, Shioya-gun, Tochigi-ken 329-2292
- Climate: Cfa
- Website: Official website
- Symbols
- Bird: Crested kingfisher
- Flower: Mountain lily
- Tree: Hinoki

Shioya (塩谷町, Shioya-machi) is a town located in Tochigi Prefecture, Japan. As of 1 August 2020, the town had an estimated population of 10,906 in 4028 households, and a population density of 62 persons per km^{2}. The total area of the town is 176.06 square kilometres (67.98 sq mi).

== Geography ==
Shioya is located in central Tochigi Prefecture.

=== Surrounding municipalities ===
Tochigi Prefecture

- Nasushiobara
- Nikkō
- Sakura
- Utsunomiya
- Yaita

=== Climate ===
Shioya has a humid subtropical climate (Köppen Cfa) characterized by warm summers and cold winters with heavy snowfall. The average annual temperature in Shioya is 12.6 °C (54.7 °F). The average annual rainfall is 1,670.9 mm (65.78 in) with July as the wettest month. The temperatures are highest on average in August, at around 24.3 °C (75.7 °F), and lowest in January, at around 1.1 °C (34.0 °F).

Climate data for Shioya (1991−2020 normals, extremes 1978−present)
Month	Jan	Feb	Mar	Apr	May	Jun	Jul	Aug	Sep	Oct	Nov	Dec	Year
Record high °C (°F)	16.8 (62.2)	21.1 (70.0)	24.5 (76.1)	29.5 (85.1)	33.5 (92.3)	35.0 (95.0)	35.9 (96.6)	36.6 (97.9)	34.8 (94.6)	31.1 (88.0)	23.8 (74.8)	22.8 (73.0)	36.6 (97.9)
Mean daily maximum °C (°F)	7.2 (45.0)	8.2 (46.8)	11.9 (53.4)	17.5 (63.5)	22.2 (72.0)	24.8 (76.6)	28.4 (83.1)	29.8 (85.6)	25.9 (78.6)	20.5 (68.9)	15.0 (59.0)	9.7 (49.5)	18.4 (65.2)
Daily mean °C (°F)	1.1 (34.0)	2.0 (35.6)	5.5 (41.9)	10.9 (51.6)	16.3 (61.3)	19.8 (67.6)	23.4 (74.1)	24.3 (75.7)	20.6 (69.1)	14.9 (58.8)	8.6 (47.5)	3.3 (37.9)	12.6 (54.6)
Mean daily minimum °C (°F)	−4.4 (24.1)	−3.7 (25.3)	−0.6 (30.9)	4.7 (40.5)	10.8 (51.4)	15.6 (60.1)	19.7 (67.5)	20.5 (68.9)	16.5 (61.7)	9.9 (49.8)	2.9 (37.2)	−2.1 (28.2)	7.5 (45.5)
Record low °C (°F)	−12.6 (9.3)	−13.1 (8.4)	−12.0 (10.4)	−5.0 (23.0)	0.8 (33.4)	6.8 (44.2)	10.0 (50.0)	11.9 (53.4)	5.9 (42.6)	−1.1 (30.0)	−6.4 (20.5)	−9.8 (14.4)	−13.1 (8.4)
Average precipitation mm (inches)	40.2 (1.58)	38.5 (1.52)	94.0 (3.70)	119.7 (4.71)	146.5 (5.77)	193.9 (7.63)	250.9 (9.88)	245.0 (9.65)	240.3 (9.46)	181.6 (7.15)	79.2 (3.12)	41.0 (1.61)	1,670.8 (65.78)
Average precipitation days (≥ 1.0 mm)	4.2	5.0	8.6	10.6	11.6	15.0	16.5	14.6	13.5	10.3	6.5	4.7	121.1
Mean monthly sunshine hours	187.7	185.6	191.7	187.8	178.0	119.0	116.9	142.0	117.6	137.3	159.4	178.5	1,904.9
Source: Japan Meteorological Agency

=== Demographics ===
Per Japanese census data, the population of Shioya has declined over the past 70 years.

Historical population
Year	Pop.	±%
1920	14,104	—
1930	14,277	+1.2%
1940	14,798	+3.6%
1950	20,011	+35.2%
1960	17,665	−11.7%
1970	15,155	−14.2%
1980	14,930	−1.5%
1990	14,898	−0.2%
2000	14,171	−4.9%
2010	12,561	−11.4%
2020	10,354	−17.6%

== History ==
The villages of Tamanyu, Funyu, and Omiya were created within Shioya District of Tochigi Prefecture on April 1, 1889, with the creation of the modern municipalities system after the Meiji Restoration. The three villages merged on March 31, 1957, to create the village of Shioya. Shioya was elevated to town status on February 11, 1965.

== Government ==
Shioya has a mayor-council form of government with a directly elected mayor and a unicameral town council of 12 members. Shioya, together with the city of Sakura and town of Takanezawa collectively contributes two members to the Tochigi Prefectural Assembly. In terms of national politics, the town is part of Tochigi 2nd district of the lower house of the Diet of Japan.

== Economy ==
The economy of Shioya is heavily dependent on agriculture, but is increasingly a bedroom community for the nearby cities of Utsunomiya and Nikkō.

== Education ==
Shioya has three public primary schools, one public middle school operated by the town government, and one public high school operated by the Tochigi Prefectural Board of Education.

== Transportation ==
=== Railway ===
- Shioya does not have any passenger train service.

=== Highway ===
- National Route 461

== Local attractions ==
- Shioya Onsen
- Shojinzawa Yusui – one of the 100 famous springs of Japan
