= Bato, Tochigi =

Dissolved municipality in Tochigi prefecture, Japan

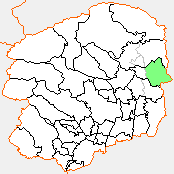
Map of Bato, Tochigi

Batō (馬頭町, Batō-machi) was a town located in Nasu District, Tochigi Prefecture, Japan.

In 2003, the town had an estimated population of 13,195 and a population density of 86.99 per km^{2}. The total area was 151.68 km^{2}.

On October 1, 2005, Batō, along with the town of Ogawa (also from Nasu District), was merged to create the town of Nakagawa.

Starting in 1990, it was the sister city of Horseheads, New York in the United States Of America. Nakagawa later inherited the role. Bato could be translated as "horsehead".
