= Ujiie, Tochigi =

Dissolved municipality in Tochigi prefecture, Japan

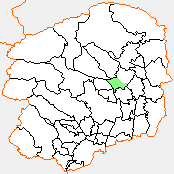
Map of Ujiie, Tochigi

Ujiie (氏家町, Ujiie-machi) was a town located in Shioya District, Tochigi, Japan.

As of 2003, the town had an estimated population of 29,898 and a density of 598.08 persons per km^{2}. The total area was 49.99 km^{2}.

On March 28, 2005, Ujiie, along with the town Kitsuregawa (also from Shioya District), was merged to create the city of Sakura.
