= Ogawa, Tochigi =

Dissolved municipality in Tochigi prefecture, Japan

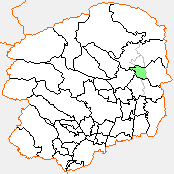
Map of Ogawa, Tochigi

Ogawa (Japanese: 小川町, Ogawa-machi) was a town located in Nasu District, Tochigi Prefecture, Japan.

As of 2003, the town had an estimated population of 6,939 and a density of 168.59 persons per km^{2}. The total area was 41.16 km^{2}.

On October 1, 2005, Ogawa, along with the town of Batō (also from Nasu District), was merged to create the town of Nakagawa.
