= Nasushiobara =

Nasushiobara 那須塩原市
- City
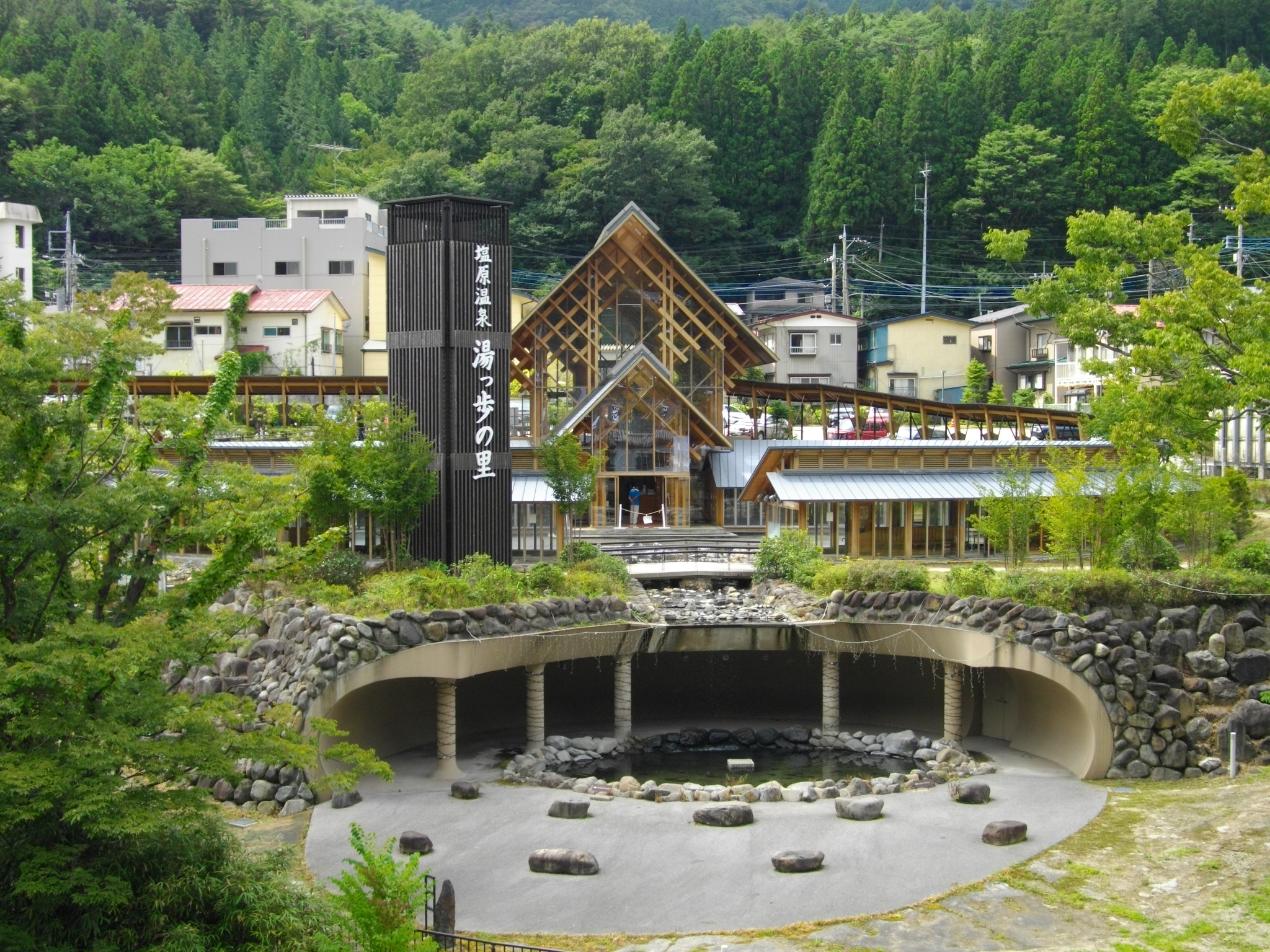
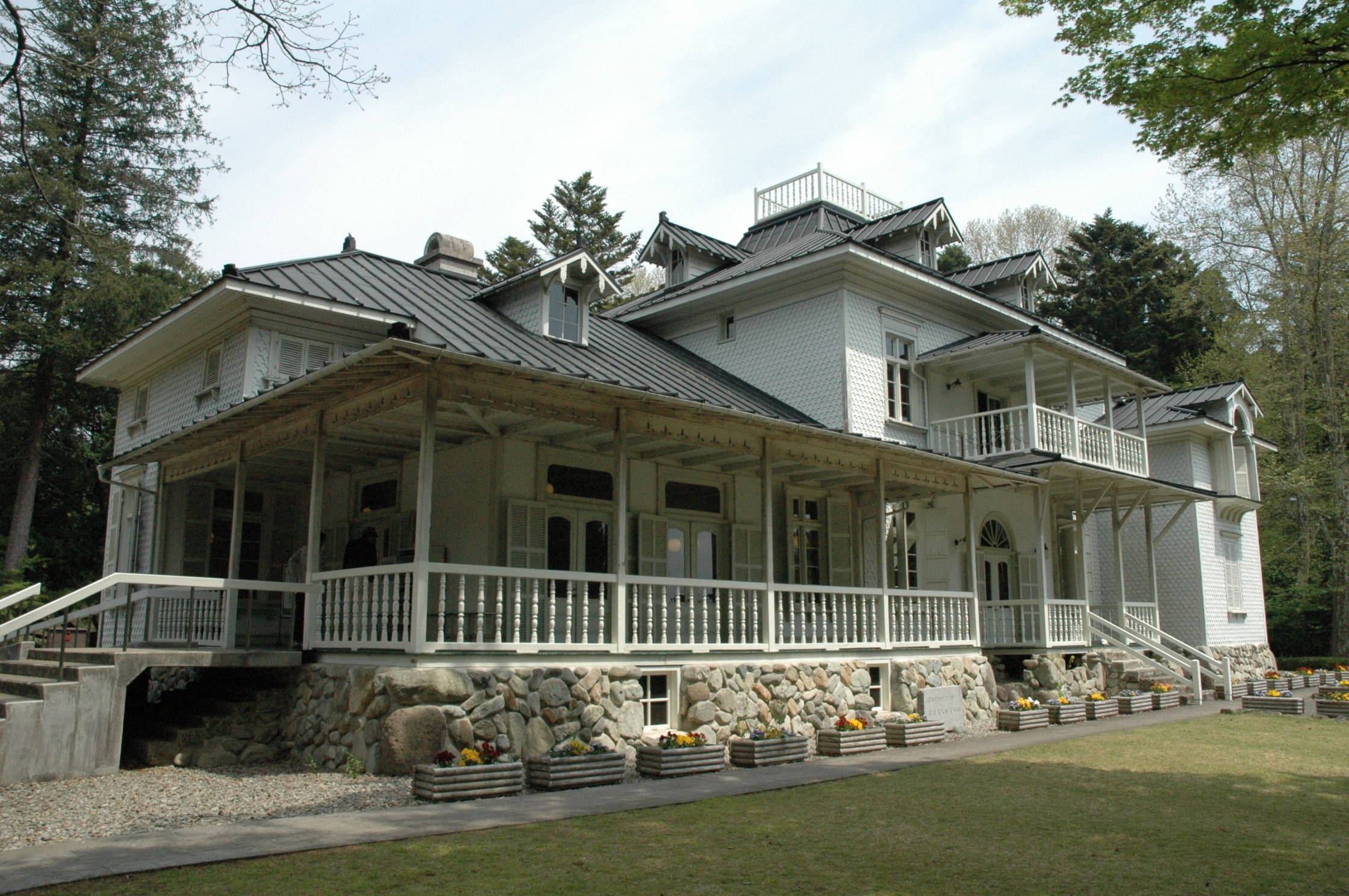
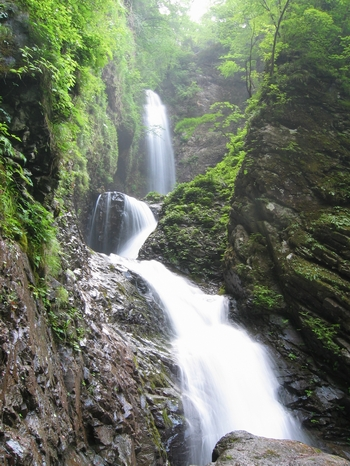
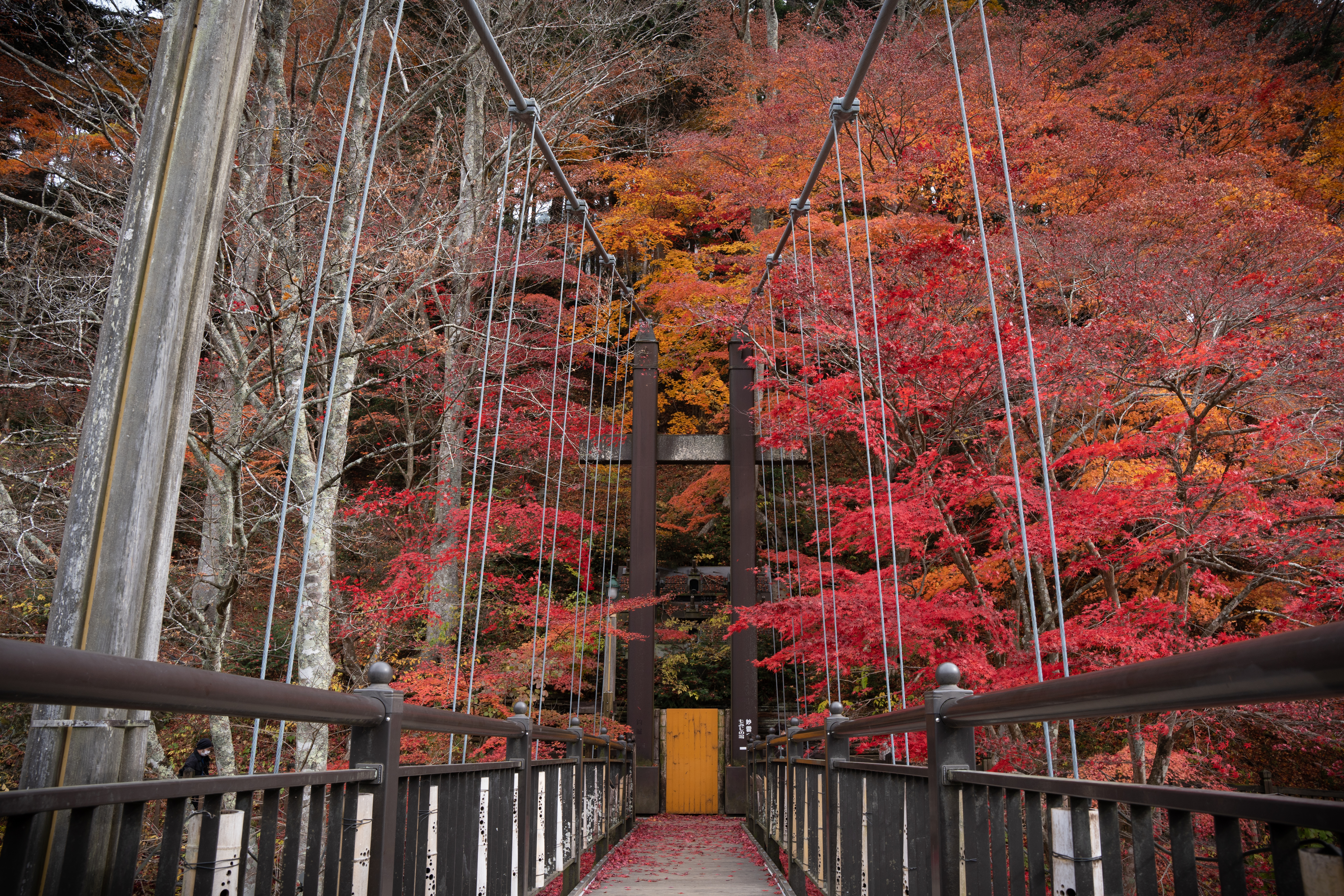
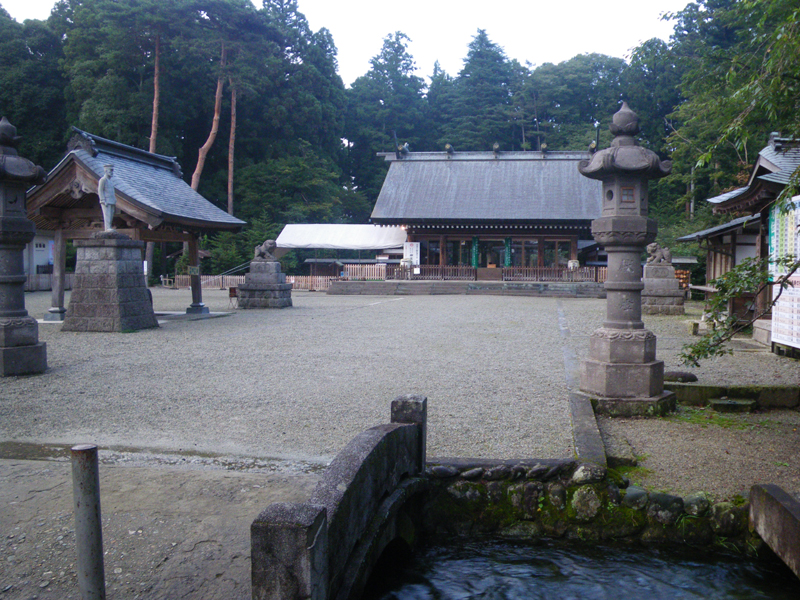
- From top, left to right: Shiobara Onsen, Old Aoki Shuzo's Nasu Villa House, Ryukano falls, Kurenai Bridge, Nogi Shrine

- Flag Seal

- Location of Nasushiobara in Tochigi Prefecture

- Coordinates: 36°57′42.2″N 140°2′45.8″E
- Country: Japan
- Region: Kantō
- Prefecture: Tochigi

Area
  - Total: 592.74 km^{2} (228.86 sq mi)

Population (August 2020)
  - Total: 115,794
  - Density: 195.35/km^{2} (505.96/sq mi)
- Time zone: UTC+9 (Japan Standard Time)
- Phone number: 0287-62-7117
- Address: 108-2, Kyōkonsha, Nasushiobara-shi, Tochigi-ken 325-8501
- Climate: Cfa
- Website: Official website
- Symbols
- Flower: Yatsuo Tsutsuji (Rhododendron pentaphyllum var. nikoense)
- Tree: Pine

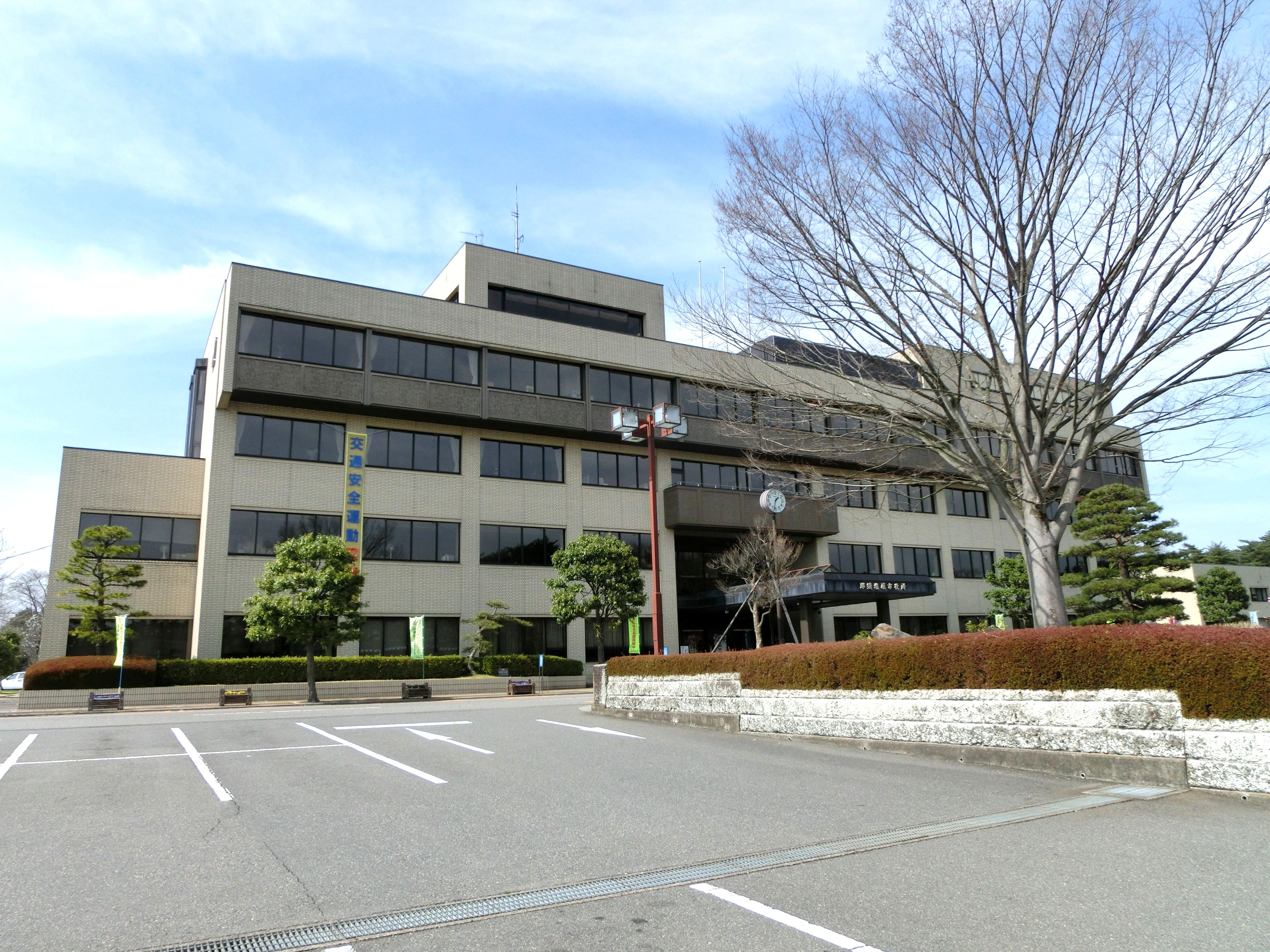
Nasushiobara City Hall

Nasushiobara (那須塩原市, Nasushiobara-shi) is a city located in Tochigi Prefecture, Japan. As of 1 August 2020, the city had an estimated population of 115,794 in 48,437 households, and a population density of 67 persons per km^{2}. The total area of the city is 592.74 square kilometres (228.86 sq mi).

== Geography ==
Nasushiobara is the northernmost city in the Kantō region of Japan, bordering Fukushima Prefecture to the north. It is located in the northern portion of Tochigi Prefecture, in the mountains.

=== Surrounding municipalities ===
Fukushima Prefecture

- Minamiaizu
- Nishigō
- Shimogō

Tochigi Prefecture

- Nasu
- Nikko
- Ōtawara
- Shioya
- Yaita

=== Climate ===
Nasushiobara has a humid subtropical climate (Köppen Cfa) characterized by warm to hot summers and cool winters with heavy snowfall. The average annual temperature in Nasushiobara is 12.1 °C (53.8 °F). The average annual rainfall is 1,552.5 mm (61.12 in) with July as the wettest month. The temperatures are highest on average in August, at around 23.8 °C (74.8 °F), and lowest in January, at around 0.9 °C (33.6 °F).

Climate data for Kuroiso, Nasushiobara (1991–2020 normals, extremes 1977–present)
Month	Jan	Feb	Mar	Apr	May	Jun	Jul	Aug	Sep	Oct	Nov	Dec	Year
Record high °C (°F)	15.3 (59.5)	20.6 (69.1)	22.9 (73.2)	28.4 (83.1)	31.8 (89.2)	34.6 (94.3)	35.5 (95.9)	35.3 (95.5)	33.3 (91.9)	28.8 (83.8)	23.1 (73.6)	22.0 (71.6)	35.5 (95.9)
Mean daily maximum °C (°F)	5.6 (42.1)	6.6 (43.9)	10.4 (50.7)	16.1 (61.0)	21.0 (69.8)	23.9 (75.0)	27.3 (81.1)	28.6 (83.5)	24.8 (76.6)	19.3 (66.7)	13.8 (56.8)	8.3 (46.9)	17.1 (62.8)
Daily mean °C (°F)	0.9 (33.6)	1.5 (34.7)	4.9 (40.8)	10.2 (50.4)	15.5 (59.9)	19.1 (66.4)	22.8 (73.0)	23.8 (74.8)	20.1 (68.2)	14.5 (58.1)	8.5 (47.3)	3.3 (37.9)	12.1 (53.8)
Mean daily minimum °C (°F)	−3.9 (25.0)	−3.4 (25.9)	−0.6 (30.9)	4.2 (39.6)	9.8 (49.6)	14.8 (58.6)	19.2 (66.6)	20.1 (68.2)	16.2 (61.2)	9.8 (49.6)	3.1 (37.6)	−1.8 (28.8)	7.3 (45.1)
Record low °C (°F)	−13.7 (7.3)	−12.2 (10.0)	−11.1 (12.0)	−6.1 (21.0)	−0.2 (31.6)	5.8 (42.4)	9.3 (48.7)	11.1 (52.0)	6.6 (43.9)	−1.6 (29.1)	−6.0 (21.2)	−11.0 (12.2)	−13.7 (7.3)
Average precipitation mm (inches)	32.9 (1.30)	32.4 (1.28)	81.0 (3.19)	111.0 (4.37)	143.3 (5.64)	175.1 (6.89)	254.5 (10.02)	234.0 (9.21)	230.3 (9.07)	158.3 (6.23)	73.9 (2.91)	41.3 (1.63)	1,552.5 (61.12)
Average precipitation days (≥ 1.0 mm)	4.7	5.2	8.0	10.0	11.3	14.5	16.8	14.3	13.2	9.9	6.5	5.4	119.8
Mean monthly sunshine hours	169.8	166.8	190.8	189.6	177.1	122.4	114.5	134.2	115.7	134.7	150.1	157.4	1,822.1
Source: Japan Meteorological Agency (1991–2020 normals, extremes 1977–present)

== Demographics ==
Per Japanese census data, the population of Nasushiobara has recently plateaued after a century of strong growth.

Historical population
Year	Pop.	±%
1920	35,992	—
1930	40,465	+12.4%
1940	44,613	+10.3%
1950	60,471	+35.5%
1960	60,948	+0.8%
1970	69,009	+13.2%
1980	85,436	+23.8%
1990	97,771	+14.4%
2000	110,828	+13.4%
2010	117,706	+6.2%
2020	115,210	−2.1%

== History ==
Before the Meiji period, the area which is now Nasushiobara was mostly uninhabited wasteland, due to lack of suitable water for agriculture. Ōtawara Domain built a number of irrigation canals during the Edo Period, but the scale was small. However, in the Meiji period, the Nasu Canal and other agricultural development projects aimed at opening the region to farming led to rapid development, and many local place names still bear the names of various government officials of the Meiji period. With the establishment of the modern municipalities system on April 1, 1889, the villages of Karino, Takabayashi, Nabekake, Nishi-Nasuno, Higashi-Nasuno in Nasu District, and Shiobara in Shioya District were formed. A portion of Higashi-Nasuno became the town of Kuroiso in 1912. Shiobara became a town in 1919, and Nishi-Nasuno in 1932. In 1955, Kuroiso annexed Takabayashi, Nabekake and the remainder of Higashi-Nasuno, and Nishi-Nasuno annexed Kariya. Kuroiso became a city in 1970, and Shiobara was transferred to Nasu District in 1982. The modern city of Nasushiobara was established on January 1, 2005, from the merger of the former city of Kuroiso, and the towns of Nishinasuno and Shiobara (both previously constituent towns of Nasu District).

== Government ==
Nasushiobara has a mayor-council form of government with a directly elected mayor and a unicameral city assembly of 26 members. Nasushiobara, together with the town of Nasu collectively contributes four members to the Tochigi Prefectural Assembly. In terms of national politics, the city is part of Tochigi 3rd district of the lower house of the Diet of Japan.

== Economy ==
Nasushiobara relies heavily on seasonal tourism to its hot spring and ski resorts. Agriculture is centered on dairy production. The city mascot, Miruhi, was created to represent the city's dairy production. The city also has several industrial parks.

== Education ==
- Utsunomiya Kyowa University
- Nasushiobara has 20 public primary schools, ten public middle schools and one combined primary/middle school operated by the city government. The city has four public high schools operated by the Tochigi Prefectural Board of Education. The prefectural also operates one special education school for the handicapped.

== Transportation ==
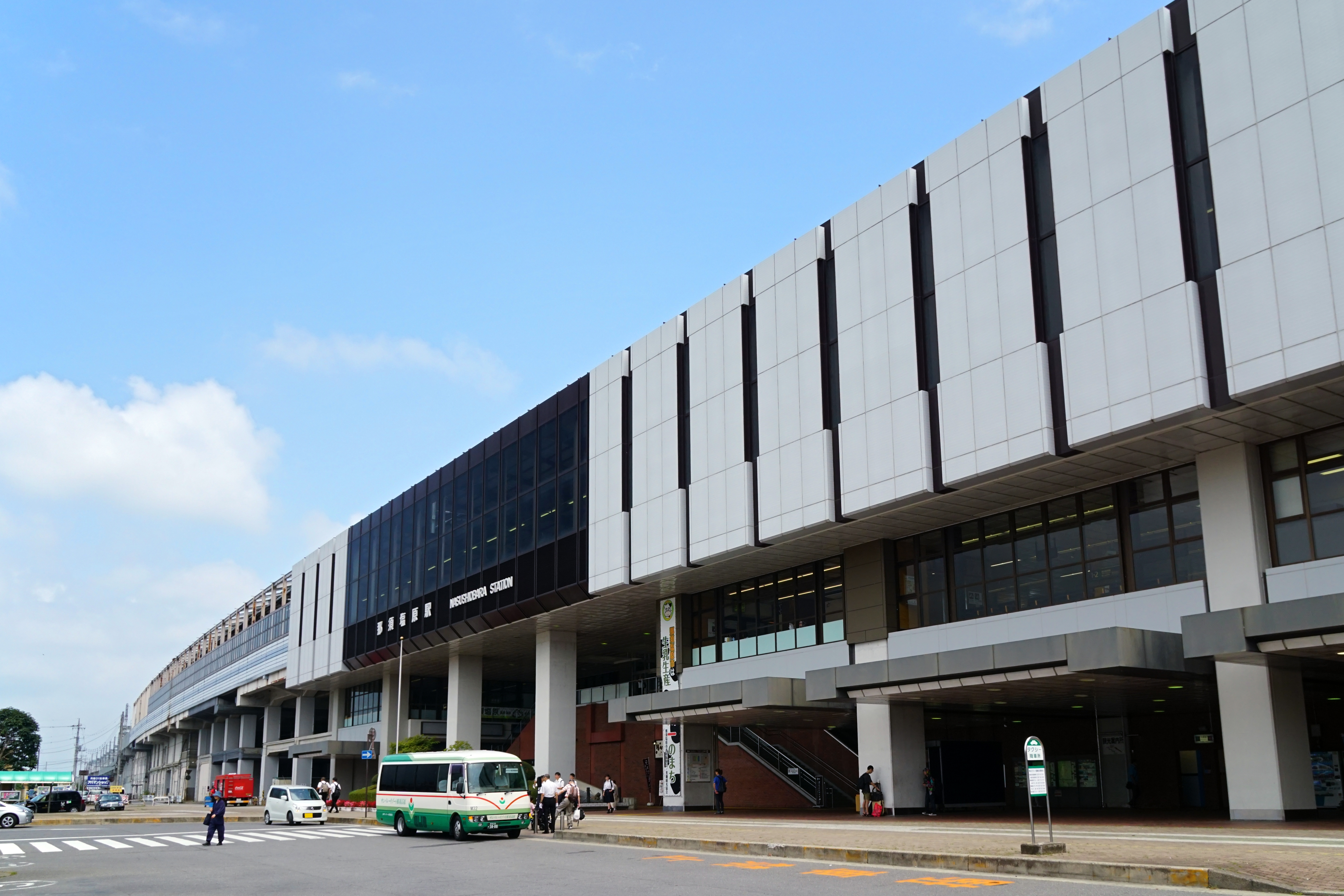
Nasushiobara Station

=== Railway ===
JR East – Tōhoku Shinkansen

- Nasushiobara

JR East –Tōhoku Main Line (Utsunomiya Line)

- Nishi-Nasuno – Nasushiobara – Kuroiso

=== Highway ===
- Tōhoku Expressway – Nishinasuno Interchange – Kuroiso Interchange
- National Route 4
- National Route 400
- National Route 461

== Local attractions ==
Nasushiobara serves as a gateway for tourism in northern Tochigi.

- Hunter Mountain Shiobara
- Itamuro onsen
- Momiji-dani Suspension Bridge
- Nogi Jinja (former residence of General Nogi Maresuke)
- former Shiobara Imperial Palace
- Shiobara onsen
- former house of Aoki Shuzo

== Notable people ==
- Hiromi Hara, professional football player
- Aya Hirayama, actress
- Yoshitomo Nara, artist
- Takashi Sanada, wheelchair tennis player
- Yoko Shibui, Olympic runner
- Masayoshi Takayama, three-star Michelin head chef of the Manhattan sushi restaurant Masa (born in Kuroiso)
- Yoshimi Watanabe, politician
