= List of municipal flags of Shikoku =

This page lists the municipal flags of Shikoku, Japan. It is a part of the List of Japanese municipal flags, which is split into regions due to its size.

== Complete lists of Japanese municipal flags pages ==
The regions of Japan. From northeast to southwest: Hokkaidō (red), Tōhoku (yellow), Kantō (green), Chūbu (cyan), Kansai (violet), Chūgoku (orange), Shikoku (purple), and Kyūshū & Okinawa (grey).

- List of municipal flags of Hokkaidō
- List of municipal flags of Tōhoku region
- List of municipal flags of Kantō region
- List of municipal flags of Chūbu region
- List of municipal flags of Kansai region
- List of municipal flags of Chūgoku region
- List of municipal flags of Shikoku
- List of municipal flags of Kyūshū

== Tokushima Prefecture ==
=== Cities ===
Municipality	Flag	Emblem	Enactment Date	Description	Ref.
Anan			October 1, 1958		
Awa					
Komatsushima			May 1936	Symbolizes how Komatsushima is a port city	
Mima			1 March 2005	Green fields in the form of an 'm' for Mima, a pink sun, blue for the Yoshino River	
Miyoshi			1 March 2006	A green M for Miyoshi	
Naruto					
Tokushima					
Yoshinogawa					

=== Towns and villages ===
Municipality	Flag	Emblem	Enactment Date	Description	Ref.
Aizumi					
Higashimiyoshi					
Ishii					
Itano					
Kaiyō					
Kamiita					
Kamikatsu					
Kamiyama					
Katsuura					
Kitajima					
Matsushige					
Minami					
Mugi					
Naka					
Sanagōchi					
Tsurugi					

=== Historical ===
Municipality	Flag	Emblem	Enactment Date	Description	Ref.
Aioi					
Anabuki					
Donari					
Handa					
Hanoura					
Higashiiyayama					
Hiwasa					
Ichiba					
Ichiu					
Ikawa					
Ikeda					
Kaifu					
Kainan					
Kaminaka					
Kamojima					
Kawashima					
Kisawa					
Kito					
Koyadaira					
Mikamo					
Mino					
Misato					
Miyoshi					
Nakagawa					
Nishiiyayama					
Sadamitsu					
Shishikui					
Wajiki					
Waki					
Yamakawa					
Yamashiro					
Yoshino					
Yuki					

== Kagawa Prefecture ==
=== Cities ===
Municipality	Flag	Emblem	Enactment Date	Description	Ref.
Higashikagawa					
Kan'onji					
Marugame					
Mitoyo					
Sakaide					
Sanuki					
Takamatsu					
Zentsūji					

=== Towns and villages ===
Municipality	Flag	Emblem	Enactment Date	Description	Ref.
Ayagawa					
Kotohira					
Mannō					
Miki					
Naoshima					
Shōdoshima					
Tadotsu					
Tonoshō					
Utazu					

== Ehime Prefecture ==
=== Cities ===
Municipality	Flag	Emblem	Enactment Date	Description	Ref.
Imabari					
Iyo					
Matsuyama					
Niihama					
Ōzu					
Saijō					
Seiyo					
Shikokuchūō					
Tōon					
Uwajima					
Yawatahama					

=== Towns and villages ===
Municipality	Flag	Emblem	Enactment Date	Description	Ref.
Ainan					
Ikata					
Kamijima					
Kihoku					
Kumakōgen					
Masaki					
Matsuno					
Tobe					
Uchiko					

== Kōchi Prefecture ==
=== Cities ===
Municipality	Flag	Emblem	Enactment Date	Description	Ref.
Aki					
Kami					
Kōchi					
Kōnan					
Muroto					
Nankoku					
Shimanto					
Sukumo					
Susaki					
Tosa					
Tosashimizu					

=== Towns and villages ===
Municipality	Flag	Emblem	Enactment Date	Description	Ref.
Geisei					
Hidaka					
Ino					
Kitagawa					
Kuroshio					
Mihara					
Motoyama					
Nahari					
Nakatosa					
Niyodogawa					
Ochi					
Ōkawa					
Ōtoyo					
Ōtsuki					
Sakawa					
Shimanto (town)					
Tano					
Tosa (town)					
Tōyō					
Tsuno					
Umaji					
Yasuda					
Yusuhara					
