= Lists of Japanese municipal flags =

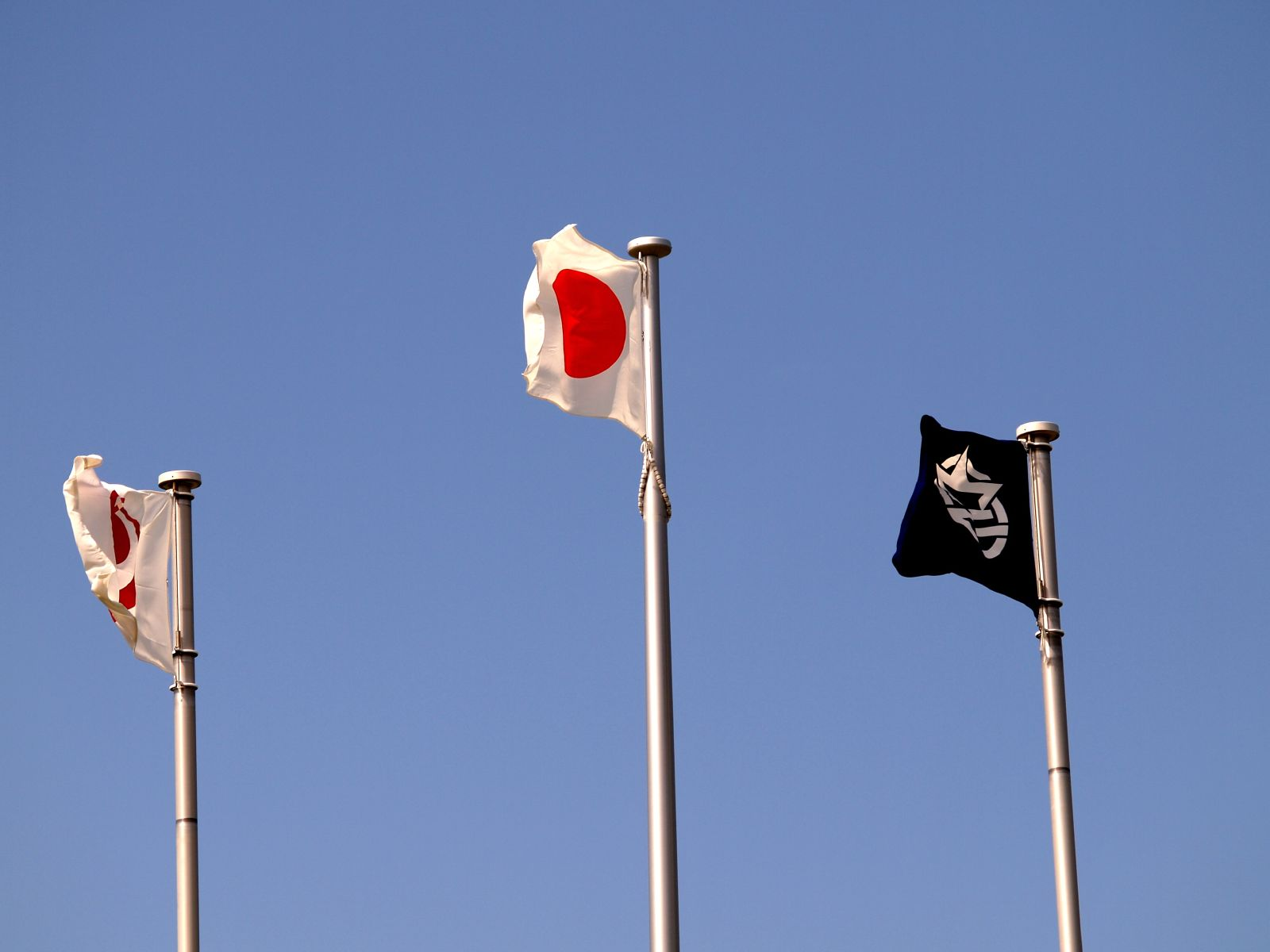
The Japanese flag flying with the flags of Okinawa Prefecture and Urasoe City

The list of Japanese municipal flags lists the flags of municipalities of Japan.

Most municipal flags of Japan, like prefectural flags, are a bicolor geometric highly stylized symbol (mon), often incorporating characters from Japanese writing system (kanji, hiragana, katakana, or rōmaji). However, there are three types of symbols (emblems, logos and crests). Therefore, the list will also discuss the emblems or logos.

== Complete lists of Japanese municipal flags pages ==
Because of its size, the list is split into 8 sub pages of regions:

map

1. List of municipal flags of Hokkaidō
2. List of municipal flags of Tōhoku region
3. List of municipal flags of Kantō region
4. List of municipal flags of Chūbu region
5. List of municipal flags of Kansai region
6. List of municipal flags of Chūgoku region
7. List of municipal flags of Shikoku
8. List of municipal flags of Kyūshū

== Flags of government ordinance cities ==
Chiba, Chiba

Fukuoka, Fukuoka

Hamamatsu, Shizuoka

Hiroshima, Hiroshima

Kawasaki, Kanagawa

Kitakyūshū, Fukuoka

Kobe, Hyōgo

Kumamoto, Kumamoto

Kyoto, Kyoto

Nagoya, Aichi

Niigata, Niigata

Okayama, Okayama

Osaka, Osaka

Sagamihara, Kanagawa

Saitama, Saitama

Sakai, Osaka

Sapporo, Hokkaido

Sendai, Miyagi

Shizuoka, Shizuoka

Yokohama, Kanagawa

== See also ==
- List of Japanese flags
- Flag of Japan
- Rising Sun Flag
