= List of municipal flags of Chūgoku region =

This page lists the municipal flags of Chūgoku region, Japan. It is a part of the List of Japanese municipal flags, which is split into regions due to its size.

== Complete lists of Japanese municipal flags pages ==
The regions of Japan. From northeast to southwest: Hokkaidō (red), Tōhoku (yellow), Kantō (green), Chūbu (cyan), Kansai (violet), Chūgoku (orange), Shikoku (purple), and Kyūshū & Okinawa (grey).

- List of municipal flags of Hokkaidō
- List of municipal flags of Tōhoku region
- List of municipal flags of Kantō region
- List of municipal flags of Chūbu region
- List of municipal flags of Kansai region
- List of municipal flags of Chūgoku region
- List of municipal flags of Shikoku
- List of municipal flags of Kyūshū

== Tottori Prefecture ==
=== Cities ===
Kurayoshi

Sakaiminato

Tottori

Yonago

=== Towns and villages ===
Chizu

Daisen

Hiezu

Hino

Hōki

Hokuei

Iwami

Kofu

Kotoura

Misasa

Nanbu

Nichinan

Wakasa

Yazu

Yurihama

=== Historical ===
Aimi

Akasaki

Aoya

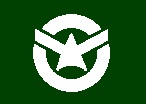
Daiei

Fukube (1969–2004)

Funaoka

Hatto

Hawai

Hōjō (1959–2005)

Kawahara

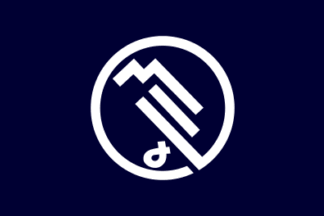
Ketaka

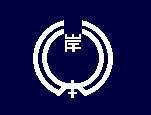
Kishimoto

Koge

Kokufu

Mizokuchi

Mochigase

Nakayama

Nawa

Saihaku

Saji

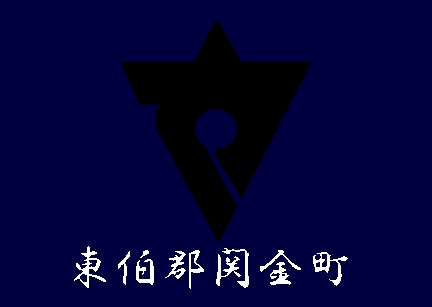
Sekigane

Shikano

Tōgō

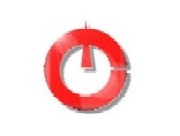
Tohaku

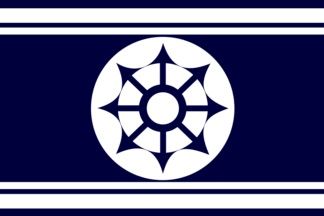
Tomari

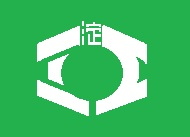
Yodoe

== Shimane Prefecture ==
=== Cities ===
Gotsu

Hamada

Izumo

Masuda

Matsue

Ōda

Unnan

Yasugi

=== Towns and villages ===
Ama

Chibu

Iinan

Kawamoto

Misato

Nishinoshima

Okinoshima

Okuizumo

Ōnan

Tsuwano

Yoshika

=== Historical ===
Akagi (1959–2005)

Asahi (1958–2005)

Daitō (1903–2004)

Daiwa (1967–2004)

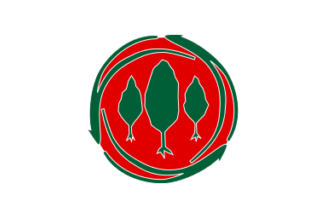
Fuse (1916–2004)

Goka (1979–2004)

Gotsu (1954–2004)

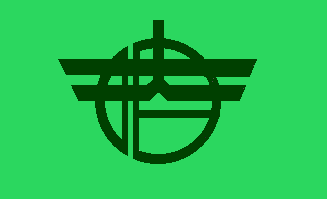
Hakuta (1954–2004)

Hasumi (1967–2004)

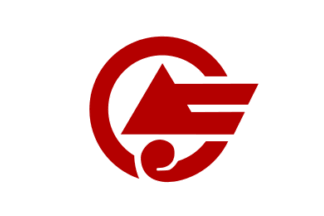
Higashiizumo (1963–2011)

Hikawa (1956–2011)

Hikimi (1956–2004)

Hirata (1955–2005)

Hirose (1899–2004)

Iwami (1957–2004)

Izumo (1947–2005)

Kakeya (1913–2004)

Kakinoki (1968–2005)

Kamo (1974–2004)

Kanagi (1960–2005)

Kashima (1971–2005)

Kisuki (1958–2004)

Koryō (1969–2005)

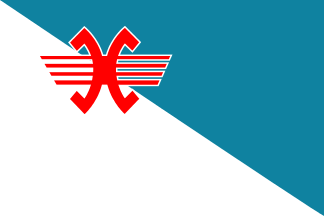
Mihonoseki (1957–2005)

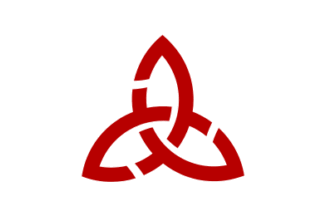
Misumi (1955–2005)

Mito (1955–2004)

Mitoya (1954–2004)

Mizuho (1964–2004)

Muikaichi (1970–2005)

Nichihara (1938–2005)

Nima (1954–2005)

Nita (1955–2005)

Ōchi (1958–2004)

Sada (1956–2005)

Saigō (1984–2004)

Sakurae (1956–2004)

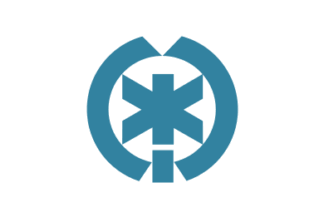
Shimane (1967–2005)

Shinji (1975–2005)

Taisha (1961–2005)

Taki (1966–2005)

Tamayu (1979–2005)

Tonbara (1958–2005)

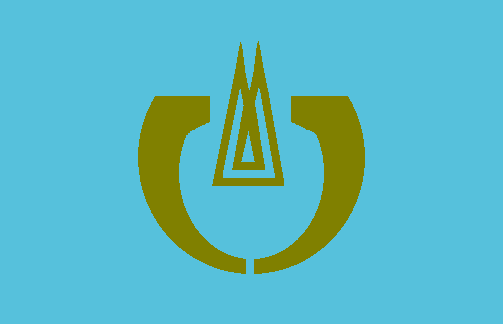
Tsuma (1979–2004)

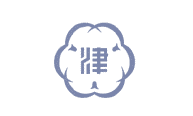
Tsuwano (1955–2005)

Yakumo (1954–2005)

Yasaka (1967–2005)

Yasugi (1954–2004)

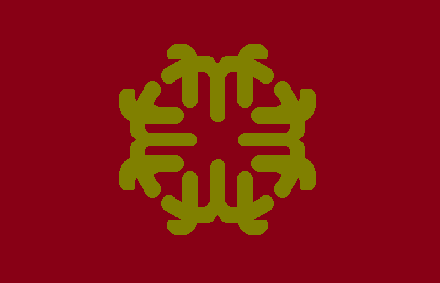
Yatsuka (1970–2005)

Yokota (1959–2005)

Yoshida (1889–2004)

Yunotsu (1954–2005)

== Okayama Prefecture ==
=== Cities ===
Akaiwa

Asakuchi

Bizen

Ibara

Kasaoka

Kurashiki

Maniwa

Mimasaka

Niimi

Okayama

Setouchi

Sōja

Takahashi

Tamano

Tsuyama

=== Towns and villages ===
Hayashima

Kagamino

Kibichuo

Kumenan

Misaki

Nagi

Nishiawakura

Satoshō

Shinjo

Shōō

Wake

Yakage

=== Historical ===
Bicchu

Funao

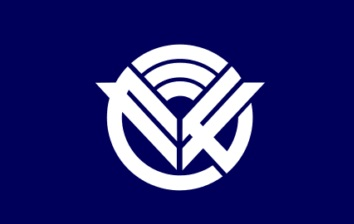
Kamogawa

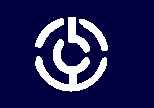
Kawakami

Kayo

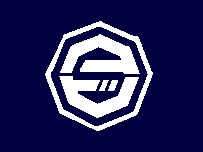
Mabi

Nariwa

Sōja (1954–2005)

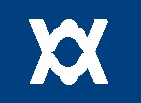
Ukan

== Hiroshima Prefecture ==
=== Cities ===
Akitakata

Etajima

Fuchū

Fukuyama

Hatsukaichi

Higashihiroshima

Hiroshima

Kure

Mihara

Miyoshi

Onomichi

Ōtake

Shōbara

Takehara

=== Towns ===
Akiōta

Fuchū

Jinsekikogen

Kaita

Kitahiroshima

Kumano

Ōsakikamijima

Saka

Sera

=== Historical ===
Akitsu (1953–2005)

Chiyoda (1968–2005)

Daiwa (1955–2005)

Etajima (1976–2004)

Fukutomi (1960–2005)

Funakoshi (1972–1975)

Funo (1960–2005)

Geihoku (1964–2005)

Higashino (1974–2003)

Hiwa (1991–2005)

Hongō (1955–2005)

Innoshima (1955–2005)

Itsukaichi (1968–1985)

Jinseki (1981–2004)

Jōge (1958–2004)

Kake (1970–2004)

Kamagari (1976–2005)

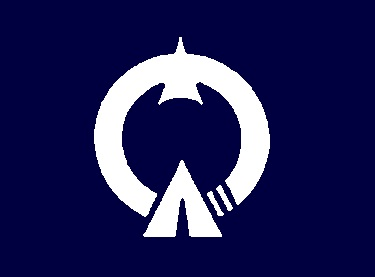
Kannabe (1984–2006)

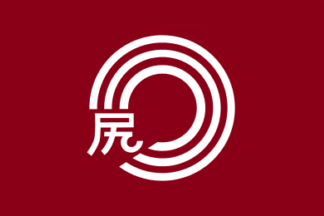
Kawajiri (1969–2004)

Kimita (1984–2004)

Kinoe (1955–2003)

Kisa (1957–2004)

Kōchi (1952–2005)

Kōnu (1975–2004)

Kōzan (1955–2004)

Kuchiwa (1978–2005)

Kui (1974–2005)

Kurahashi (1977–2005)

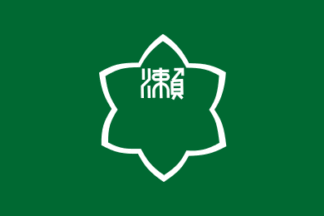
Kurose (1984–2005)

Midori (1975–2004)

Mihara (1937–2005)

Mirasaka (1971–2004)

Mitsugi (1958–2005)

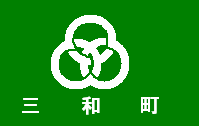
Miwa (1955–2004)

Miyajima (1971–2005)

Miyoshi (1954–1992)

Miyoshi (1992–2004)

Mukaihara (1983–2004)

Mukaishima (1961–2005)

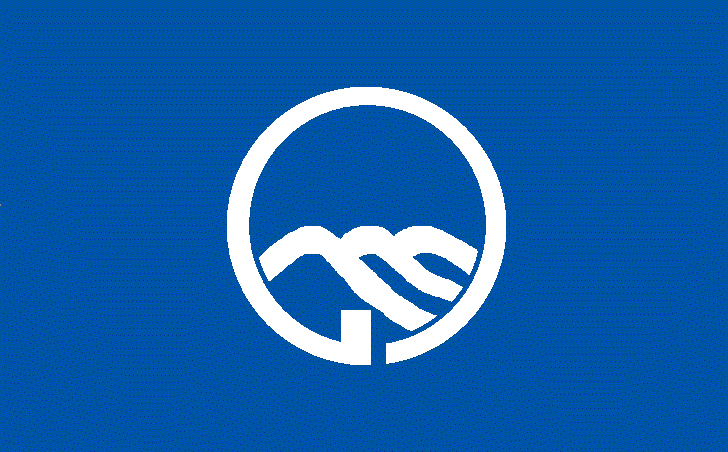
Nōmi (1982–2004)

Numakuma (1955–2005)

Ōasa (1974–2005)

Ōgaki (1974–2004)

Okimi (1979–2004)

Ondo (1979–2005)

Ōno (1970–2005)

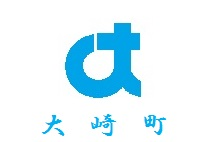
Ōsaki (1981–2003)

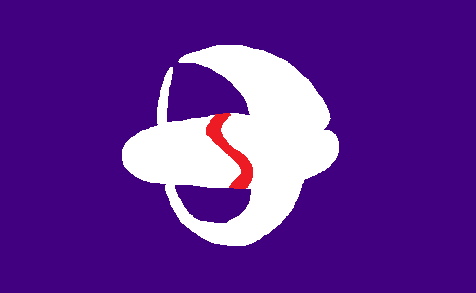
Saijō, Kamo (1968–1974)

Saijō, Shōbara (1964–2005)

Saiki (1955–2003)

Sakugi (1965–2004)

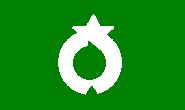
Sanwa (1965–2004)

Sera (1965–2004)

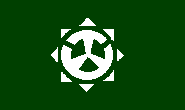
Seranishi (1979–2004)

Setoda (1937–2006)

Shimokamagari (1971–2003)

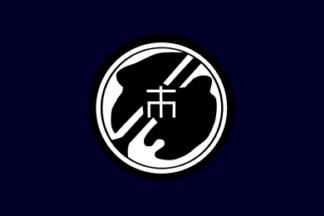
Shinichi (1958–2003)

Shōbara (1955–2005)

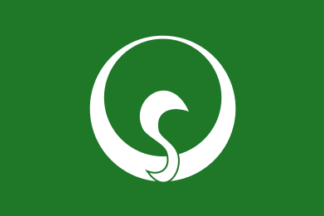
Sōryō (1965–2005)

Takamiya (1976–2004)

Takano (1984–2005)

Togouchi (1972–2004)

Tōjō (1965–2005)

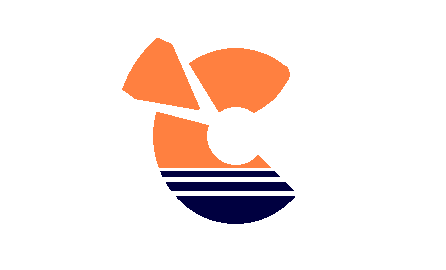
Toyohama (1988–2005)

Toyohira (1970–2005)

Toyomatsu (1978–2004)

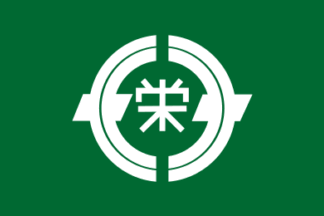
Toyosaka (1949–2005)

Tsutsuga (1990–2004)

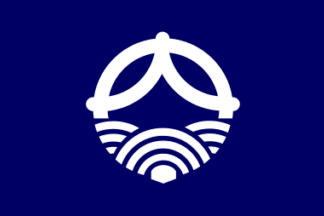
Uchinomi (1956–2003)

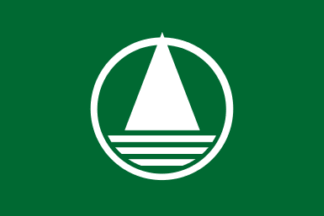
Yachiyo (1978–2004)

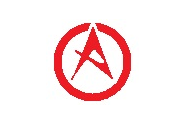
Yano (1967–1975)

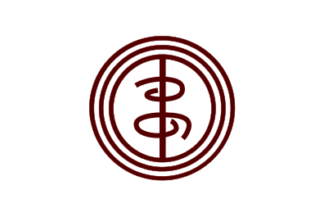
Yasuura (1948–2005)

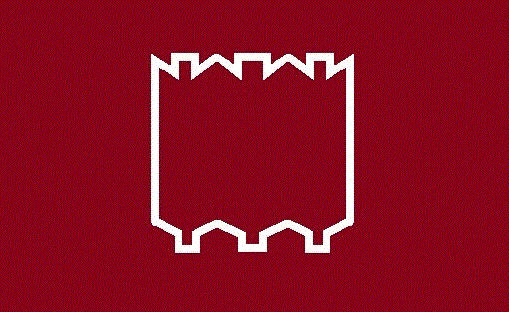
Yoshida (1955–2004)

Yoshiwa (1971–2003)

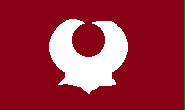
Yuki, Jinseki (1967–2004)

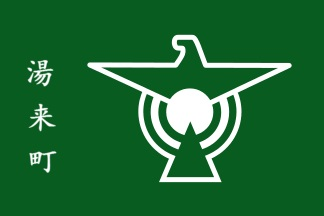
Yuki, Saeki (1959–2005)

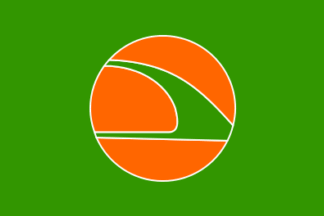
Yutaka (1980–2005)

== Yamaguchi Prefecture ==
=== Cities ===
Hagi

Hikari

Hōfu

Iwakuni

Kudamatsu

Mine

Nagato

San'yō-Onoda

Shimonoseki

Shūnan

Ube

Yamaguchi

Yanai

=== Towns ===
Abu

Hirao

Kaminoseki

Suō-Ōshima

Tabuse

Waki

=== Historical ===
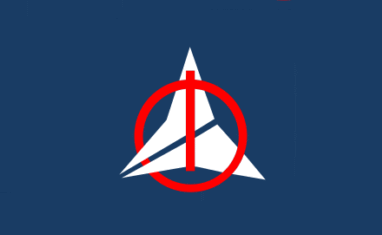
Kuka

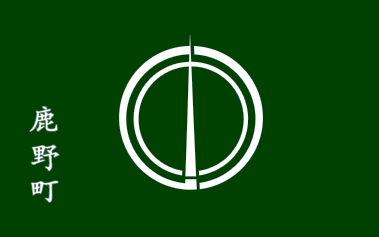
Kano

Ōshima

Shinnanyo

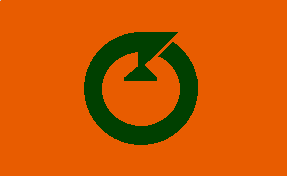
Tachibana

Tōwa

Tokuyama

== See also ==
- List of municipal flags of Hokkaidō
- List of municipal flags of Tōhoku region
- List of municipal flags of Kantō region
- List of municipal flags of Chūbu region
- List of municipal flags of Kansai region
- List of municipal flags of Shikoku
- List of municipal flags of Kyūshū
