= List of municipal flags of Kyūshū =

This page lists the municipal flags of Kyūshū, Japan. It is a part of the List of Japanese municipal flags, which is split into regions due to its size.

== Complete lists of Japanese municipal flags pages ==
The regions of Japan. From northeast to southwest: Hokkaidō (red), Tōhoku (yellow), Kantō (green), Chūbu (cyan), Kansai (violet), Chūgoku (orange), Shikoku (purple), and Kyūshū & Okinawa (grey).

- List of municipal flags of Hokkaidō
- List of municipal flags of Tōhoku region
- List of municipal flags of Kantō region
- List of municipal flags of Chūbu region
- List of municipal flags of Kansai region
- List of municipal flags of Chūgoku region
- List of municipal flags of Shikoku
- List of municipal flags of Kyūshū

== Fukuoka Prefecture ==
=== Cities ===
Asakura

Buzen

Chikugo

Chikushino

Dazaifu

Fukuoka

Fukutsu

Iizuka

Itoshima

Kama

Kasuga

Kitakyushu

Koga

Kurume

Miyama

Miyawaka

Munakata

Nakama

Nakagawa

Nōgata

Ogōri

Ōkawa

Ōmuta

Ōnojō

Tagawa

Ukiha

Yame

Yanagawa

Yukuhashi

=== Towns and villages ===
Aka

Ashiya

Chikujō

Chikuzen

Fukuchi

Hirokawa

Hisayama

Itoda

Kanda

Kasuya

Kawara

Kawasaki

Keisen

Kōge

Kotake

Kurate

Miyako

Mizumaki

Okagaki

Ōki

Onga

Ōtō

Sasaguri

Shime

Shingū

Soeda

Sue

Tachiarai

Tōhō

Umi

Yoshitomi

== Saga Prefecture ==
=== Cities ===
Imari

Kanzaki

Karatsu

Kashima

Ogi

Saga

Takeo

Taku

Tosu

Ureshino

=== Towns and villages ===
Arita

Genkai

Kamimine

Kiyama

Kōhoku

Miyaki

Ōmachi

Shiroishi

Tara

Yoshinogari

== Nagasaki Prefecture ==
=== Cities ===
Gotō

Hirado

Iki

Isahaya

Matsuura

Minamishimabara

Nagasaki

Ōmura

Saikai

Sasebo

Shimabara

Tsushima

Unzen

=== Towns ===
Hasami

Higashisonogi

Kawatana

Nagayo

Ojika

Saza

Shin-Kamigotō

Togitsu

== Kumamoto Prefecture ==
=== Cities ===
Amakusa

Arao

Aso

Hitoyoshi

Kami-Amakusa

Kikuchi

Kōshi

Kumamoto

Minamata

Tamana

Uki

Uto

Yamaga

Yatsushiro

=== Towns and villages ===
Asagiri

Ashikita

Gyokutō

Hikawa

Itsuki

Kashima

Kikuyō

Kōsa

Kuma

Mashiki

Mifune

Minamiaso

Minamioguni

Misato

Mizukami

Nagasu

Nagomi

Nankan

Nishihara

Nishiki

Oguni

Ōzu

Reihoku

Sagara

Takamori

Taragi

Tsunagi

Ubuyama

Yamae

Yamato

Yunomae

== Ōita Prefecture ==
=== Cities ===
Beppu

Bungo-ōno

Bungotakada

Hita

Kitsuki

Kunisaki

Nakatsu

Ōita

Saiki

Taketa

Tsukumi

Usa

Usuki

Yufu

=== Towns and villages ===
Hiji

Himeshima

Kokonoe

Kusu

== Miyazaki Prefecture ==
=== Cities ===
Ebino

Hyūga

Kobayashi

Kushima

Miyakonojō

Miyazaki

Nichinan

Nobeoka

Saito

=== Towns and villages ===
Aya

Gokase

Hinokage

Kadogawa

Kawaminami

Kijō

Kunitomi

Mimata

Misato

Morotsuka

Nishimera

Shiiba

Shintomi

Takachiho

Takaharu

Takanabe

Tsuno

== Kagoshima Prefecture ==
=== Cities ===
Aira

Akune

Amami

Hioki

Ibusuki

Ichikikushikino

Isa

Izumi

Kagoshima

Kanoya

Kirishima

Makurazaki

Minamikyūshū

Minamisatsuma

Nishinoomote

Satsumasendai

Shibushi

Soo

Tarumizu

=== Towns and villages ===
Amagi

China

Higashikushira

Isen

Kikai

Kimotsuki

Kinkō

Minamiōsumi

Minamitane

Mishima

Nagashima

Nakatane

Ōsaki

Satsuma

Setouchi

Tatsugō

Tokunoshima

Toshima

Uken

Wadomari

Yakushima

Yamato

Yoron

Yūsui

== Okinawa Prefecture ==
=== Cities ===
Municipality	Flag	Emblem	Enactment Date	Description	Ref.
Ginowan			Emblem: 17 June 1967; Flag: 1 July 1967	A blue flag with a white emblem. The emblem is a stylized version of "gino" (ギノ), with the "gi" (ギ) representing the wings of progress and the circle representing the bay, signifying harmony and peace in cooperation.	
Ishigaki			8 April 1967	A blue flag with a white emblem. The emblem is a stylized representation of the character for "gaki" (石), symbolizing the peace and boundless progress of.	
Itoman			1 December 1971	A purple flag with a white emblem. The emblem is based on the character "ito" (いと), with the circle representing the hope, harmony, and unity of the citizens, and the two flapping wings symbolizing the city's rapid development. Designed by Sato Sadao.	
Miyakojima			1 October 2005	A white flag with a blue, green and red emblem. The emblem is based on the hiragana character "mi" (み), the first letter of the city's name, and evokes the image of its citizens leaping into the future.	
Nago			8 August 1972	A white flag with a green emblem. The emblem, which is the initial letter of the city, "na" (ナ), is shaped like a dove taking off, symbolizing the city's eternal peace and limitless leaps. The blue-green color represents the citizens' desire to cultivate rich humanity in a natural environment.	
Naha			Emblem: 19 December 1921; Flag: 1 September 1965	A blue flag with a white emblem. The emblem is the city's name, "Naha" (ナハ), shaped into a circle, representing the ever-expanding Naha city.	
Nanjō			1 November 2006	A white flag with a blue, green and red emblem. The emblem is a stylized version of the letter "N", with the green representing abundant nature, the blue representing the fertile sea, and the red representing the sun, expressing the energetic citizens who will move forward into the future as a result of the merger.	
Okinawa			20 September 1974	A purple flag with a white emblem. The emblem of is designed to look like the letter "o" (お). It is made up of three tightly joined circles, representing harmony, hope, and peace among the city's citizens.	
Tomigusuku			1 April 2002	A purple flag with a white emblem. The "to" (と) is arranged three times to form "tomi" (とみ), and the stacked circles represent the castle being built. The three interlocking circles each bring dialogue to the center, representing harmony. The arrows extending outward represent infinite expansion and development. The whole represents the spirit of the city's citizens as they build harmony and limitless development.	
Tomigusuku			1 April 2002	Textless variant.	
Urasoe			Emblem: 26 June 1961; Flag: 8 May 1974	An indigo flag with a white emblem. The indigo represents the indigo of the "Urasoe style" Bingata dyeing, a traditional craft that was passed down to Urasoe, and symbolizes the ever-progressing city, while the white colour of the emblem represents the improvement of bright and healthy lives for its citizens. The emblem symbolizes Urasoe as an "endlessly progressing peaceful town." The protruding part of the "u" (ウ) represents an attitude of endless progress, and the four characters of "Urasoe" (ウラソエ) are arranged in a circle to represent peace.	
Uruma			1 May 2006	A white flag with an emblem. The emblem is a stylized version of the "u" (う), with red representing the sun, green representing the earth, and blue representing the sea. It expresses the harmony and peace of the citizens amidst a circle of abundant nature, and symbolizes the bright future and further progress of Uruma, which is developing facing Kin Bay and Nakagusuku Bay.	

=== Towns and villages ===
Municipality	Flag	Emblem	Enactment Date	Description	Ref.
Aguni			3 November 1981	A blue flag with a green emblem. The emblem features the initial letter "a" (ア), which symbolizes Aguni, against a blue background that represents the sea, and is tailored to the shape of the island. The design is made up of three parts, each representing the three "ka" (う) characters in Aguni. The bottom quadrangle represents the strong unity of the villagers, and the arc spreading upward symbolizes the village's boundless development.	
Chatan			Emblem: 2 April 1973; Flag: 1 April 1980	A white flag with a red emblem. The emblem of Chatan combines the two kanji of the town (北谷), with the design of a bird flying over the earth. The circle represents citizen harmony while the flying bird symbolizes town development.	
Ginoza			27 November 1976	A green flag with an orange emblem. The emblem is a stylized "gi" (ぎ). The sharp angle extending to the left of the emblem represents the development of the village, and the circle represents harmony among the villagers. Regarding the flag, green represents peace, and orange represents abundance of crops.	
Haebaru			18 April 1965	A maroon flag with an orange emblem. The town emblem uses the initial letter "ha" from the town name and is stylized to resemble a bird soaring high, expressing the town's peace, harmony, unity and cooperation, and also symbolizing in a simple and clear way the rapid growth and expansion of its industrial culture. The design also features wave crests, which are meant to represent the eternally flowing Kokuba River.	
Higashi			1 April 1978	A dark blue flag with a yellow emblem. The emblem is a stylized rendition of the village's name (東). The emblem is a depiction of light to represent the sun rising over the eastern horizon, and its shadow widens, symbolizing the endless development of the village. Yellow represents the golden sun which in turn represents the village's crops and harvest while dark blue represents the wisdom of the villagers.	
Ie			1 April 1983	A white flag with a green emblem. The emblem is the katakana arrangement of the village's name (イエ), with the circle representing harmony among the villagers, the hoe cultivating the earth representing the villagers at work, and the wings representing the village's limitless leaps and development.	
Iheya			1 April 1983	A white flag with a green emblem. The emblem is based on the katakana character "ihe" (イヘ) which is stylized in the image of a flying bird, representing the harmony, peace and unity of the village, as well as a powerful symbol of the rapid development of industrial culture.	
Izena			15 August 1969	A white flag with a red emblem. The emblem is the katakana arrangement of the village's name (イゼナ). The circle symbolizes the friendship among the villagers. It is meant to convey the hope for endless development.	
Kadena			Emblem: 17 May 1973; Flag: 1 July 1985	A white flag with a blue emblem. The emblem contains the hiragana initials of the town's name (かでな) that are stylized in the image of flying to represent the friendship and unity of the townspeople, and the symbolize the improvement and development of the town in a simple and clear way.	
Kin			7 November 1977	A blue flag with a yellow emblem. The emblem depicts the first character of the town's name (金), turned into a circle and wings, the town emblem represents the town's soaring development and also expresses the peace, harmony, and unity of the townspeople. This emblem is a powerful symbol of the town's shining future.	
Kitadaitō			19 March 1979	A white flag with an emblem. The emblem contains a central character represents the harmony, unity, and peace of the residents of the village, while the outer frame is a stylized version of the character for "kita" (北). The widening shape on all four sides symbolizes the village's boundless growth. The red "daito" (大東) represents fertile soil, the green curves on both sides enveloping the character represent bountiful sugarcane harvests, and the four blue sides represent the boundless expanse of the sea.	
Kitanakagusuku			20 May 1980	A green flag with a white emblem. The emblem is a stylized representation of the characters for "kita" (北) and "naka" (中). The circle represents the village's peace, cooperation, and unity, while the characters for "kita" and "naka" on the left and right symbolize the villagers pooling their wisdom to leap forward and develop into the future.	
Kumejima			25 May 2004	A maroon flag with an emblem. Since ancient times, the town has long been known as "Kumi" (meaning sphere beauty) and then "Kumejima". The emblem expresses this origin of the town's name by placing "ku" (く) and "mi" (三 or み) side by side, creating a dynamic form that symbolizes the further development of Kumejima Town. The outer ring (oval) symbolizes the harmony of the people of the town. The green represents the beautiful greenery of the island, and symbolizes youth and abundance. The blue represents the clear sea and sky, and symbolizes deep friendship and limitless exchange.	
Kunigami			1 April 1972	A purple flag with a green emblem. The emblem is a stylized version of the "kuni" (くに) from the village's name, depicting the mountains and forests, and represents the village's topography, harmony, peace, and unity, as well as the vigorous development of industry and culture in a simple and clear way.	
Minamidaitō			27 December 1976	A white flag with a green emblem. The emblem is an circular arrangement the village's name (ミナミ大), with the six lines on top representing the six characters for the village, "mi mi" (ミ・ミ) from Minami, the lower semicircle representing the "na" (ナ) of the village, and the "dai" (大) in the center representing the unity of the villagers.	
Motobu			15 December 1966	A blue flag with an orange emblem. The emblem is a stylized version of the initials of the town "hon" or "motu" (本), emphasizing the character "Nihon" or Japan (日本). The circle represents peace and harmony, and the feathers on both wings symbolize the town's rapid development.	
Nakagusuku			15 December 1966	A white flag with an emblem. The emblem contains a circle represents the harmony of the villagers, the comma is a representation of the Gosamaru crest and represents sincerity, and the character "naka" (中) and its protruding part represent the village name and development. The red represents the passion of the villagers. The yellow-green represents the rich and fertile green fields, and the blue represents the blue of the sea and sky of Nakagusuku Bay, expressing the beautiful natural scenery of the village.	
Nakijin			8 November 1973	A white flag with an emblem. The emblem is a modern arrangement of the "naka" (今). The triangular flame represents the villagers' initiative and limitless development of potential, while the central circle represents peace, fulfillment, and mutual prosperity, symbolizing the formation of a community that protects and cultivates these. The triangle's identical top and bottom represent true democracy, where each person's position and opinion is equally respected, and comradeship in the pursuit of local love.	
Nishihara			Emblem: 3 July 1968; Flag: 1 April 1986	A blue flag with a white emblem. The emblem is a stylized version of the initial "nishi" (西) of the town's name, with the circle representing the harmony and unity of the townspeople and the wings representing the town's dynamic development, clearly and powerfully symbolizing the bright future of the town.	
Ōgimi			1 January 1972	A green flag with a yellow emblem. The emblem is the character "O" (大) that has been designed with a modern sensibility, and the circle represents the harmony and unity of the villagers, while the wings extending to the left represent the vigorous development of the village, succinctly and powerfully symbolizing the bright future of the village.	
Onna			15 May 1973	A green flag with a yellow emblem. The emblem is the horizontal design of the village's name (オンナ) to symbolize peace and unity among the villagers, while the sharp extensions on both sides symbolize the village's rapid development amidst peace. The emblem and the flag was adopted to commemorate 1st anniversary of Okinawa joining Japan as the 47th prefecture.	
Taketomi			20 January 1970	A blue flag with a white emblem. The emblem is a stylized version of "tate" (竹) from the town's name, and like bamboo, it represents tenacity and prosperity, while the circle represents the harmony of the townspeople who connect the outlying islands and the boundless progress of Taketomi Town.	
Tarama			22 April 1973	A green flag with a yellow emblem. The emblem represents the "ta" (多) from the village's name. The outer lines symbolize the harmony among the villagers, while the parallel lines in the middle represent equality and the village's limitless potential for development.	
Tokashiki			15 July 1972	A blue flag with a red emblem. The emblem contains "toka" (とか) that is designed in a circular shape. The circle represents harmony and unity among the villagers, the key in the center represents the development of the village, and the wings symbolize rapid development.	
Tonaki			18 December 1971	A maroon flag with a white emblem. The emblem is a stylized version of the katakana character the village's name (トナキ). The characters "to" (ト) and "na" (ナ) form a circle, representing the harmonious and strong unity of the villagers. The "ki" (キ) represents joy, and to always emphasize peace and development with joy at the center, two horizontal lines of the "ki" are extended outside the circle from the center, expressing the desire for limitless prosperity for the village.	
Yaese			19 June 2006	A purple flag with an emblem. The emblem contains an initial "ya" (八) that resembles Mount Yaese, and the vibrant green represents the vitality of the earth. The central circle represents the spirit of the townspeople, who strive for harmony in town development. The bright, warm orange represents the spirit of Umanchu. The light blue portion represents the town as a clean town coexisting with nature that thrives at the foot of the mountain. The emblem is designed by Yumi Nakamura from Sapporo, Hokkaido.	
Yomitan			14 December 1976	A blue flag with an orange emblem. The "yo" (よ) and "mi" (み) in the emblem represent the cooperation of the villagers, while the feather shape represents the village's leap forward. The outer circle represents harmony among the villagers. The blank space surrounded by the power of unity symbolizes the village's prosperity and development.	
Yonabaru			Emblem: 1 April 1973; Flag: 12 December 1994	A white flag with a blue emblem. The emblem is a "yo" of that is stylized as an image of waves and a bird, expressing the harmony and peaceful unity of the town, as well as a powerful symbol of the town's rapid industrial development.	
Yonaguni			28 December 1965	A blue flag with a white emblem. The emblem is a "yo" (与), "na" (那) and "guni" (国) that are grouped together to represent the town's bright and growing image.	
Zamami			1 May 1966	A blue flag with a white emblem. The emblem is a "za" (ザ). The navy blue (from the flag) and yellow (from the emblem) represent the island's abundance, while the circular sections and horizontal line in the center represent the island's peace and limitless development.	

=== Former ===
Municipality	Flag	Emblem	Enactment Date Abolition Date	Description	Ref.
Chatan			Emblem: 1 April 1908; Flag: 1 April 1908 Emblem: 2 April 1973; Flag: 1 April 1980	A white flag with a black emblem. The emblem combines the two kanji of the village (北谷) while being surrounded by rice stalks.	
Taketomi			1 April 1948 20 January 1970	A green flag with a white emblem. The emblem is a stylized "take" (竹).	
Nago			6 May 1964 1 August 1970	A blue flag with a white emblem. The emblem is a stylized version of town's name (ナゴ) to represent peace, compassion, cooperation, and prosperity.	

=== Historical ===
Municipality	Flag	Emblem	Enactment Date Abolition Date	Description	Ref.
Chinen			January 1966 1 January 2006	A yellow flag with a green emblem. The emblem is based on the immense beauty of Sefa-utaki, said to be the birthplace of mankind, and the Teda river, a sacred site on the Agarimai pilgrimage. The square within the circle represents the immense beauty of Sefa-utaki, the inner circle represents the Teda river, and the outer circle represents boundless prosperity based on harmony and unity among the villagers.	
Gushikami			26 December 1975 1 January 2006	A navy blue flag with a white emblem.	
Gushikawa (city)			2 August 1968 1 April 2005	A blue flag with a white emblem.	
Gushikawa (village)			January 1968 1 April 2002	A blue flag with a white emblem.	
Gusukube			22 January 1968 1 October 2005	A maroon flag with a white emblem.	
Kochinda			26 December 1975 1 January 2006	A purple flag with a white emblem.	
Ōhama			May 1962 1 June 1964	A white flag with a black emblem. The emblem is a stylized "o" (大).	
Ōzato			20 September 1967 1 January 2006	A maroon flag with an emblem. The emblem symbolizes sugarcane, the village's main crop, the leaves are used to form a large tatami, and it is the of harmony and sympathy, expressing a simple, peaceful village that is rational and passionate. The emblem also contains the name of the village (大里).	
Sashiki			1 June 1980 1 January 2006	A purple flag with a yellow emblem. The emblem is a stylized version of the character "sa" (サ), representing a large tatami mat (one tou tatami), inviting prayers for bountiful grains and peace, and symbolizing the town's endless development.	
Shuri			20 May 1921 1 June 1954	A white flag with a black emblem. The emblem is a stylized version of the character "ri" (り) surrounded by four "yu" (ユ).	
Tamagusuku			15 February 1977 1 January 2006	A purple flag with a yellow emblem. The emblem is a stylized version of "tama" (玉) and symbolizes the peace and cooperation of the villagers and the growing village. The outer circle represents the peace and cooperation of the villagers, while the acute angle to the right of the circle represents the progress and development of the village.	
Yagaji			16 May 1946 1 August 1970	A white flag with a green emblem. The emblem is a stylized version of "Y".	

Hirara

Irabu

Ishikawa

Katsuren

Koza

Nakazato

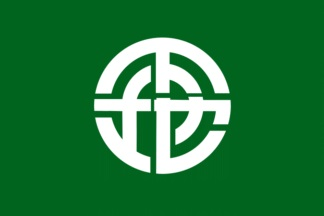
Shimoji

Ueno

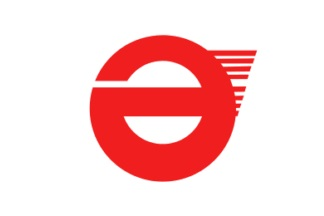
Yonashiro
