= List of municipal flags of Tōhoku region =

This page lists the municipal flags of Tōhoku region, Japan. It is a part of the List of Japanese municipal flags, which is split into regions due to its size.

== Complete lists of Japanese municipal flags pages ==
The regions of Japan. From northeast to southwest: Hokkaidō (red), Tōhoku (yellow), Kantō (green), Chūbu (cyan), Kansai (violet), Chūgoku (orange), Shikoku (purple), and Kyūshū & Okinawa (grey).

- List of municipal flags of Hokkaidō
- List of municipal flags of Tōhoku region
- List of municipal flags of Kantō region
- List of municipal flags of Chūbu region
- List of municipal flags of Kansai region
- List of municipal flags of Chūgoku region
- List of municipal flags of Shikoku
- List of municipal flags of Kyūshū

== Aomori Prefecture ==
=== Cities ===
Municipality	Flag	Emblem	Enactment Date	Description	Ref.
Aomori			Enactment: April 1901; Specification: 26 July 1972; Inheritance: 27 April 2005; Flag: 12 May 2005	A white flag with a green and blue stylized "ao" (青). White represents cleanliness, blue for Mutsu Bay and the moon and green for the stars. The emblem is a representation of the Polaris star and represents the city's location in Aomori Prefecture, the northernmost prefecture of Honshu.	
Goshogawara			1 July 2005	A yellow flag with a styled "G". The blue crescent (symbolizing the Sea of Japan, Lake Juso, and the Iwaki River), a green arrow (for the Tsugaru Plain) and a red circle (for apples and the sun). The emblem as a whole represent humanity and nature through the spoils of riches of livelihood and mobility.	
Hachinohe			27 August 1937	A white flag with a red or blue stylized "hachi" (八). Inside sits a red stylized "nohe" (戸) in the form of a crane to represent development. The emblem contains the "Mukaizuru" crest, the crest of the Nanbu clan. They are adopted through a contest.	
Hirakawa			1 January 2006	A white flag with a forest green, lime green, and red emblem in the form of a stylized hi (ひ). The greens represent nature while the red dot represents the sun. The emblem also evokes images of "abundant nature," "rich harvest (apples)," and "energetic citizens," and is a friendly symbol of the city and its citizens leaping forward into the future.	
Hirosaki			Enactment: 14 June 1900; Inheritance: 15 November 2006	A white flag with a red Buddhist cross. This cross was used by the Tsugaru Domain to represent peace and merit and it is a sign of good fortune and virtue.	
Kuroishi			1 April 1889	A blue flag with a white emblem. The flag and the emblem is the Kuroishi Domain's flag and alternate crest. The town emblem, which Kuroishi Town used from 1889, has remained in use since the town was incorporated as a city. It is said that as far back as China's Spring and Autumn Period (approximately 2,500 years ago), the futsu (star) was one of the 12 rank symbols used on official uniforms. The Kuroishi Domain's crest incorporated the family crest, the five-leaf peony, and the alternate crest, "futsu" (ふつ). "futsu" was also used on the flag. This pattern was embroidered on the formal uniforms of ancient Chinese officials, and "futsu" was one of the 12 ranks, representing the feudal lord class. The pattern is said to have been directly translated into Japanese characters, and is written as "futsu." It means "a formal uniform pattern with the characters for "self" or "bow" facing back to back." "Futsu" also means "a subject's turning away from evil and turning toward good," and is said to be seen on King Enma's formal uniform. Based on these facts, the most likely theory is that the founder of the domain, Lord Nobuhide, used the "Futsu" design, which features two bows, a symbol of the samurai class, back to back, as the curtain crest, alternate crest, and flag emblem.	
Misawa			Enactment: 1916; Inheritance: 25 November 1958; Flag: 1 September 1988	A green flag with a gold emblem. The emblem is three "sa" (サ) arranged in a circle, meaning "Misawa." The arrows are decorated with pine needles, a natural resource. It was designed by Kitamura Kaname in 1916.	
Mutsu			Emblem: 1 November 1960; Flag: 19 December 2008	A purple flag with a white emblem. The emblem is a stylized version of the hiragana character "Mutsu" (むつ), symbolizing harmony and rapid development.	
Towada			14 March 2005	A white flag with a blue and green emblem. The blue part at the top of the emblem is designed to resemble Lake Towada, representing abundant, clean water, while the green part at the bottom represents rich, fresh nature.	
Tsugaru			11 February 2005	A white flag with an emblem. The emblem is a stylized version of the first letter of Tsugaru City's name, "tsu" (つ), and depicts ripe rice ears and the beautiful waves of the Sea of Japan. The number of ovals representing rice and wave spray refers to the five former towns and villages. It symbolizes the harmonious development of the city in harmony with nature.	

=== Towns and villages ===
Municipality	Flag	Emblem	Enactment Date	Description	Ref.
Ajigasawa			10 May 1977	A blue flag with a white emblem. The emblem is the town's name in stylized hiragana (あじがさわ). The circle (which is a "wa/わ") represents harmony and the "a" (あ) and the "sa" (さ) represents development.	
Fujisaki			Enactment: March 1972; Inheritance: 21 September 2005	A white flag with a stylized "F". Red stands for the apples and passion, yellow for rice and peace and purple for swans and proudness. Designed by Mr. Ishizawa from Aomori.	
Fukaura			31 March 2005	A purple flag with a white emblem. The emblem consists of a stylized "fu" (フ) being surrounded by a wave to symbolize harmonious development through unity.	
Gonohe			1 July 1961	A green flag with a white emblem. The emblem is the town's name in white stylized kanji (五戸). It symbolizes unity through development.	
Hashikami			1 August 1964	A blue flag with an emblem. The emblem features the character for "kami" (上上) and the character for "hashi" (上) placed on top of it, symbolizing a desire for a life that is always on the upswing, and the circle symbolizes peace and cooperation. It is one of selected works that was solicited from townspeople.	
Higashidōri			1 October 1973	A white flag with a green emblem. The emblem is based on the topography of Higashidori, symbolizes the harmony between nature and life, the leap in industrial culture, and the village's boundless future development. Designed by Noriko Kubota.	
Hiranai			22 March 1963	A green flag with a white emblem. The emblem combines the flat area of Hiranai with a swan shaped in a "hira" (平), surrounded by camellia flowers, and the swan's wings represent constant construction and rapid development.	
Imabetsu			25 December 1965	A green flag with a white emblem. The emblem is a stylized version of the characters "Imabe," with "ima" (今) surrounded by a circle, and "betsu" (別) representing the will of the townspeople to strive for pure and righteous harmony, as well as the three routes of railway, highway, and pedestrians that connect Honshu and Hokkaido through the Seikan Tunnel. The design is typical of Imabetsu, the town at the entrance to the Seikan Tunnel.	
Inakadate			15 August 1959	A purple flag with a white emblem. The circle, which symbolizes unity and harmony, contains the character for rice field (田), which is also the initial letter of Inakadate and represents the image of a village with ripening ears of rice, and above it is a castle that tells the story of the village's history. The design was created in 1959, after being selected from a public competition, and was created by Takagi Haruo, who was working at Kawabe Elementary School at the time.	
Itayanagi			5 January 1965	A maroon flag with a white emblem. The "I" (イ) of the willow tree is depicted as an apple, the town's main product, and is expressed in a beautiful, unconventional style, symbolizing the town's rapid development and the harmony and unity of its residents. It was established on 5 January 1965 to commemorate the 10th anniversary of the merger of the town and village.	
Kazamaura			14 May 1971	A white flag with a green emblem. The emblem represents the three characters of Kazamaura, with circles representing the village's resources of tourism, fisheries, and forestry, and is designed to represent the village's development based on these three.	
Nakadomari			28 March 2005	A white flag with an emblem. Based on the character "naka" (中), the logo symbolizes people active in the midst of abundant nature. Orange represents the sun, blue the sea and sky, and green the land, representing the town of Nakadomari blessed with nature.	
Nanbu			1 January 2006	A white flag with an emblem. The emblem is based on the lush greenery of Mount Nakui and the pure flow of the Mabechi River, two things that Nanbu is proud of. The two red circles represent the bountiful harvest of agricultural products and symbolize the future vision of the town, which develops in harmony with people and nature.	
Nishimeya			14 December 1966	A green flag with a white emblem. The design is a stylized version of the initial letter "nishi" (にし), and features a dove, a symbol of peace, with the wings symbolizing the village's boundless growth and development.	
Noheji			24 November 1961	A purple flag with a white emblem. The emblem represents the character "no" (の), which is the initial letter of Noheji, and also includes a wave crest, which is reminiscent of progress, and expresses progress, development, and unity.	
Oirase			1 March 2006	A white flags with an emblem. The characters for the town's name themselves were designed to take advantage of the softness of hiragana, and the circle represents the cooperation of the townspeople. The green represents the image of a rural town with a rich natural environment and a friendly atmosphere, the blue represents the clear waters of the Oirase River and the powerful Pacific Ocean, and the red represents the vitality of the residents.	
Ōma			25 August 1966	A blue flag with a white emblem. The three "ō" (大) symbolizes the three settlements that make up Oma Town (Oma, Okudo, and Zaimoku), and represents harmony and unity.	
Ōwani			1 July 1964	A purple flag with a white emblem. The "ō" (大) represents the town's rapid development, and the two rings represent crocodiles, representing harmony and unity.	
Rokkasho			9 February 1966	A green flag with a white emblem. The emblem is a stylized version of the number six (六), with the upper part representing rapid progress and development, and the two lines at the bottom powerfully expressing harmony among the villagers.	
Rokunohe			1 October 1960	A green flag with a white emblem. The emblem, which symbolizes the development of a bright and prosperous town, is a design made up of the six "to" (戸) from the six towns of Rokunohe, each holding hands and representing great progress. Designed by Mitsuyuki Yaegashi.	
Sai			Emblem: 18 July 1972; Flag: 14 May 1971	A white flag with a blue emblem. The emblem is a modern take on the initial letter "sa" (さ), with the thick circle representing the harmony and unity of the villagers, and the shape of Asuka symbolizing the rapid development of the village in areas such as industry and culture.	
Sannohe			Emblem: 20 March 1955; Flag: 1 October 1977	The flag features the emblem on its front, and the three colors of light green, orange, and crimson represent the youthfulness and energetic passion of Sannohe as it moves toward the future, symbolizing the overall development of Sannohe.	
Shichinohe			8 September 2005	A green flag with an emblem. The new town of Shichinohe was born from the merger of Shichinohe and Tenmabayashi. The symbol mark that represents the image of the town is based on the character "shichi" (七), which combines the "te" (て) of Tenmabayashi and the "shi" (し) of Shichinohe, and was created based on the concept that the two will come together to create the town. Furthermore, it embodies the spirit of aiming to revitalize and develop the town by appealing to the shape of the "shichi."	
Shingō			26 March 1973	A green flag with a white emblem. The emblem of is a combination of the two characters "shi" (し) and "n" (ん), which represent progress, leaps, and peace, with the meaning of spreading one's wings wide into the sky like a bird.	
Sotogahama			28 March 2005	A white flag with an emblem. Using the character "so" (そ) as a motif, the lush green peninsula, the blue sea, and the merger of the three towns and villages are carried by three powerful winds, expressing new town development and leaps forward.	
Takko			4 April 1935	A green flag with a white emblem. The emblem was conceived by the late Nobuzo Sato. The idea for the emblem came from the wheels of the town buses that were in operation at the time, and it embodies the desire for the wheels to continue rotating endlessly as the town grows and opens up.	
Tōhoku			2 September 2005	A white flag with an emblem. The green earth, which represents the character "to" (と), and Lake Ogawara, which represents the character "u" (う), connected to the Pacific Ocean by the Takasegawa Floodway, represent the northeastern location, hope, and dynamism. The circle in the middle represents an image of harmony and the "monument of the center of Japan," signifying the richness of culture.	
Tsuruta			Emblem: 8 August 1956; Flag: 27 June 1997	A green flag with a white emblem. The upper half of the circle is a stylized katakana character "tsu" (ツ) and the lower half is a stylized "ru" (ル), symbolizing a crane.	
Yokohama			September 1970	A blue flag with an emblem. The emblem is a stylized version of the "yo" (よ) with large and small circles representing harmony, unity, and peace, and the tip of the "yo" (よ) representing limitless progress and development into the future.	
Yomogita			1 July 1980	A green flag with a white emblem. The emblem is a stylized version of the initial letter "yo" (ヨ), with three pointed lines, the bottom representing the past (ancestors), the middle representing the present, and the long line on top representing the future (youth), representing limitless development and the strength and harmony of a pine needle.	

=== Historical ===
Municipality	Flag	Emblem	Enactment Date Abolition Date	Description	Ref.
Fujisaki			1 August 1975 31 March 2005	A purple with a white emblem. The emblem consists of two wisteria flowers surrounding the katakana "fu" (フ). The katakana "fu" is a swan that flying over the hiragana "fu" (ふ) inside Mount Iwaki.	
Fukuchi			3 November 1968 1 January 2006	A maroon flag with an emblem. The emblem is a stylized H, the initial letter of Fukuchi Village, with the kanji character for "fu" (福) connecting the districts separated by the Mabechi River. The angle between the circle and the line is likened to the wings of a bird taking off, representing the image of a developing village.	
Goshogawara			1 July 1955 28 March 2005	A green flag with a yellow emblem. A stylized version of the number "go" (五) in the shape of a cross section of an apple.	
Hiraka			Unknown Emblem: 20 June 1964		
Hiraka			Emblem: 20 June 1964; Flag: 1 June 1977 1 January 2006	A red flag with a white emblem. The emblem is a horizontal arrangement of the character "Hiraka" (ヒラカ) that represents the Tsugaru Plain. It had a circular shape that surrounds the character.	
Inagaki			10 March 1976 11 February 2005	A white flags with a gold emblem. The outside is represented by a large circle, and the three circles in the middle represent "independence, harmony, and development," and are made up of the villagers living in the village.	
Ikarigaseki			Emblem: May 1967; Flag: 1 June 1987 1 January 2006		
Itayanagi			Unknown Emblem: 5 January 1965		
Iwaki			1 June 1959 27 February 2006		
Iwasaki			17 December 1971 31 March 2005		
Kamikita			Unknown 1 March 2005		
Kanagi			March 1955 28 March 2005		
Kanita			10 November 1970 28 March 2005		
Kashiwa			1 April 1973 11 February 2005		
Kawauchi			18 July 1967 14 March 2005		
Kidukuri			Unknown Emblem: 12 November 1980		
Kidukuri			Emblem: 12 November 1980; Flag: 1 June 1987 11 February 2005		
Kodomari			15 August 1963 28 March 2005		
Kuraishi			26 June 1965 1 July 2004		
Minmaya			1 October 1965 28 March 2005		
Momoishi			22 September 1964 1 March 2006		
Morita			8 October 1970 11 February 2005		
Nagawa			28 November 1965 1 January 2006		
Nakasato			21 August 1963 28 March 2005		
Namioka			March 1957 1 April 2005		
Nanbu			13 November 1965 1 January 2006		
Nangō			31 March 1967 31 March 2005		
Ōhata			Emblem: 1 November 1963; Flag: 1 May 1983 14 March 2005		
Onoe			March 1960 1 January 2006		
Sanbongi			1 February 1955 10 October 1956		
Shariki			30 June 1970 11 February 2005		
Shichinohe			1 October 1971 31 March 2005		
Shimoda			25 April 1937 1 March 2006		
Shiura			30 June 1965 28 March 2005		
Sōma			23 October 1968 27 February 2006		
Tairadate			1 April 1970 28 March 2005		
Tenmabayashi			16 September 1961 31 March 2005		
Tōhoku			14 September 1966 31 March 2005		
Tokiwa			3 May 1984 28 March 2005		
Towada			22 April 1958 1 January 2005		
Towadako			3 November 1965 1 January 2005		
Wakinosawa			22 December 1971 14 March 2005		

== Iwate Prefecture ==
=== Cities ===
Municipality	Flag	Emblem	Enactment Date	Description	Ref.
Hachimantai			1 September 2005	A white flag with an emblem. The sun shines brightly against a blue sky, based on the "hachi" (八) motif of Hachimantai. Beneath it are the city's three symbolic mountains (Mt. Iwate, Hachimantai, and Appi Highlands) and the fertile land spreading at their bases, representing the development of Hachimantai as a hub of exchange.	
Hanamaki			1 January 2006	A white flag with a white emblem. The emblem symbolizes the new city's vision for the future: "Ihatov Hanamaki, filled with peace and vitality, fragrant with the breeze of Hayachine." The four feather-shaped blue circles around the emblem represent the four cities and towns before the merger, the winds of Hayachine, and the development of the new city. The orange central circle represents the peace, vitality, and passion of the people who live there.	
Ichinoseki			15 November 2005	A white flag with an emblem. The emblem is based on the character "i" (い) from "Ichinoseki," symbolizing the city that is loved and familiar to the people and continues to develop. The blue represents the color of the Kitakami River, which flows through the center of the city, and its tributaries, while the green represents the color of the forests of the Ou Mountains and Kitakami mountain range, expressing the city's abundant nature.	
Kamaishi			Enactment: 5 May 1937; Reenactment: 1 April 1955	A blue flag with an emblem. The center if the emblem represents a kama or pot (釜), and the outline represents the sea breakwater and iron, symbolizing Kamaishi as a port and iron city, as well as the promotion and development of Kamaishi.	
Kitakami			11 July 1991	A white flag with a blue and green emblem. The emblem is based on the "kita" (北) of Kitakami, and dynamically expresses the city's desire for development surrounded by water and greenery.	
Kuji			6 March 2006		
Miyako			Enactment: 20 June 1942; Inheritance: 6 June 2006		
Morioka			Publication: 1889; Enactment: 13 April 1906; Flag: 3 November 1968		
Ninohe			1 January 2006		
Ōfunato			25 December 1952		
Ōshū			20 February 2006		
Rikuzentakata			1 June 1955		
Takizawa			25 October 1965		
Tōno			Enactment: February 1945; Reenactment: 4 February 1955; Inheritance: 1 June 2006		

=== Towns and villages ===
Municipality	Flag	Emblem	Enactment Date	Description	Ref.
Fudai			24 January 1964		
Hiraizumi			1 May 1965		
Hirono			1 January 2006		
Ichinohe			October 1958		
Iwaizumi			26 January 1966		
Iwate			1 June 1956		
Karumai			1 August 1957		
Kanegasaki			Enactment: 1955; Reenactment: 4 August 1971		
Kunohe			19 June 1964		
Kuzumaki			Publication: 4 November 1930; Enactment: 15 December 1978		
Kuzumaki			Publication: 4 November 1930; Enactment: 15 December 1978	Original emblem.	
Noda			1 July 1961		
Nishiwaga			1 November 2005		
Ōtsuchi			10 August 1960		
Shiwa			20 July 1955		
Shizukuishi			Enactment: September 1958; Reenactment: 1 April 1965		
Sumita			1 October 1956		
Tanohata			11 December 1965		
Yahaba			15 September 1957		
Yamada			2 November 1970		

=== Historical ===
Municipality	Flag	Emblem	Enactment Date Abolition Date	Description	Ref.
Ashiro			17 May 1960 1 September 2005		
Daitō			3 November 1959 20 September 2005		
Eduriko			22 December 1966 1 April 1991		
Esashi			7 June 1955 20 February 2006		
Fujisawa			16 November 1958 26 September 2011		
Fukuoka			October 1956 1 April 1972		
Hanaizumi			30 September 1961 20 September 2005		
Hanamaki			1 April 1954 1 January 2006		
Higashiyama			6 June 1963 20 September 2005		
Ichinoseki			29 July 1955 20 September 2005		
Isawa			1 April 1967 20 February 2006		
Ishidoriya			16 November 1958 1 January 2006		
Jōbōji			April 1961 1 January 2006		
Kawai			15 November 1964 1 January 2010		
Kawasaki			30 September 1961 20 September 2005		
Kitakami			20 May 1954 1 April 1991		
Koromogawa			31 December 1965 20 February 2006		
Kuji			6 December 1954 6 March 2006		
Maesawa			1 April 1957 20 February 2006		
Matsuo			1 November 1963 1 September 2005		
Miyamori			11 February 1955 1 October 2005		
Mizusawa			Emblem: 1 April 1954; Flag: December 1967 20 February 2006		
Murone			5 September 1958 20 September 2005		
Niisato			1 May 1961 6 June 2005		
Ninohe			1 November 1972 1 January 2006		
Nishine			1 November 1961 1 September 2005		
Ōhasama			1 April 1958 1 January 2006		
Ōno			Publication: July 1960; Enactment: 5 December 1977 1 January 2006		
Sanriku			4 October 1958 15 November 2001		
Sawauchi			1 November 1957 1 November 2005		
Senmaya			June 1960 20 September 2005		
Tamayama			Unknown 1 July 1974		
Tamayama			1 July 1974 10 January 2006		
Taneichi			1 February 1973 1 January 2006		
Tarō			15 May 1964 6 June 2005		
Tonan			2 June 1957 1 April 1992		
Tōwa			15 August 1959 1 January 2006		
Waga			3 January 1956 1 April 1991		
Yamagata			1 January 1961 6 March 2006		
Yuda			1 August 1964 1 November 2005		

== Miyagi Prefecture ==
=== Cities ===
Higashimatsushima

Ishinomaki

Iwanuma

Kakuda

Kesennuma

Kurihara

Natori

Ōsaki

Sendai

Shiogama

Shiroishi

Tagajō

Tome

Tomiya

=== Towns and villages ===
Kami

Kawasaki

Marumori

Matsushima

Minamisanriku

Misato

Murata

Ōgawara

Ōhira

Onagawa

Ōsato

Rifu

Shibata

Shichigahama

Shichikashuku

Shikama

Taiwa

Wakuya

Watari

Yamamoto

Zaō

== Akita Prefecture ==
=== Cities ===
Akita

Daisen

Katagami

Kazuno

Kitaakita

Nikaho

Noshiro

Ōdate

Oga

Semboku

Yokote

Yurihonjō

Yuzawa

=== Towns and villages ===
Fujisato

Gojome

Hachirōgata

Happo

Higashinaruse

Ikawa

Kosaka

Kamikoani

Mitane

Misato

Ōgata

Ugo

== Yamagata Prefecture ==
=== Cities ===
Higashine

Kaminoyama

Murayama

Nagai

Nan'yō

Obanazawa

Sagae

Sakata

Shinjo

Tendo

Tsuruoka

Yamagata

Yonezawa

=== Towns and villages ===
Asahi

Funagata

Iide

Kahoku

Kaneyama

Kawanishi

Mamurogawa

Mikawa

Mogami

Nakayama

Nishikawa

Ōe

Oguni

Oishida

Ōkura

Sakegawa

Shirataka

Shonai

Takahata

Tozawa

Yamanobe

Yuza

== Fukushima Prefecture ==
=== Cities ===
Aizuwakamatsu

Date

Fukushima

Iwaki

Kitakata

Kōriyama

Minamisōma

Motomiya

Nihonmatsu

Shirakawa

Sōma

Sukagawa

Tamura

=== Towns and villages ===
Aizubange

Aizumisato

Asakawa

Bandai

Furudono

Futaba

Hanawa

Hinoemata

Hirata

Hirono

Inawashiro

Iitate

Izumizaki

Kagamiishi

Katsurao

Kawamata

Kawauchi

Kaneyama

Kitashiobara

Koori

Kunimi

Miharu

Minamiaizu

Mishima

Nakajima

Namie

Naraha

Nishiaizu

Nishigo

Okuma

Ono

Otama

Samegawa

Shimogo

Shinchi

Shōwa

Tadami

Tamakawa

Tanagura

Ten'ei

Tomioka

Yabuki

Yamatsuri

Yanaizu

Yugawa

=== Historical ===
Aizutakada (1965–2005)

Nakoso

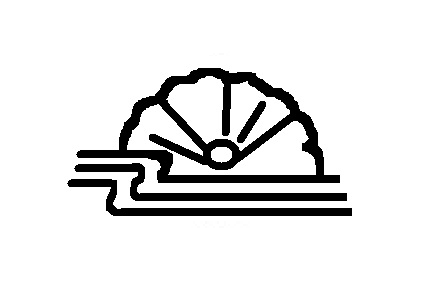
Sukagawa

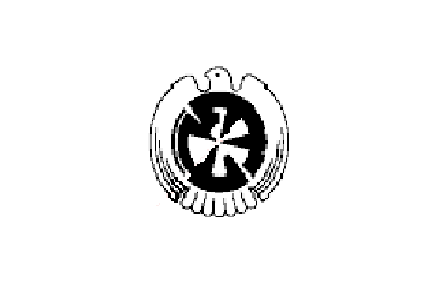
Tanagura (1955–1973)
