= List of municipal flags of Kansai region =

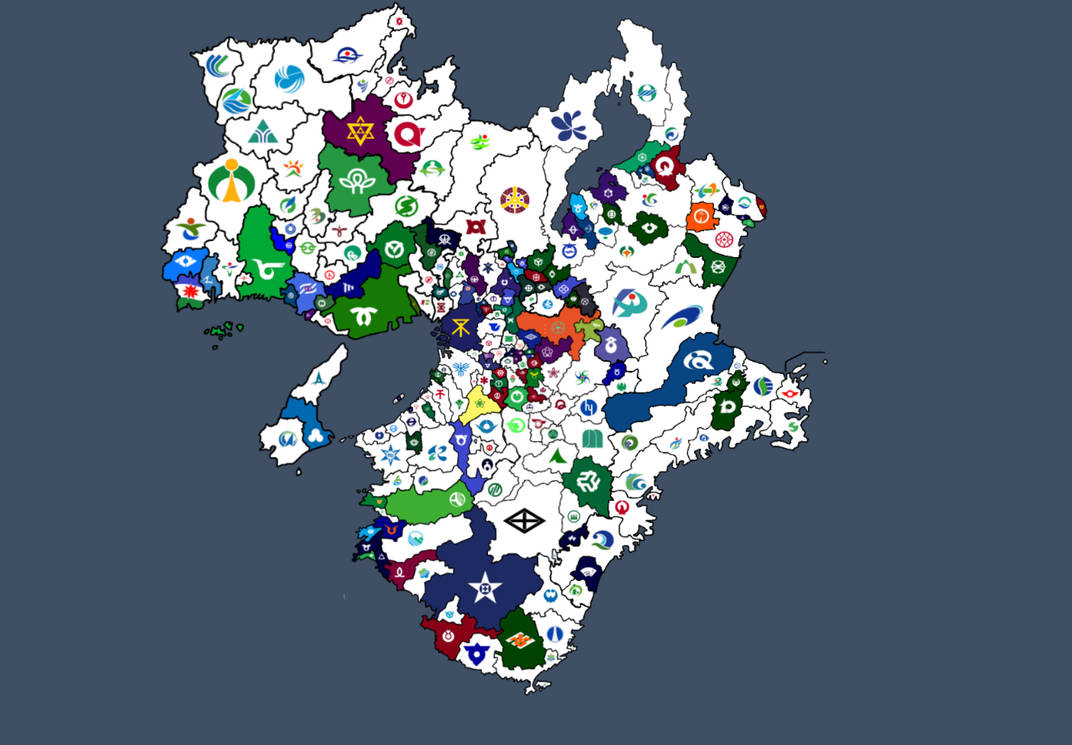
Flags of municipalities of Kansai region

This page lists the municipal flags of Kansai region, Japan. It is a part of the List of Japanese municipal flags, which is split into regions due to its size.

== Complete lists of Japanese municipal flags pages ==
The regions of Japan. From northeast to southwest: Hokkaidō (red), Tōhoku (yellow), Kantō (green), Chūbu (cyan), Kansai (violet), Chūgoku (orange), Shikoku (purple), and Kyūshū & Okinawa (grey).

- List of municipal flags of Hokkaidō
- List of municipal flags of Tōhoku region
- List of municipal flags of Kantō region
- List of municipal flags of Chūbu region
- List of municipal flags of Kansai region
- List of municipal flags of Chūgoku region
- List of municipal flags of Shikoku
- List of municipal flags of Kyūshū

== Mie Prefecture ==
=== Cities ===
Iga

Inabe

Ise

Kameyama

Kumano

Kuwana

Matsusaka

Nabari

Owase

Shima

Suzuka

Toba

Tsu

Yokkaichi

=== Towns ===
Asahi

Kawagoe

Kihō

Kihoku

Kisosaki

Komono

Meiwa

Mihama

Minamiise

Ōdai

Taiki

Taki

Tamaki

Tōin

Watarai

== Shiga Prefecture ==
=== Cities ===
Higashiōmi

Hikone

Kōka

Konan

Kusatsu

Maibara

Moriyama

Nagahama

Ōtsu

Ōmihachiman

Rittō

Takashima

Yasu

=== Towns ===
Aishō

Hino

Kōra

Ryūō

Taga

Toyosato

== Kyoto Prefecture ==
=== Cities ===
Ayabe

Fukuchiyama

Jōyō

Kameoka

Kizugawa

Kyōtanabe

Kyōtango

Kyoto

Maizuru

Miyazu

Mukō

Nagaokakyō

Nantan

Uji

Yawata

=== Towns and villages ===
Ide

Ine

Kasagi

Kumiyama

Kyōtamba

Minamiyamashiro

Ōyamazaki

Seika

Ujitawara

Wazuka

Yosano

== Osaka Prefecture ==
=== Cities ===
Daitō

Fujiidera

Habikino

Hannan

Higashiōsaka

Hirakata

Ibaraki

Ikeda

Izumi

Izumiotsu

Izumisano

Kadoma

Kaizuka

Kashiwara

Katano

Kawachinagano

Kishiwada

Matsubara

Minoh

Moriguchi

Neyagawa

Osaka

Osakasayama

Sakai

Sennan

Settsu

Shijōnawate

Suita

Takaishi

Takatsuki

Tondabayashi

Toyonaka

Yao

=== Towns and villages ===
Chihayaakasaka

Kanan

Kumatori

Misaki

Nose

Shimamoto

Tadaoka

Taishi

Tajiri

Toyono

== Hyōgo Prefecture ==
=== Cities ===
Aioi

Akashi

Akō

Amagasaki

Asago

Ashiya

Awaji

Himeji

Itami

Kakogawa

Kasai

Katō

Kawanishi

Kobe

Miki

Minamiawaji

Nishinomiya

Nishiwaki

Ono

Sanda

Tanba-Sasayama

Shisō

Sumoto

Takarazuka

Takasago

Tanba

Tatsuno

Toyooka

Yabu

=== Towns ===
Fukusaki

Harima

Ichikawa

Inagawa

Inami

Kami

Kamigōri

Kamikawa

Sayō

Shin'onsen

Taishi

Taka

== Nara Prefecture ==
=== Cities ===
Gojō

Gose

Ikoma

Kashiba

Kashihara

Katsuragi

Nara

Sakurai

Tenri

Uda

Yamatokōriyama

Yamatotakada

=== Towns and villages ===
Ando

Asuka

Heguri

Higashiyoshino

Ikaruga

Kamikitayama

Kanmaki

Kawai

Kawakami

Kawanishi

Kōryō

Kurotaki

Mitsue

Miyake

Nosegawa

Ōji

Ōyodo

Sangō

Shimoichi

Shimokitayama

Soni

Takatori

Tawaramoto

Tenkawa

Totsukawa

Yamazoe

Yoshino

== Wakayama Prefecture ==
=== Cities ===
Arida

Gobō

Hashimoto

Iwade

Kainan

Kinokawa

Shingū

Tanabe

Wakayama

=== Towns and villages ===
Aridagawa

Hidaka

Hidakagawa

Hirogawa

Inami

Kamitonda

Katsuragi

Kimino

Kitayama

Kōya

Kozagawa

Kudoyama

Kushimoto

Mihama

Minabe

Nachikatsuura

Shirahama

Susami

Taiji

Yuasa

Yura
