= List of municipal flags of Hokkaidō =

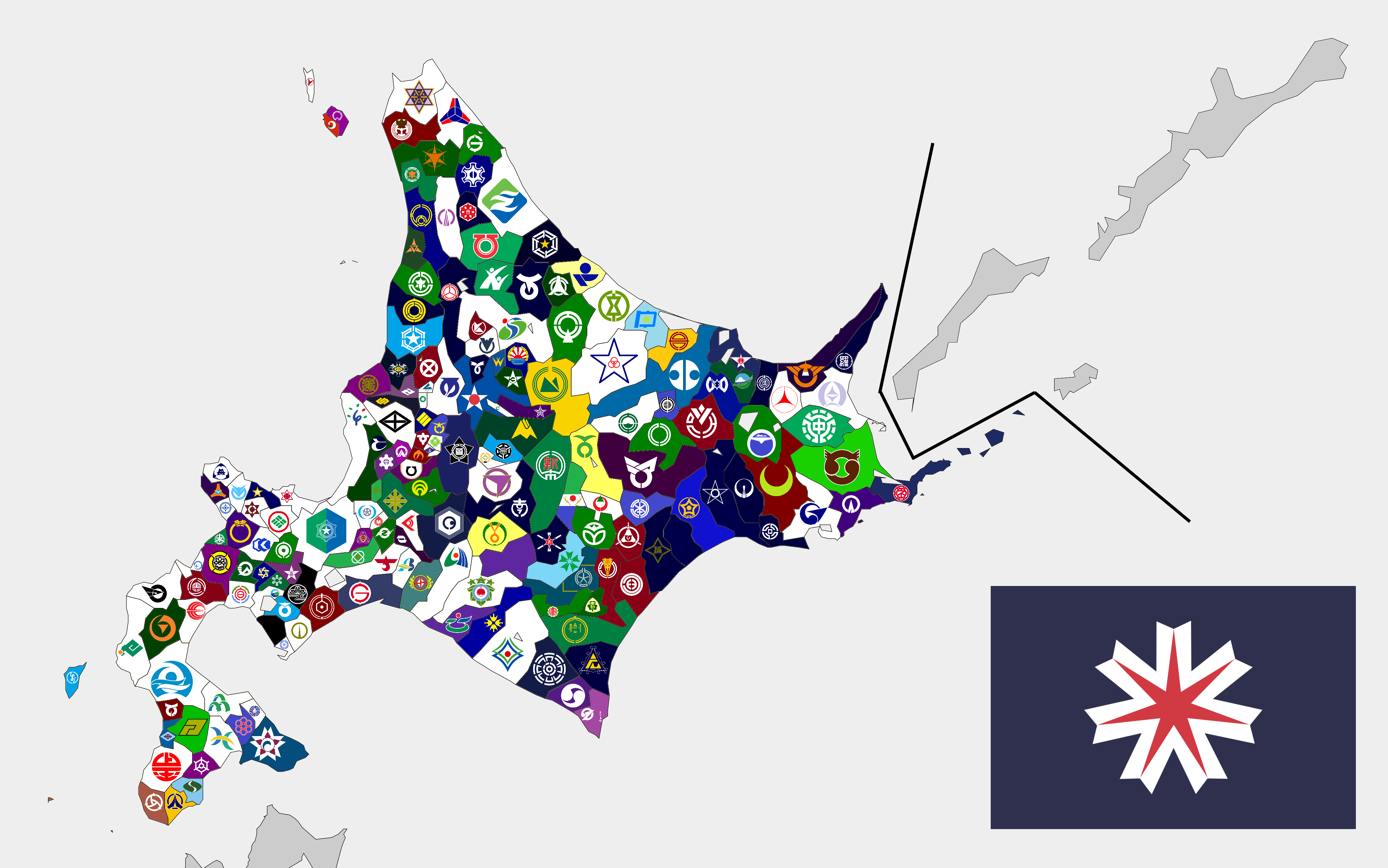
Flags of municipalities of Hokkaidō

This page lists the municipal flags of Hokkaidō, Japan. It is a part of the Lists of Japanese municipal flags, which is split into regions because of its size.

== Complete lists of Japanese municipal flags pages ==
The regions of Japan. From northeast to southwest: Hokkaidō (red), Tōhoku (yellow), Kantō (green), Chūbu (cyan), Kansai (violet), Chūgoku (orange), Shikoku (purple), and Kyūshū & Okinawa (grey).

- List of municipal flags of Hokkaidō
- List of municipal flags of Tōhoku region
- List of municipal flags of Kantō region
- List of municipal flags of Chūbu region
- List of municipal flags of Kansai region
- List of municipal flags of Chūgoku region
- List of municipal flags of Shikoku
- List of municipal flags of Kyūshū

== Hidaka Subprefecture ==
=== Towns ===
| Municipality | Flag | Emblem | Enactment Date | Description | Ref. |
|---|---|---|---|---|---|
| Biratori | | | 1 July 1949 | A white flag with an emblem. The emblem consists of a blue stylized "bira" (平), a Japanese gentian which is the mon of the local shrine, the Yoshitsune shrine and three petals representing wisdom, heartedness and bravery. It also contains a white pigeon, a red sun and a red Polaris star to symbolize the surge of peace. | |
| Erimo | | | Emblem: 14 July 1970; Flag: 1 April 1959 | A blue flag with a white stylized "e" (え). The circle represents fishery and the arrow represents dairy and meat industry. Together, it represents the concord and solidarity of the town. However, the emblem was adopted on 14 July 1970. | |
| Hidaka | | | 1 March 2006 | A purple flag with a white stylized "hi" (ひ). Red represents the sun and the smiles. Green and blue represents the former two towns (Biratori and Monbetsu) that were merged into Hidaka. | |
| Hidaka | | | 1 March 2006 | Fringed variant. | |
| Niikappu | | | 21 March 1968 | A marine blue flag with an orange emblem. The emblem consists of a shovel (representing the pioneers of the town), a horseshoe (representing ranches around the town), an anchor (representing fishery) and a crown (representing renewal). Together, it represents peace and solidarity for the citizens and the future for the town. Marine blue represents the grassland and the Pacific Ocean. Orange represents bark trees. The colours are said to be worn by the pioneers. | |
| Samani | | | 1 April 1918 | A purple flag with a white emblem. Inspired by Cape Enrumu, the two swirls had the concept of double. It represents two ports (the larger eastern port and the small western port), fishing and agriculture (such as forestry) and peace and collaboration. | |
| Shinhidaka | | | 14 July 2006 | A white flag with a stylized "hi" (ひ). The blue diamond represents Hokkaido, green represents Shinhidaka and the red circle represents its citizens. | |
| Urakawa | | | 26 June 1967 | A blue flag with a stylized "ura" (ウラ) repeated four times and a "kawa" (河) in the centre. It was first used at the groundbreaking ceremony for Urakawa Fishing Port in 1921. | |

=== Historical ===
| Municipality | Flag | Emblem | Enactment Date Abolition Date | Description | Ref. |
|---|---|---|---|---|---|
| Hidaka | | | 1 July 1955 1 March 2006 | A purple flag with a yellow emblem. The emblem represents a hawk that flaps its wings against the sun (hi; 日). | |
| Horoizumi | | | 1 January 1959 14 April 1970 | A white flag with a blue emblem. The emblem is the town's name in stylized kanji (幌泉). | |
| Mitsuishi | | | 3 November 1951 14 July 2006 | A white flag with a stylized "ishi" (石). The three parts of the emblem symbolize harmony of the town through industry such as agriculture, forestry, fisheries and commerce. | |
| Monbetsu | | | 22 December 1967 1 March 2006 | A red flag with a stylized "mon" (門) in a form of a star. The emblem was designed to represent its citizen's pioneer ancestry and future. The inner circle represents the industrial development. The six points of the start represents the characteristics and prosperity of the town. | |
| Shizunai | | | 9 September 1950 14 July 2006 | A green flag with a red emblem composed of four "tsu" (ツ) as it sound like "shizu" (静) and two "nai" (内) are placed upside down. The space in the middle of the emblem represents development above and below ground. The seven circles represent cooperation. | |

== Hiyama Subprefecture ==
=== Towns ===
| Municipality | Flag | Emblem | Enactment Date | Description | Ref. |
|---|---|---|---|---|---|
| Assabu | | | 30 March 1968 | A green flag with a yellow and dark green "a" (ア). The emblem was inspired by the paddy fields surrounds the town with yellow representing rice. | |
| Esashi | | | 1916 | A blue flag with a white "e" (エ) stylized in a diamond to represent infinite development, and the four red "sa" (サ) are arranged in a circle represents peace and unity of the town. It was readopted in 1955 after it became a town. | |
| Imakane | | | 22 December 1967 | A green flag with a white "no" (ノ) representing the combination mountains and rivers and agriculture with development of the breadbasket and the dairy industry. The triangle represents utopia of the ancestors of the pioneers and the circle represents the development of the river's basin, harmony and cooperation. | |
| Kaminokuni | | | Emblem: 1927; Flag: 6 June 1968 | A white flag with the word "Kamikuni" (上国) in a red circular form to represent peace. Red represents strength and health and white represents peace and development. | |
| Okushiri | | | 1 January 1966 | A light blue flag with a white emblem. The emblem is the town's name in stylized hiragana (おくしり). It represents world peace and solidarity. The emblem is also represents unification of the development of the island and the hearts of its citizens. | |
| Otobe | | | Publication: 18 August 1965; Enactment: 5 December 1965 | A maroon flag with a white emblem that is a combination of "oto" (乙) "be" (べ). The centre represents Mount Otobe and the two commas represent the Sea of Japan. The emblem is also shaped like a kobukuro (a bag for putting gold) representing wealth. | |
| Setana | | | Publication: 1 September 2005; Enactment: 15 November 2005 | A white flag with a green and orange emblem. The green "se" (セ) represents Hokkaido and the orange circle represents the location of the town. Green represents nature and orange represents communication. | |

=== Historical ===
| Municipality | Flag | Emblem | Enactment Date Abolition Date | Description | Ref. |
|---|---|---|---|---|---|
| Kitahiyama | | | 3 November 1965 1 September 2005 | A blue flag with a red emblem. The "kita" (北) represents the relations between pioneers and mountains of filled with cypress. If the emblem is right side is up, it becomes "ki" (き). However, if the emblem is left side is up, it means "ta" (た). | |
| Okushiri | | | 1906 1 January 1966 | A blue flag with a white stylized "oku" (奥). | |
| Setana | | | 1 May 1968 15 November 2005 | A maroon flag with a blue emblem. The emblem represents development and hope. The blue represents the fishing industry and its relations to the Sea of Japan. Maroon is believed to be the color of pioneer ancestors of the town's citizens. | |
| Taisei | | | 20 July 1955 1 September 2005 | A light blue flag with a white emblem. The emblem is the town's name in stylized kanji (大成). | |

== Iburi Subprefecture ==
=== Cities ===
| Municipality | Flag | Emblem | Enactment Date | Description | Ref. |
|---|---|---|---|---|---|
| Date | | | 25 May 1977 | A blue flag with a white emblem. The sakura represents samurai, the stream represent rivers and the ring represents peace. The emblem together represents overcoming obstacles. | |
| Muroran | | | 13 April 1936 | A blue flag with a blue emblem. The emblem consists of six "ro" (ロ) encircling the orchid representing the grasping of the earth. | |
| Noboribetsu | | | 1 October 1961 | A blue flag with a yellow "no" (の). The triangle represents surge and the inner circle represents industry and tourism. Together, it represents the future. | |
| Tomakomai | | | Emblem: 22 August 1949; Flag: 26 July 1968 | A blue flag has a white and red emblem. The emblem contains a red "toma" (トマ) on the top and the bottom. The "koma" (コマ) is designed as two protrusions at the top and the bottom. The "to" (ト) can be read as "i" (イ). The flag was inspired by a koma, a Japanese spinning top. | |

=== Towns ===
| Municipality | Flag | Emblem | Enactment Date | Description | Ref. |
|---|---|---|---|---|---|
| Abira | | | 27 March 2006 | A white flag with the emblem. The emblem is a stylized combination of the letters "A" and "B". Inspired by breeze of wind and nature, it represents the depicts the Abira river and the hills surrounding the town. | |
| Abira | | | 27 March 2006 | A flag of a variant of Abira. | |
| Atsuma | | | Emblem: 25 December 1954; Flag: 26 March 1968 | Blue flag variant with a red and a white emblem surrounded by two yellow rice stalks. The emblem is the town's name in stylized katakana (アツマ). White represents the future and concord, the red for a spirit, green for forests, plains, the Pacific Ocean and yellow for rice. | |
| Mukawa | | | 27 March 2006 | A white flag with a stylized "mu" (ム). The green curve represents of forests and its products, and three blue curves represents clear stream, the Pacific Ocean, and sky. The red circle represents health, harmony and vitality. Together, it represents strength and nature and the coexistence of nature and the town's inhabitants. | |
| Shiraoi | | | Publication: 5 September 1955; Enactment: 24 September 1968; Reenactment: 1 October 1984 | A maroon flag with a white stylized "shira" (白) and "oi" (オイ). The circles represents solidarity, the hexagon represents development. The upper part represents prosperity. | |
| Shiraoi | | | Publication: 5 September 1955; Enactment: 24 September 1968; Reenactment: 1 October 1984 | Alternate blue version. | |
| Shiraoi | | | Publication: 5 September 1955; Enactment: 24 September 1968; Reenactment: 1 October 1984 | Alternate green version. | |
| Sōbetsu | | | 30 June 1958 | A blue flag with a white stylized "so" (そ). The upper part represents the breakthroughs by Mount Usu and Mount Showa while the lower part represents peace by Lake Tōya. | |
| Tōyako | | | 27 March 2006 | A white flag with a stylized "to" (と). It represents Mount Tōya, the sky, the landscape and the energy of the town. | |
| Toyoura | | | 1 July 1947 | A white flag with four (representing "yo") stylized "to" (ト) with two green "to" on the top and two blue "to" on the bottom and a red stylized "ura" (ウラ) in the centre. It represents affinity and cooperation. | |

=== Historical ===
| Municipality | Flag | Emblem | Enactment Date Abolition Date | Description | Ref. |
|---|---|---|---|---|---|
| Abuta | | | 1 September 1962 27 March 2006 | A maroon flag with a white emblem. The emblem is a combination of the Latin alphabet "A" and "a" (ア). The circle represents the many eruptions and Lake Tōya. The central triangle represents mountains while the inverted triangle represents Lake Tōya. Together, it represents mining. | |
| Hayakita | | | 10 October 1961 27 March 2006 | A blue flag with a white stylized "haya" (ハヤ). It represents future with strength, harmony and unity. | |
| Hobetsu | | | 18 June 1962 27 March 2006 | A purple flag with a white stylized "ho" (ホ). The "Y" represents the exchange between the Mu and Hobetsu Rivers and the triangle represents the surrounding mountains. | |
| Muroran | | | 1922 13 April 1936 | A white flag with a black stylized "muro" (室). | |
| Mukawa | | | 1 January 1960 27 March 2006 | A green flag with an emblem that is a combination of a stylized "kawa" (川) and a stylized "kome" (米). White represents peace amongst the town's citizens, and the thickness of the yellow line represents strong unity. | |
| Oiwake | | | 20 July 1958 27 March 2006 | A light blue flag with a white emblem. The emblem is the town's name in stylized kanji (追分). It represents affinity. It is also shaped like a wheel of a locomotive to represent great construction. | |
| Ōtaki | | | 1 September 1965 1 March 2006 | A white flag with a styled red "wa" (和) to symbolize Japan and three grey lines represent agriculture, tourism, and welfare. | |
| Tōya | | | 16 April 1968 27 March 2006 | A blue flag with six styled white "to" (ト). It is shaped like a wheel of a farming machine and the sun to represent future development. The circles represents Lake Tōya. | |

== Ishikari Subprefecture ==
=== Cities ===
| Municipality | Flag | Emblem | Enactment Date | Description | Ref. |
|---|---|---|---|---|---|
| Chitose | | | 1 May 1952 | A white flag with a red stylized "chi" (ち). The "chi" of an airplane to represent the city's reputation as an aerial city. It also represents Mount Tarumae, Lake Shikotsu and Osatsu Plain. | |
| Ebetsu | | | Emblem: 24 October 1924; Flag: 25 May 1968 | A white flag with five blue stylized "e" (エ) and a star. The star represent ancestors and five stylized "e" (エ) represents descendants. The circle represents an infinite future. Light blue represents the Ishikari River and the sky. White represents snow and cleanliness. Navy blue represents traditions handed down by ancestors. | |
| Eniwa | | | 1 September 1961 | A green flag with a yellow stylized "e" (恵) E of Eniwa and two white stylized "wa" (庭). The two "wa" represents the Izarigawa and Shimamatsu rivers. When combined, they represent two streams. | |
| Ishikari | | | 23 February 1996 | A white flag with a stylized "i". The letter "i" represents the growing future. It also represents trees, flowers, the sun, the Ishikari River and expansion. | |
| Kitahiroshima | | | 20 October 1969 | A purple flag with a stylized "hi" (ひ). The wave patterns and a triangle represents development. | |
| Sapporo | | | Emblem: August 1911; Flag: 3 November 1964 | A white flag with a green-blue emblem. The emblem illuminates a snowflake and the six sides symbolizes the six pledges of the citizen's charter. Green means forests and crops. Blue symbolizes sky and the world. White represents snow. The emblem contains a "sa" (札), a "ro" (ロ) and a "ho" (ホ) shaped like the Polaris to represent will. | |

=== Wards ===
| Municipality | Flag | Emblem | Enactment Date | Description | Ref. |
|---|---|---|---|---|---|
| Atsubetsu | | | February 1990 | A white flag with a blue-green stylized "A". The letter represents the na. The pyramid represents the shape of the area and the two rivers. The three lines represents vitality. The bird represents the development, Publication and leap toward the future. Blue-green represents freshness and greenery. | |
| Chūō | | | April 1975 | A white flag with a green and orange emblem. The green curve represents greenery and the ward's inhabitants. the orange cross represents development and vitality. White represents cleanness. | |
| Higashi | | | July 1977 | A white flag with a green and white emblem. The emblem is the ward's name in stylized kanji (東). The white in green represents nature. The six circles represents snowflakes. Together, it represents future development and relations with other wards of Sapporo. | |
| Kita | | | March 1977 | A white flag with a green and red emblem. The emblem is the ward's name in stylized kanji (北). It represents its location at the north. The left figure symbolizes poplar trees and the central symbol for development. Green represents tree and youth. The star represents Sapporo and red represents solidarity. | |
| Kiyota | | | November 1997 | A white flag with a stylized "k". Orange is a thick trunk that symbolizes richness, stability and harmony, Green is a thick leaf that stands for future and blue is a river that develops nature. | |
| Minami | | | 1977 | A white flag with a green emblem. The emblem is the ward's name in stylized kanji (南). It represents greenery and birds. | |
| Nishi | | | July 1976 | A white flag with a green triangle with a stylized white "w" (representing the English translation of the ward's name). The triangle symbolizes Mount Teine and development. Green represents nature. White is shaped like two birds to represent harmony and cooperation. | |
| Shiroishi | | | August 1977 | A white flag with an emblem. The emblem consists of a blue sky, a parent holding a child and a tree. They represent humanity. | |
| Teine | | | March 1990 | A white flag with an emblem. The triangle symbolizes Mount Teine and the future. The curve represents the Karugawa River, cooperation, solidarity of humanity. The colours express nature such as trees, bodies of water and the sky. | |
| Toyohira | | | September 1977 | A white flag with a stylized "to" (と) and is shaped like an apple (the fruit of the ward). The blue "to" symbolizes the Toyohira River and the sky, and the green "to" and the leaves represents natural beauty. | |

=== Towns and villages ===
| Municipality | Flag | Emblem | Enactment Date | Description | Ref. |
|---|---|---|---|---|---|
| Shinshinotsu | | | 4 January 1934 | A green flag with a yellow emblem. The lower three lines represents the Ishikari River, the upper one symbolizes the Shinotsu River. Green represents agriculture. | |
| Tōbetsu | | | Publication: 28 April 1969; Enactment: 9 May 1970 | A green flag with a stylized "to" (と). It represents young generations. The circle symbolizes the sun, nature and harmony. | |

=== Historical ===
| Municipality | Flag | Emblem | Enactment Date Abolition Date | Description | Ref. |
|---|---|---|---|---|---|
| Atsuta | | | October 1963 1 October 2005 | A maroon flag with a white emblem. The emblem is the village's name in stylized katakana (アツタ). The circle represents is wishes for the fusion of all the villagers, and the triangle represents movements. It is a symbol of. | |
| Hamamasu | | | 28 May 1968 1 October 2005 | A blue flag with a white stylized "hana" (ハマ). The emblem expresses peace and unity. The four tips shows outward development. The line represents the sensible villagers. | |
| Hiroshima | | | April 1934 20 October 1969 | A white flag with a sun and a river. | |
| Ishikari | | | Enactment: 1920; Reenactment: 1 April 1927 23 February 1996 | A yellow flag with a red and white emblem. The emblem combination of four "i" (イ) to form "ishi" (イシ), the right side of the circle is transformed from "ka" (カ), and the left side is "ri" (リ). | |
| Teine | | | 1961 1 March 1967 | A white flag with a black "te" (て). | |

== Kamikawa Subprefecture ==
=== Cities ===
| Municipality | Flag | Emblem | Enactment Date | Description | Ref. |
|---|---|---|---|---|---|
| Asahikawa | | | Emblem: 29 June 1911; Flag: 18 September 1970 | A blue flag with a white Polaris star and a red dot. The Polaris represents Hokkaido. The Polaris also represents hardship and Blue represents will, culture and nature. White represents winter. Red represent spirituality through the frontiers. | |
| Furano | | | 15 October 1966 | A white flag with a blue stylized "fu" (フ). The three part of the outer ring symbolizes Furano, Yamabe, and Higashiyama. The acute angle and ridgeline of the "fu" depicts mountains to represents heroism and the circle symbolizes peace and harmony. | |
| Nayoro | | | 27 March 2006 | A white flag with a green stylized "N". It represents Nayoro and Fūren. Green represents nature. Designed by Yuko Sasaki. | |
| Shibetsu | | | 14 October 2005 | A white flag with an emblem. The emblem expresses the relations between the city and nature. Green represents earth and the two entities (Shibetsu and Asahi) that merged into one. The blue "S" represents the Teshio River. The red circle represents speed. | |
| Shibetsu | | | 14 October 2005 | Fringed variant. | |

=== Towns and villages ===
| Municipality | Flag | Emblem | Enactment Date | Description | Ref. |
|---|---|---|---|---|---|
| Aibetsu | | | 6 November 1934 | A blue flag with an emblem. The emblem contains a rising sun symbolizing development (though it may represent the (Order of the Rising Sun) and the two arrows and a river represents an Ainu saying (yagawa; "the river is fast like an arrow"). | |
| Biei | | | Emblem: 25 February 1963; Flag: 11 August 1969 | A green flag with a yellow stylized "bi" (び) to represent Mount Tokachi. It also represents the affinity. Green represents peace through healthy means. Yellow represents honor overcoming fatness. | |
| Bifuka | | | 1 April 1948 | A green flag with a white and red stylized "bi" (び). The thick line on the outside represents men while the thin line on the inside represents women. Together, they represent development and unity of harmony. | |
| Higashikagura | | | 1 January 1993 | A white flag with a green stylized "hi" (ヒ). It represents the earth's infinite sacredness. Green symbolizes harmony amongst nature and people. White represents holiness. | |
| Higashikagura | | | 1 January 1993 | Fringed variant. | |
| Higashikawa | | | Emblem: July 1934; Flag: 1 August 1968 | A purple flag with a white Polaris to represent Hokkaido. The white stylized "higashi" (東) with a dot represents Mount Asahi. The three-line circle is a white stylized "kawa" (川) represents the Chubetsu and Kuranuma rivers. Purple represents Mount Daisetsu and the forests surrounding it. White symbolizes the spirit of its citizens. Together, it expresses the future. | |
| Horokanai | | | 3 July 1958 | A blue flag with a white and red emblem. The emblem is the town's name in stylized katakana (ホロカナイ). The circle resembles a yen coin. The three bars represents harmony of heaven and earth. The great and little circles represent the Uryu river and Lake Shumarinai as well as development and tourism. The three small circles stands for politics, economy, and education. The three fans in the small circle represent forests, farmland and mines. They also represent livestock, commerce and industry as well as other industries. | |
| Kamifurano | | | 5 October 1957 | A green flag with a white and red emblem. Three "ka" (力) surround the "tomi" (富) to form "Kamifu" (かみふ). The three "ka" represents cooperation while the "tomi" represents wealth. | |
| Kamikawa | | | 29 July 1955 | A yellow flag with a green emblem. The emblem is the town's name in stylized kanji (上川). The "kami" represents the Daisetsuzan Volcanic Group, while the "kawa" represents the Ishikari River as well as goodness. | |
| Kenbuchi | | | 20 June 1968 | A maroon flag with a white "K". The triangles represents the location and the stability of town. It also represents Mount Hiranami, development and future. The double rings represents unity, cooperation and harmony. | |
| Minamifurano | | | March 1967 | A purple flag with a white emblem. The emblem is a combination of "fu" (フ) and "minami" (南). The round-like shape of the emblem represents the Kanayama Dam and development. | |
| Nakafurano | | | Enactment: 1 April 1962; Inheritance: 24 March 1967 | A white flag with an emblem. The emblem consists of a "naka" (中). Yellow represents rice and black represents the wealth of the town being blessed by Mount Fuji. | |
| Nakagawa | | | 1 May 1964 | A blue flag with a white emblem. The emblem is the town's name in stylized kanji (中川). The outer circle symbolizes peace and the centre acute angle represents the development. | |
| Otoineppu | | | 27 June 1965 | A blue flag with a red and white emblem. The emblem is akin to a snowflake. The "oto" (音) in a red circle represents the sun. The six pentagons represents silos and dairy farming. | |
| Pippu | | | Enactment: 17 July 1954; Specification: 1 June 2005 | A blue flag with a yellow stylized "pi" (比). A design of the "ratio" of Pippu Town, the two intersections represents harmony and unity, the bulge at the bottom indicates richness and the four hands represents development. | |
| Shimokawa | | | 25 December 1958 | A purple flag with a white stylized "shimo" (下). It represents breakthrough for future, industry, culture and harmonious love. It also resembles a human person. | |
| Shimukappu | | | 11 October 1963 | A yellow flag with a stylized "shimu" (占). The emblem represents togetherness. Green represents mountains and orange represents villagers. | |
| Takasu | | | 1 January 1968 | A blue flag with a white emblem. The emblem resembles a hawk. It represents the importance of rice to the town's citizens and future. | |
| Tōma | | | 1 April 1968 | A green flag with a white stylized "to" (当) in a form of the Polaris. The Polaris represents the pioneers while the circle represents harmony and unity. | |
| Wassamu | | | 24 August 1965 | A white flag with a blue stylized "W". The circle represents cooperation. The triangle represents agriculture. | |

=== Historical ===
| Municipality | Flag | Emblem | Enactment Date Abolition Date | Description | Ref. |
|---|---|---|---|---|---|
| Asahi | | | 23 August 1962 1 September 2005 | A blue flag with the town's name in stylized katakana (アサヒ) to represent peace and forests. White stands for agriculture. The circular shape represents harmonious cooperation. | |
| Fūren | | | 1 April 1940 27 March 2006 | A blue flag with a white stylized "fū" (風) and a white stylized "ren" (連). The outer circle represents the four winds and rice. The cross resembles a hoe to represent labor and hard work. The small white circle represents harmony. The emblem was designed by Eiji Yamatani. | |
| Furano | | | December 1932 1 May 1966 | A white flag with a black stylized "fu" (富) inside a flower. The flag was retired along with the town when it was merged with Yamabe. | |
| Higashikagura | | | 31 August 1953 1 January 1993 | A green flag with a red stylized "higa" (東). Yellow represents comfort and red represents the sun. | |
| Higashitakasu | | | 28 September 1934 3 March 1971 | A white flag with a hawk carrying a black stylized "higa" (東). | |
| Kagura | | | 1 November 1954 3 March 1968 | A white flag with a grey emblem. | |
| Nayoro | | | 1 April 1956 27 March 2006 | A green flag with four white stylized "na" (ナ) to represent unity, harmony and development. | |
| Nagayama | | | 1 November 1954 1 April 1961 | A white flag with a yellow Polaris star containing the town's name. | |
| Shibetsu | | | 3 September 1954 1 September 2005 | A blue flag with a white and red emblem. The outer shape made represents the unity between the four towns and villagers. It also represents the universalization, equality and development. The inner shape represents birth. It also resembles a bird to represent future. Dark blue ground represents heaven and earth. Red represents spiritual love. The light beam represents the infinite development. White represents freshness and justice. | |
| Yamabe | | | 1935 15 July 1965 | A white flag with an emblem. The flag was retired when the village was promoted to town status. | |
| Yamabe | | | 15 July 1965 1 May 1966 | A white flag with a blue stylized "yama" (山). The flag was retired along with the town when it was merged with Furano. | |

== Kushiro Subprefecture ==
=== Cities ===
| Municipality | Flag | Emblem | Enactment Date | Description | Ref. |
|---|---|---|---|---|---|
| Kushiro | | | 23 August 1920 | A blue flag a white Polaris (representing Hokkaido) and a circle (representing Kushiro). The emblem represents prosperity. | |

=== Towns and villages ===
| Municipality | Flag | Emblem | Enactment Date | Description | Ref. |
|---|---|---|---|---|---|
| Akkeshi | | | 1 June 1964 | A white flag a blue stylized "a" (ア). The circle represents harmony and cooperation. The triangle stands for the future. The three circles respectively symbolizes agriculture, forestry and fisheries, and commerce. It also represents the Akkeshi Bay. | |
| Hamanaka | | | 3 November 1963 | A purple flag a white stylized "hama" (ハマ). It represents the Hamanaka and Biwase Bays as well as agriculture and fishing. The triangle represents harmonious development through the heavens. | |
| Kushiro | | | 3 September 1959 | A purple flag with four white stylized "ku" (ク) and a white stylized "ro" (ロ). It is shaped like a coin to represent wealth. | |
| Shibecha | | | 1 June 1968 | A maroon flag a yellowish green crescent which is actually a stylized "shi" (し). Yellow green represents rich soil. The "shi" also represents expansionism, creativity, harmony and development. | |
| Shiranuka | | | 11 November 1950 | A blue flag a yellow stylized "shira" (白) and a yellow stylized "nuka" (ヌカ). The circle symbolizes peace and solidarity while the star represents the five industries of the town. | |
| Teshikaga | | | 1 April 1961 | A light green flag a white stylized "te" (テ). The three mountains represent Mount Mashu and the "te" represents infinite leap. Blue represents Lake Mashu. The non-concentric circle represents harmony. | |
| Tsurui | | | 1 September 1949 | A blue flag a white emblem. The emblem resembles a Red-crowned crane. The wings represent development, peace and unity. | |

=== Historical ===
| Municipality | Flag | Emblem | Enactment Date Abolition Date | Description | Ref. |
|---|---|---|---|---|---|
| Akan | | | 10 August 1952 11 October 2005 | A green flag with a white emblem. The emblem is the town's name in stylized katakana (ア力ン). The circle symbolizes harmony and unity while the wings represent development. | |
| Onbetsu | | | 20 August 1965 11 October 2005 | A blue flag a white "on" (オン) and a white letter "C". The "C" represents coal, the "on" represents forestry and the circle represents agriculture. The circle also represents the townspeople. The triangle represents development and expansionism through the heavens. | |

== Nemuro Subprefecture ==
=== Cities ===
| Municipality | Flag | Emblem | Enactment Date | Description | Ref. |
|---|---|---|---|---|---|
| Nemuro | | | 6 November 1934 | A blue flag with a red stylized "ne" (ネ) and six red stylized "ro" (ロ). The emblem represents cooperation and red represents future. | |

=== Towns ===
| Municipality | Flag | Emblem | Enactment Date | Description | Ref. |
|---|---|---|---|---|---|
| Betsukai | | | 25 June 1968 | A green flag with a brown emblem. The emblem represents development, future, improvement, harmony and unity. Green represents infinity. | |
| Nakashibetsu | | | 1 January 1950 | A green flag with a white stylized "naka" (中) and a white stylized "shibetsu" (シベツ). The emblem resembles three fans. The circle symbolizes harmony and the town's geographical position in the Nemuro District. | |
| Rausu | | | Emblem Enactment: October 1950; Emblem Reenactment: 20 September 1970; Flag Enactment: 15 September 1974 | A blue flag with a white stylized "ra" (羅) and a white stylized "usu" (臼). The emblem represents harmious development. | |
| Shibetsu | | | 1 January 1958 | A white flag with a purple emblem. The emblem is the town's name in stylized katakana (シベツ). The triangle represents mountains and the down arrow represents the Sea of Okhotsk. When combined, it represents a river. | |

== Okhotsk Subprefecture ==
=== Cities ===
| Municipality | Flag | Emblem | Enactment Date | Description | Ref. |
|---|---|---|---|---|---|
| Abashiri | | | Emblem: 22 March 1940; Flag: 29 July 1968 | A blue flag with a white Polaris and a red circle. The red circle contain a white stylized "a" (ア) and a white stylized "bashiri" (走) in a shape of an anchor. It represents the Abashiri Port. | |
| Kitami | | | 5 March 2006 | A blue flag with a white stylized "kita" (北). It resembles a weight represent fair judgement. | |
| Monbetsu | | | Emblem: 1 April 1941; Flag: 1 July 1978 | A white flag with a green stylized "mon" (紋). The circle represents the city's direction to the Sea of Okhotsk while the two "bun" (文) is combined into a boat. White represents ice and green represents hope. | |

=== Towns and villages ===
| Municipality | Flag | Emblem | Enactment Date | Description | Ref. |
|---|---|---|---|---|---|
| Bihoro | | | Emblem: 6 November 1937 | The emblem consists of the town's name in katakana with "bi" (ビ) forming the top outer semicircle, "ho" (ホ) splitting into two halves and forming the inner circle, and "ro" (ロ) forming the bottom outer semicircle. | |
| Bihoro | | | Flag: 1 September 1967 | A blue flag with the town's name in stylized katakana (ビホロ) in white. It represents infinite flight. Blue represents the sky and dark blue stylized "ho" (ホ) represents unity. | |
| Engaru | | | Enactment: March 1935; Inheritance: 1 October 2005 | A blue flag with a Polaris star and three interlocked circles with the town's name on the left. The Polaris represents the former Kitami Province and the three circles represents the three principles of the town (time, nature and harmony). | |
| Engaru | | | Enactment: March 1935; Inheritance: 1 October 2005 | Fringed variant. | |
| Kiyosato | | | 1953 | A white flag with a red emblem. The circles represent harmony while the triangle represents Mount Shari. | |
| Koshimizu | | | Publication: 1 October 1953; Enactment: 7 October 1953 | A blue flag with a white emblem. The emblem is the town's name in stylized kanji (小清水) to represent nature. | |
| Kunneppu | | | 1 November 1951 | A blue flag with a black and white emblem. The emblem is a black and white stylized "kita" (北) surrounding a black stylized "kun" (訓). The "kita" represents Hokkaido and the Okhotsk Subprefecture while the "kun" represents Kunneppu. The combination of the two represents cooperation. | |
| Nishiokoppe | | | 20 December 1967 | A green flag with a white stylized "nishi" (西). The triangle represents the village's location and its citizens. It also represents sturdiness. | |
| Oketo | | | 31 July 1949 | A white flag with a green emblem. The emblem is the town's name in stylized katakana (オキト). The emblem resembles a mountain and a large tree. It represents the town's relationship with the forests. | |
| Okoppe | | | Emblem: 20 October 1923 | The emblem consists of three "kita" (北), which represents the town's location in Hokkaido. They are coloured green to symbolize peace and development. The red "oko" (興) represents sincerity and enthusiasm. | |
| Okoppe | | | Flag: 1 April 1968 | A milk white flag with an ultramarine blue stylized "OP" The ultramarine blue represents the sky full of wind and snow and the Sea of Okhotsk, and the milky white represents milk. Means. The "P" represents fishing boats and the "O" represents affinity and power. | |
| Ōmu | | | 10 November 1923 | A blue flag with six white stylized "o" (ヲ) and a yellow Polaris star. The six "o" resembles a snowflake. The Polaris represents the Okhotsk Subprefecture. Blue represents the sky and the Sea of Okhotsk. | |
| Ōzora | | | 31 March 2006 | A green flag with a stylized "O". The emblem represents contact and conversation. The blue and white represents the sky and green represents agriculture. The streamlines represents the Memanbetsu Airport. | |
| Saroma | | | 1 April 1953 | A purple flag with a white emblem. The emblem is the town's name in stylized katakana (サロマ). The emblem represents the human heart, unity, coexistence, co-prosperity and peace. | |
| Shari | | | Publication: 21 September 1958; Enactment: 24 September 1958; Flag: 17 May 1968 | A purple flag with a white emblem. The emblem is the town's name in stylized katakana (シャリ). The emblem is shaped like a bird to represent the leap towards development. The circle represents peace. | |
| Takinoue | | | 19 February 1958 | A green flag with a white stylized "taki" (タキ) and a white stylized "ue" (上). The triangle represents mountains while the circles symbolizes farmland. | |
| Tsubetsu | | | 1 July 1958 | A maroon flag with a white stylized "tsu" (ツ) and a white stylized "betsu" (別). The "tsu" represents mountains, white represents soil. The emblem represents the future. | |
| Yūbetsu | | | 5 October 2009 | A light blue flag with a blue stylized "yu" (ゆ) and green Polaris star. The Polaris represents the pioneers and future. Blue represents the Sea of Okhotsk, and the Polaris represents the crops. | |

=== Historical ===
| Municipality | Flag | Emblem | Enactment Date Abolition Date | Description | Ref. |
|---|---|---|---|---|---|
| Higashimokoto | | | 11 February 1947 31 March 2006 | A purple flag with a combination of a white stylized "higa" (東) and a white stylized "mokoto" (モコト). The white circle represents the Heiwago area. White represents Mount Mokoto. The "higa" represents dawn. | |
| Ikutahara | | | 11 December 1944 1 October 2005 | A green flag with a white flower. Eight white petals represents the cooperation of the districts (Asahino, Ikutahara, Ibuki, Iwato, Kiyosato, Mizuho, Yae and Yasukuni) and the red stigma represents Ikutahara. | |
| Kamiyūbetsu | | | 18 June 1968 5 October 2009 | A blue flag with a green stylized "kami" (カミ) and an orange Polaris star. The circle represents unity and the vertical line represents power. | |
| Maruseppu | | | 15 April 1949 1 October 2006 | A blue flag with a white stylized "maru" (丸). The circle symbolizes the sum of residents. The triangle, three pine trees, and the three tree trunks represent the Yubetsu, Takeri, and Marusefu rivers. | |
| Memanbetsu | | | 12 March 1968 31 March 2006 | A blue flag with a red stylized "me" (女). The "me" represents peace, the five points represents expansion and the circle represents harmony and unity. | |
| Rubeshibe | | | 12 August 1964 5 March 2006 | A green flag with a white stylized "ru" (ル). The "ru" resembles a mountain, a steam from an onsen and a human heart. While the sides of the "ru" represent either freedom, equality and friendship or agriculture, forestry, commerce, and tourism, it also represents means stability, fulfillment and development. The heart shape represents the future. | |
| Shirataki | | | 1 August 1949 1 October 2006 | A green flag with a white stylized "shira" (白). | |
| Shimoyubetsu | | | 8 October 1937 1 October 1953 | A white flag with a black emblem. The circle is a stylized black "shimo" (下) and a stylized black "yu" (ユ). The black Polaris star represents Hokkaido. Together, the emblem represents hope with heaven and earth. | |
| Tanno | | | 1 December 1946 5 March 2006 | A green flag with an emblem. The emblem is the town's name in red stylized katakana (タンノ), a yellow Polaris star and a white snowflake. Green represents peace on earth, the snowflake and its ten points represents the ten districts, red represents vitality. The Polaris represents the pioneers. | |
| Tanno | | | 1 December 1946 5 March 2006 | Fringed variant. | |
| Tsubetsu | | | 10 September 1949 1 July 1958 | A white flag with a black emblem. | |
| Tokoro | | | 1 November 1950 5 March 2006 | A blue flag with three white stylized "ro" (呂) surrounding a white stylized "toko" (常). It represents cooperation, unity and expansionism. | |
| Yubetsu | | | 1 October 1953 5 October 2009 | A blue flag with a white emblem. The emblem is a white stylized "yu" (湧) inside a white Polaris star (representing Hokkaido) surrounded by a white stylized "betsu" (別). | |

== Oshima Subprefecture ==
=== Cities ===
| Municipality | Flag | Emblem | Enactment Date | Description | Ref. |
|---|---|---|---|---|---|
| Hakodate | | | Emblem: 13 July 1935; Flag: 11 June 1968 | A blue flag with a red and white emblem. The emblem of the city is emblem with a red stylized star is that prevalent during the Meiji era. The tomoe represents the Port of Hakodate. The white Polaris star represents the future. The blue stands for the Pacific Ocean and the sky. | |
| Hokuto | | | 1 February 2006 | A white flag with an emblem. The emblem is both a stylized "hoku" (北) and a stylized "H". Blue represents the Pacific Ocean and it is the colour of Kamiiso. Green is of the land and of Ōno. Yellow represents the merger of the two. It represents Hokkaido's gateway to Honshu. | |

=== Towns ===
| Municipality | Flag | Emblem | Enactment Date | Description | Ref. |
|---|---|---|---|---|---|
| Fukushima | | | 3 November 1975 | A yellow flag with a blue emblem. The emblem is the town's name in stylized katakana (フクシマ). The emblem resembles a ship to represent herring fishing. The emblem represents Mount Daisengen and the Seikan Tunnel. The two outer circles symbolize development. Yellow for the sun, blue for the sky and the Pacific Ocean and white for nature. | |
| Kikonai | | | 16 June 1942 | A blue flag with a white emblem. The white emblem is the town's name in stylized kanji (木古内). It symbolizes peaceful cooperation through development. | |
| Matsumae | | | Publication: July 1954; Enactment: 22 September 1954 | A maroon flag with a white emblem. Maroon represents the spiritual strength of the pioneers and the passionate earth. The emblem contains three pine needles to symbolize youth and strength as a means to avoid any difficulties. They form a tomoe to represent harmony and cooperation. | |
| Mori | | | Emblem: 29 September 2005; Flag: 10 November 2005 | A white flag with a stylized "mori" (森). The blue represents the waves of Pacific Ocean and green for forests. It expresses nature and people. Designed by Toshio Toda and Rika. | |
| Nanae | | | Enactment: 3 November 1977; Specification: 10 November 2005 | A blue flag with a seven interlocking red circles. The circles represent eternal unity and development. | |
| Oshamambe | | | 29 August 1973 | A white flag with a stylized red "oshama" (長). The emblem represents the relationships between its citizens and the Uchiura Bay. | |
| Shikabe | | | 4 January 1920 | A white flag with an emblem. The emblem contains four blue stylized "ka" (カ) to represent the presence of deer. The center of the emblem is a kelp and a hot spring to represent development. | |
| Shiriuchi | | | 1 October 1967 | A blue flag with a green and white emblem. The emblem consists of a white stylized "S" to represent the Shiriuchi River and green is for plains. The emblem represent peace and solidarity. | |
| Yakumo | | | 1 October 2005 | A blue flag with a blue emblem. The consists of a blue stylized "ya" (八) in a form of waves. The circle represents the brightness of the energetic sun as a means of development. | |

=== Historical ===
| Municipality | Flag | Emblem | Enactment Date Abolition Date | Description | Ref. |
|---|---|---|---|---|---|
| Esan | | | 26 April 1918 1 December 2004 | A maroon flag with the four tomoes. The four tomoes represents the bays while the circle represents satisfaction and wholeness. | |
| Fukushima | | | 14 September 1965 3 November 1975 | A white flag with a black and gold emblem. | |
| Kameda | | | 12 November 1915 1 December 1973 | A white flag with a red emblem. The red emblem is the town's name in stylized kanji (亀田). The points represents Kameda, Kamiyama, Tanya, Kikyō, Ishikawa and the rice fields surrounding them. | |
| Kamiiso | | | 15 April 1916 1 February 2006 | A blue flag with four white stylized "kamii" (上). The four "kamii" forms a diamond to represent the unity and development of the four villages. | |
| Kikonai | | | 30 October 1917 16 June 1942 | A white flag with a black emblem. The black emblem is the village's name in stylized kanji (木古内). | |
| Kumaishi | | | 17 March 1968 1 October 2005 | A blue flag with a fish in front of a bow of a ship. | |
| Ōno | | | 21 December 1915 1 February 2006 | A green flag with a yellow emblem. The yellow emblem consists of three yellow stylized "ō" (大) and three yellow stylized "no" (の). It is unknown about what the emblem means but it is believed that it represents the development and prosperity of the residents towards the future. | |
| Minamikayabe | | | 1 September 1959 1 December 2004 | A blue flag with a green stylized "M" and a six pointed star. It represents the merge of Osatsube and Usujiri. The star represents Hokkaido. | |
| Mori | | | 24 December 1966 10 November 2005 | A blue flag with three green stars. The green stars are actually a green stylized "mori" (森). | |
| Osatsube | | | 1915 1 May 1959 | A white flag with a green emblem. | |
| Oshamanbe | | | April 1913 15 June 1953 | A white flag with a black emblem. | |
| Oshamanbe | | | 15 June 1953 29 August 1973 | A white flag with a black emblem. | |
| Otoshibe | | | June 1915 1 April 1957 | A white flag with a black and white flower. | |
| Sawara | | | 24 October 1918 1 April 2005 | A blue flag with two white tomoes. The tomoes represent harmony and development. | |
| Todohokke | | | 30 August 1976 1 December 2004 | A blue flag with a green stylized "to" (ト). | |
| Toi | | | 1 April 1968 1 December 2004 | A blue flag with a red stylized "to" (と). The emblem represents the whirlpools of Cape Shioshu. | |
| Usujiri | | | 23 April 1915 1 December 2004 | A white flag with a black emblem. | |
| Yakumo | | | 26 April 1917 1 October 2005 | A purple flag with a white emblem. The emblem represents clouds surrounding a white stylized "ya" (八) and a Polaris star. | |

== Rumoi Subprefecture ==
=== Cities ===
| Municipality | Flag | Emblem | Enactment Date | Description | Ref. |
|---|---|---|---|---|---|
| Rumoi | | | Emblem: 16 December 1964; Flag: 21 June 1968 | A blue flag with an emblem. The emblem is two yellow stylized "ru" (ル) to represent a seed of a plant. The four seagulls surrounds the "ru" represents the Rumoi Port and their wings represents harmony. | |

=== Towns and villages ===
| Municipality | Flag | Emblem | Enactment Date | Description | Ref. |
|---|---|---|---|---|---|
| Enbetsu | | | 29 March 1949 | A blue flag with a yellow emblem. The emblem is combination of a yellow stylized "e" (エ), "n" (ン) and "betsu" (別). It represents harmony and rice farming. | |
| Haboro | | | 1 August 1935 | A green flag with a white emblem. The emblem is the town's name in stylized katakana (ハボロ). The two "ha" (ハ) and a "ro" (ロ) represents harmony and the "bo" (ホ) symbolizes coal mining, rice farming and fishing. | |
| Mashike | | | 13 June 1972 | A blue flag with a white emblem. The emblem is the town's name consists of four white stylized "ma" (マ) and a white stylized "ke" (毛). It represents development, solidarity, peace and reconciliation. | |
| Obira | | | 26 November 1937 | A blue flag with a red and white emblem. The emblem consists of the Polaris star representing Hokkaido. The upper part is an "o" (小) and the lower part is a "bira" (平) in a form of a snowflake. It symbolizes strong and endless unity. | |
| Shosanbetsu | | | 16 April 1968 | A green flag with an orange emblem. The emblem is an orange stylized "shi" (し) and three triangles to symbolize the mountains and the Southern, Central and Northern districts. | |
| Teshio | | | 1 October 1950 | A green flag with an emblem. The emblem consists of four whit stylized "te" (天) to symbolize harmony and progress of all directions and the orange stylized "ho" (ホ) is for the integrity of autonomy while maintaining a good harvest. | |
| Tomamae | | | 18 December 1967 | A blue flag with a yellow emblem. The emblem is the town's name yellow stylized katakana (トママエ). It represents peace and harmony. The "e" (エ) represents creativity and development towards the future amongst the pioneers. The blue represents the sky, the Sea of Japan and a strong will of its citizens. Yellow represents a bright, powerful and prosperous future development. | |

== Shiribeshi Subprefecture ==
=== Cities ===
| Municipality | Flag | Emblem | Enactment Date | Description | Ref. |
|---|---|---|---|---|---|
| Otaru | | | 28 August 1922 | A white flag with a red emblem. The emblem is a red stylized "o" (小) inside a star representing snow. | |

=== Towns and villages ===
| Municipality | Flag | Emblem | Enactment Date | Description | Ref. |
|---|---|---|---|---|---|
| Akaigawa | | | 10 June 1968 | A white flag with an emblem. The emblem consists eight rectangles forming a diamond (representing agriculture), which is actually a green stylized "aka" (赤), inside a white circle to represent agricultural development. The red circle stands for energy, peace and unity. | |
| Furubira | | | 20 May 1968 | A white flag with a blue stylized "furu" (古). The wings symbolize growth and peace and the circle for peace, harmony and the Furubira Bay. The emblem represents progress and development. | |
| Iwanai | | | 16 February 1935 | A green flag with a white emblem. The emblem has a white stylized "nai" (内) and five rings are "iwa" (イワ). It represents enterprising. | |
| Kamoenai | | | 15 May 1968 | A purple flag with an emblem. The emblem consists of an orange triangle representing industry, tourism, and roads, a blue triangle representing the Furuu River and the harbor cove and a seagull representing development. | |
| Kimobetsu | | | 12 October 2016 | A white flag with an emblem. The emblem is a Prunus sargentii flower (the stingma is shaped like the letter K) to represent roads with a green diamond (representing Hokkaido). The emblem represents the spread prunus sargentii across Hokkaido. | |
| Kuromatsunai | | | 1 May 1959 | A maroon flag with an emblem. The emblem is a white stylized "kuro" (黒) surrounded by three pines (matsu). The three pine needles represents Kuromatsunai, Neppu and Tarukishi. In addition, the outer thickn pine needles is for health while the inner thin pink needles represents kindness of the heart and the roundness of the pine needle represents peace. | |
| Kutchan | | | 1 July 1991 | A white flag with a blue emblem. The emblem consistsof snowflakes and a white stylized "K". The snowflakes represents contact, the "K" is a bird that represents leap and dynamism, and the blue represents development and hope. | |
| Kyōgoku | | | 1 August 1957 | A green flag with a white stylized "kyō" (京). The circle represents harmony and peaceful unity through spiritual strength. | |
| Kyōwa | | | Publication: 1955; Enactment: 25 December 1956 | A white flag with a blue stylized "kyō" (共). It represents the cooperation of Kozawa, Maeda and Hattari (the villages that became Kyōwa). The circle represents harmony. | |
| Makkari | | | 23 December 1967 | A blue flag with six yellow stylized "ma" (マ). The six "ma" represents unity. Yellow represents rice. White represents winter, cleanliness, chastity, beauty, pure and peace. Blue represents the skies and development and breakthrough. The sharpness of the "ma" represents the mountain ranges that surrounds Mount Yōtei. | |
| Niki | | | 27 March 1965 | A blue flag with a maroon emblem. The emblem is the town's name in stylized kanji (仁木). The "ki" (木) is actually a snowflake that represents Hokkaido, the "ni" (仁) represents agriculture and the points of the "ki" represents rice. The combination represents the location of the town. | |
| Niseko | | | 15 May 1968 | A green flag with a white emblem. The emblem is the town's name in stylized katakana (ニセコ). The "ni" (ニ) is a cloud, the "se" (セ) is a mountain and the "ko" (コ) is a river. The emblem represents a leap towards future development by constant efforts, peace and unity with mountains and foothills. Green for hope and white for a wintry heart. | |
| Rankoshi | | | 1 December 1954 | A purple flag with an emblem. The emblem consists of four "ko" (コ) surrounding the Magnolia kobus flower (ran) and a gold and silver coin. It represents bright, elegant and harmonious breakthrough and development. | |
| Rusutsu | | | 2 September 1967 | A green flag with six white stylized "ru" (ル). The "ru" forms a sun that has three rays in six directions and a snowflake. The circle symbolizes tough strength through peaceful and cooperative means and the triangles represents the energy of the mountains. Green represent a rich peace. | |
| Shakotan | | | 11 August 1966 | A white flag with a blue emblem. The emblem features three blue seagulls (representing Bikuni, Irika and Yobetsu) carrying a "tan" (丹) is surrounded by seagulls. The "tan" is a ship crashing through the waves. It represents peace and prosperity. | |
| Shimamaki | | | 22 December 1967 | A blue flag with a yellow stylized "shima" (シマ). It represents development. Designed by Akira Miura of Sendai, Miyagi Prefecture. | |
| Suttsu | | | 15 January 1965 | A white flag with a blue stylized "sutttsu" (すつ). The four points of the "su" (す) represents the four towns and the "tsu" (つ) represents harmony by the Suttsu Bay. | |
| Tomari | | | 25 February 1937 | A white flag with a blue emblem. The emblem is the village's name in a blue stylized kanji (泊). The blue dot is akin to flag of Japan to represent harmony and development. | |
| Yoichi | | | 1 October 1935 | A blue flag with an emblem. The emblem consists of the town's name in a white stylized kanji (余市) encased with a yellow Polaris star. The Polaris represents development while the emblem represents unity and affinity. | |

=== Historical ===
| Municipality | Flag | Emblem | Enactment Date Abolition Date | Description | Ref. |
|---|---|---|---|---|---|
| Kimobetsu | | | 1 July 1952 12 October 2016 | A purple flag with a white emblem. The emblem is a white Polaris star with a white stylized "ki" (喜) to represent development. The purple represents the night sky. | |
| Kutchan | | | 1 April 1916 1 July 1991 | A white flag with a red emblem. The emblem is a Polaris star shaped like a snowflake with a red stylized "ku" (倶). | |
| Niseko | | | 1933 15 May 1968 | A white flag with a yellow Polaris star. | |
| Takashima | | | 1 May 1922 11 April 1940 | A white flag with a black emblem. | |

== Sorachi Subprefecture ==
=== Cities ===
| Municipality | Flag | Emblem | Enactment Date | Description | Ref. |
|---|---|---|---|---|---|
| Akabira | | | 2 December 1966 | A blue flag with a yellow emblem. The wings represents development. | |
| Ashibetsu | | | 3 July 1948 | A blue flag with a white emblem. The emblem is the town's name in stylized kanji (芦別) encased in a Polaris star symbolizing Hokkaido. Five diamonds represents development. The "asa" represents organizations while the "betsu" represents unity and peace. | |
| Bibai | | | 10 July 1970 | A white-orange-white-purple flag with a black stylized "hi" (ひ) in a form of a mussel to represent fisheries and coal mining. Purple and white represent the Ishikari River during the snowy and windy winter. Orange symbolizes a bright hope for the future. | |
| Fukagawa | | | 16 July 1963 | A white flag with a blue stylized "fuka" (フカ). It represents peace, harmony and development. | |
| Iwamizawa | | | Emblem: 1 April 1948; Flag: 22 June 1968 | A green flag with a yellow stylized "mi" (米) encased in a dark green and white diamond. The diamond symbolizes Hokkaido, the white represents waves surrounding the prefecture, the green represents the Ishikari Plain. The emblem together represents industry and culture through the transportation of rice. | |
| Mikasa | | | 8 March 1957 | A green flag with a yellow stylized "san" (三). The concept of the emblem reflects the three stages of development though the unity of the city's citizens, mining, commerce and industry and agriculture. | |
| Sunagawa | | | 21 June 1948 | A maroon flag with a white stylized "su" (す). The circle represents living through brightness and the lines surrounding it represents development. | |
| Takikawa | | | 1 April 1971 | A blue flag with a yellow stylized "kawa" (川). The emblem represents development at the confluence of the Ishikari and Sorachi rivers through agriculture, industry and commerce. | |
| Utashinai | | | 23 June 1989 | A yellow flag with a black emblem. The emblem is the town's name in stylized katakana (ウタシナイ) to express production. | |
| Yūbari | | | 2 August 1937 | A purple flag with a white emblem. The emblem consists of a white stylized "yu" (夕) encased in a hexagon in honor of the city's coal industry. | |

=== Towns ===
| Municipality | Flag | Emblem | Enactment Date | Description | Ref. |
|---|---|---|---|---|---|
| Chippubetsu | | | 1 June 1968 | A white flag with an emblem. The emblem consists of a blue and yellow stylized "chi" (チ). The pointy top represents the topography of the town while the yellow circles represents rice, heart and soul. | |
| Hokuryū | | | 23 July 1963 | A purple flag with a white emblem. The emblem is a combination of "hoku" (北) and the letter H. White represents rice, the upper point represents the mountains and the purple represents the Uryu and the Etaibetsu Rivers. | |
| Kamisunagawa | | | 1 January 1953 | A white flag with an emblem. The emblem of the town's name in stylized kanji (上砂) encased in a blue and white diamond. The parallelograms represents rivers. Designed by Seiichi Sasaya. | |
| Kamisunagawa | | | 1 January 1953 | Fringed variant. | |
| Kuriyama | | | 19 June 1963 | A white flag with a red stylized "ku" (く) to represent future development. | |
| Moseushi | | | 15 June 1968 | A white flag with a green stylized "mo" (も). It is shaped like a rice ear. The enclosures stands for cooperation The two opposing enclosures are cooperation and tie-ups, the two lines between represented peace, the circle symbolizes peace, harmony and unity, and the triangles represents the boundaries of the town. The emblem expresses progress and development. | |
| Naganuma | | | 12 September 1967 | A green flag with a white stylized "naga" (ナガ). The wings represent development and the birds, the letter N represents rice paddies and the circle represents unity, peace and harmony. | |
| Naie | | | Enactment: 18 March 1954; Partial Revision: 26 June 1980 | A red flag with an orange stylized "na" (ナ). It stands for peace and breakthrough. | |
| Naie | | | Enactment: 18 March 1954; Partial Revision: 26 June 1980 | Fringed variant. | |
| Nanporo | | | Publication: 10 June 1964; Enactment: 25 April 1979 | A white flag with a red emblem. The emblem is the town's old name (Minamihoro) in stylized katakana (ミナミホロ). The circles expresses stability and harmony and the Yubari, Chitose, and Yubari rivers. As a result, the emblem represents the terrain. | |
| Numata | | | 8 May 1954 | A red flag with a white emblem. The emblem is a combination of a white stylized "numa" (ヌマ) and a white stylized "ta" (田) to represent development and peace through unity, harmony and cooperation. | |
| Shintotsukawa | | | Emblem Publication: 25 July 1863; Emblem Enactment: 24 September 1983; Flag Enactment: 18 June 1998 | A white flag with a black emblem. The emblem is a black stylized "to" (十) encased in a diamond. It uses the same emblem as to Totsukawa, Nara Prefecture as a reference to a flood that struck the village in August 1902. Its citizens had to flee their homes to Hokkaido as a result of the flood. | |
| Tsukigata | | | 30 September 1940 | A purple flag with a black emblem. The emblem is a white stylized "tsuki" (月) encased in a snowflake. The snowflake expresses patience while the "tsuki" endurance. | |
| Urausu | | | 3 May 1968 | A purple flag with a white stylized "ura" (月) to represent development, improvement, happiness, solidarity and concord. | |
| Uryū | | | Emblem: 3 November 1954; Flag: 23 June 1989 | A blue flag with two yellow stylized "u" (ウ) to symbolize strong unity towards the future. Designed by Tatsushi Yamazaki. | |
| Yuni | | | 21 December 1967 | A purple flag with a white stylized "yu" (ユ). It represents peace under the protection of the Yūbari Mountains and the Umaoi Hills with fresh spirit and power. | |

=== Historical ===
| Municipality | Flag | Emblem | Enactment Date Abolition Date | Description | Ref. |
|---|---|---|---|---|---|
| Akabira | | | 1 July 1949 2 December 1966 | A white flag with a black emblem. | |
| Fukagawa | | | 31 August 1955 16 July 1963 | A white flag with a gold emblem. | |
| Horomukai | | | 9 August 1950 10 June 1964 | A white flag with a black emblem. | |
| Kakuta | | | 1917 23 March 1940 | A white flag with a black emblem. | |
| Kakuta | | | 23 March 1940 25 July 1949 | A white flag with a black emblem. | |
| Kita | | | 23 March 1940 27 March 2006 | A blue flag with an emblem. The emblem consists of the horizontal three lines representing the Ishikari River, heaven, earth and harmony. The circle represents the yen and the vertical and horizontal sections within the circle represents the village's dependence of rice on Kitamura. | |
| Kurisawa | | | Publication: 1921; Enactment: 20 June 1992 27 March 2006 | A purple flag with a stylized "kuri" (栗) encased in a yellow Polaris star. | |
| Kuriyama | | | 25 July 1949 19 June 1963 | A white flag with a black emblem. | |
| Naganuma | | | 9 May 1952 12 September 1967 | A black flag with a black emblem. | |
| Osamunai | | | 13 September 1957 1 May 1963 | A white flag with a purple stylized letter O. | |

== Sōya Subprefecture ==
=== Cities ===
| Municipality | Flag | Emblem | Enactment Date | Description | Ref. |
|---|---|---|---|---|---|
| Wakkanai | | | Emblem: 1 April 1949; Flag: 1 April 1968 | A blue flag with an emblem. The emblem is a stylized "waka" (水) to represent the city's past. The "waka" is split into three Ws to symblize will, knowledge, and labor. The star resembles a compass to represents the four directions of knowledge, creativity and labor though fishing and autonomy. | |

=== Towns and villages ===
| Municipality | Flag | Emblem | Enactment Date | Description | Ref. |
|---|---|---|---|---|---|
| Esashi | | | 20 March 2006 | A white flag with a stylized "e" (え). The green stands for the forests and blue for the Sea of Okhotsk and the rhombus represents Hokkaido. | |
| Hamatonbetsu | | | 12 January 1952 | A green flag with a white emblem. The emblem is a combination of a white stylized "hama" (ハマ), a white stylized "ton" (とん) and a white stylized "e" (え). The top of the "ha" stands for Shubundake, the lower tip of the "ma" symbolizes Cape Kitami Kamui (Shinnaiyama Road) and the central line represents Sea of Okhotsk. The green link and triangle symbolizes the mouth of the Tonbetsu River and the Tonbetsu fishing port that flows into the Sea of Okhotsk. | |
| Horonobe | | | 19 April 1968 | A green flag with an orange and white emblem. The emblem is the town's name in stylized katakana (ホロノヘ) to symbolize dairy farming, harmony, youth and growth. The dark green represents the plains and the milk industry and orange for abundance and brightness. | |
| Nakatonbetsu | | | 7 December 1933 | A blue flag with a white emblem. The emblem is a white "naka" (中) in a shape of a Polaris star. It is also shaped like a snowflake. | |
| Rebun | | | 1 April 1967 | A white flag with a red emblem. The emblem consists of a red stylized "re" (レ) and a red circle. The circle represents peace and unity. The "re" represents development of education, culture, industry and all fields of life. | |
| Rishiri | | | 1 May 1968 | A red flag with an emblem. The emblem a stylized "rishi" (りし) and represents the relations between Mount Rishiri and the waves of the Sea of Japan. | |
| Rishiri | | | 1 May 1968 | Fringed variant. | |
| Rishirifuji | | | Enactment: 1 September 1959; Reenactment: 30 September 1990 | A purple flag with a white emblem. The emblem consists of a white stylized "ri" (り) and a stylized "H". The circle represents the sun. The "ri" represents Mount Rishiri and the "H" stands for development, leap, peace and abundance through fishing. | |
| Sarufutsu | | | 9 May 1968 | A white flag with a red and blue emblem. The emblem consists of three ridges to symbolize intelligence, courage, and passion. The circlres represents the harmonious care of the village's administration towards poor people and resources. Designed by Machiko Sato. | |
| Toyotomi | | | 1 October 1940 | A maroon flag with a white and green emblem. The emblem expresses the abundant resources found on Earth. The pickaxe stands for natural resources, the leaves for the forest resources and the circle represents the Sarobetsu river and the Sarobetsu Plain. | |

=== Historical ===
| Municipality | Flag | Emblem | Enactment Date Abolition Date | Description | Ref. |
|---|---|---|---|---|---|
| Esashi | | | 1 October 1947 20 March 2006 | A white flag with a green emblem. The emblem is the town's name in stylized katakana (エサシ). It represents patriotism, a leap forwards the future and enthusiasm as an industrial town. | |
| Oshidomari | | | 1 April 1923 30 September 1956 | A white flag a black emblem. | |
| Utanobori | | | 25 May 1962 20 March 2006 | A white flag with a green emblem. The emblem consists of the letter U (representing the Sōya Subprefecture) surrounded by the semicircles (representing Hokkaido). The U are shaped like mountain and rivers and the white circle represents the plains, The inner ring that wraps the "U" symbolizes reconciliation and peace and the central lines symbolizes the hope, development and safety. | |

== Tokachi Subprefecture ==
=== Cities ===
| Municipality | Flag | Emblem | Enactment Date | Description | Ref. |
|---|---|---|---|---|---|
| Obihiro | | | Emblem: 1 April 1933; Flag: 9 September 1972 | A blue flag with a white emblem and a blue and yellow border. The emblem is a white stylized "o" (オ) surrounded by a "ro" (ロ) and a "kita" (北). The "kita" represents Hokkaido while the "o" and the "ro" represents a leap forward. The emblem Blue stands for freshness of the skies and the bodies of water that provide vegetation and plants, gold stands for the Tokachi, Satsunai and the Obihiro rivers and white for snow. | |

=== Towns and villages ===
| Municipality | Flag | Emblem | Enactment Date | Description | Ref. |
|---|---|---|---|---|---|
| Ashoro | | | Publication: 1 April 1965; Enactment: 1 October 1965 | A purple flag with a white stylized "asho" (アシ). The wings represent prosperity and the circle stands for harmony and unity. | |
| Hiroo | | | 1950 | A blue flag with a yellow stylized "hiro" (広) in a triangle. Each side resembles a scale of a fish and a breakwater protecting from waves to symbolize commerce, agriculture and fishing. The total number of sides represents harmonious development. | |
| Honbetsu | | | 9 November 1931 | A blue flag with a white emblem. The emblem is the town's name in stylized kanji (本別). The "hon" represents a leap towards the future and the "betsu" (in a form of a circle) represents unity and harmony. | |
| Ikeda | | | 3 June 1968 | A purple flag with an emblem. The emblem is a purple stylized "ike" (イケ) encased in a white triangle surrounded by a white circle. The circle represents the Toshibetsu and Tokachi Rivers. The three points of the triangle represents transportation and development through industry, economy and culture. The wings stands for unity. | |
| Kamishihoro | | | 1 May 1968 | A yellow flag with a green stylized "kami" (上). The upper part resembles wings to symbolize the sky and leaves to represent the ground while the lower part represents harmony and unity. | |
| Makubetsu | | | 24 December 1961 | A maroon flag with a white emblem. The emblem is the town's name in stylized kanji (幕別). The "maku" is shaped like a fan to symbolize development and the "betsu" (in a form of a circle) represents concord. | |
| Memuro | | | 13 September 1999 | A white flag with a green emblem. The emblem contains a Polaris star surrounded by five stylized "M"s. The Polaris star represents light while the five Ms represent a beautiful heart, a pleasant life, passion for work, wisdom of civilians and big dreams. Green represents agriculture, peace and moist. | |
| Memuro | | | 13 September 1999 | A blue flag with a green emblem. Fringed variant. | |
| Nakasatsunai | | | 1 September 1957 | A green flag with a white and red emblem. The emblem is the village's name in stylized kanji (中札内). The circle represents innocence and sincerity while the eleven beans that surrounds the circle stands for unity and cooperation. In addition, the eleven beans represents the town being separated from Taisho in 1929. and the eleven fields at the time of the separation. | |
| Otofuke | | | 10 April 1970 | A green flag with a white stylized "oto" (音). The emblem is a leaf that represents a leap towards future through strength. | |
| Rikubetsu | | | March 1950 | A green flag with a white stylized "riku" (リク) to symbolize peace. | |
| Sarabetsu | | | Emblem Publication: 1947; Emblem Enactment: 1 September 1948; Flag Enactment: 1 August 1972 | A green flag with a green, white and yellow emblem. The emblem is the village's name in stylized kanji (更別) encased in a green Japanese clover surrounded by a white potato (the two main agricultural products of the town) to symbolize a leap towards the future through the survival of the pioneers during the windy and snowy winter. The potato represents the spirit of the poineers while the clover represents dairy and rice farming. Green stands for the Sarobetsu Plain and peace and yellow and white represents richness. | |
| Shihoro | | | 12 July 1968 | A green flag with a green and red emblem. The emblem is a stylized "shi" (士). It resembles a bird that expresses the future with its wings representing well-being, harmony and unity. | |
| Shikaoi | | | Emblem Enactment: 10 July 1949; Emblem Reenactment: 1 April 1953 | | |
| Shikaoi | | | Flag: 24 August 1970 | A green-white-blue tricolor flag with two antlers (representing the town itself) and a sun (representing the Honmachi area). Green represents forests, white for the Daisetsuzan Volcanic Group and clearness and blue for Lake Shikaribetsu. | |
| Shimizu | | | Enactment: 8 May 1937; Reenactment: 18 June 1968 | A blue flag with an emblem. The emblem consists of a white stylized "shi" (清) encased in a red and white stylized "mizu" (水) surrounded by an ax, a hoe and a plow to represent the spirit of the pioneers and a leap forwards the future while opening up undeveloped lands. Blue represents the sky and the Hidaka Mountains, white symbolizes purity and richness and red for courage and passion. | |
| Shintoku | | | 1 February 1948 | A green flag with an emblem. The emblem consists of a red stylized "shin" (新) surrounded by a white stylized "toku" (得) to represents raising hands for the future. | |
| Taiki | | | Enactment: 23 February 1950; Revision: 28 February 1973 | A green flag with a yellow emblem. The emblem is the town's name in stylized kanji (大樹). The "ki" is a tree to represent growing development of ideas that is surrounded by a "tai" is a circle symbolizing hope for peaceful development. A variant of the flag uses a white emblem instead. | |
| Toyokoro | | | Emblem: 1 November 1950; Flag: 1 January 1965 | A maroon flag with a white emblem. The emblem is the town's name in stylized katakana (トヨコロ). It resembles ripples to represent infinite breakthrough through peace, fellowship, cooperation and unity. | |
| Urahoro | | | Emblem: 5 June 1949; Flag: 5 June 1969 | A purple flag with a white emblem. The emblem consists of a white stylized ura (浦) incased in a four pointed Polaris star that represents Tokachi Province. Purple stands for purity and nobility. | |

=== Historical ===
| Municipality | Flag | Emblem | Enactment Date Abolition Date | Description | Ref. |
|---|---|---|---|---|---|
| Chūrui | | | 15 January 1954 6 February 2006 | A green flag with an orange and white emblem. The emblem is a stylized "chū" (忠) to represent the sun shining in all directions. | |
| Kamishihoro | | | 28 June 1950 1 May 1968 | A white flag with a black emblem. | |
| Memuro | | | August 1919 13 September 1999 | A blue flag with a white and orange emblem. The town had a different emblem which is a yellow Polaris star (representing Hokkaido) that contain a stylized "mem" (芽). | |
| Otofuke | | | 1950 10 April 1970 | A white flag with a black emblem. | |
| Shihoro | | | 1 June 1926 12 July 1968 | A white flag with a black emblem. | |
