= Tochigi 4th district =

Japanese electoral district

Tochigi 4th District
- 栃木県第4区
- Parliamentary constituency for the Japanese House of Representatives
- Prefecture: Tochigi
- Proportional District: Northern Kanto
- Electorate: 355,959 (as of September 1, 2023)

Current constituency
- Created: 1994
- Seats: One
- Party: LDP
- Representative: Masaru Ishizaka

Tochigi 4th District (Japanese: 栃木県第4区, Hepburn: Tochigi ken dai-yon-ku) is an constituency of the Japanese House of Representatives in the National Diet of Japan.

== Area ==
=== Current district ===
As of 12 December 2024, the areas covered by this district are as follows:

- Oyama
- Mooka
- Shimotsuke
- Haga District
- Shimotsuga District

As a result of the 2022 reapportionments, the district lost the remaining areas of Tochigi city to Tochigi's 5th district, while gain the rest of Shimotsuke from Tochigi's 1st district

=== Areas from 2017 to 2022 ===
Between the second redistricting in 2017 and the third redistricting in 2022, the areas covered by this district were as follows:

- Tochigi
  - Ōhira
  - Fujioka
  - Tsuga
  - Iwafune
- Oyama
- Moka
- Shimotsuke
  - Ishibashi
  - Kokubunji
- Haga District
- Shimotsuga District

=== Areas from 2013 to 2017 ===
Between the first redistricting in 2013 and the second redistricting in 2017, the areas covered by this district were as follows:

- Tochigi
  - Ohira
  - Fujioka
  - Tsuga
- Oyama
- Moka
- Shimotsuke
  - Ishibashi
  - Kokubunji
- Haga District
- Shimotsuga District

=== Areas from before 2013 ===
From the creation of the district in 1994 until the first redistricting in 2013, the areas covered by this district were as follows:

- Oyama
- Moka
- Haga District
- Shimotsuga District

== History ==
From the creation of the district until 2012, every election was a fierce competition between Tsutomu Sato, who served as the chairman of the Liberal Democratic Party's General Affairs Committee and as Minister for Internal Affairs and Communications, and Kenji Yamaoka, who served as the chairman of the Democratic Party of Japan's Diet Affairs Committee and as the chairman of the National Public Safety Commission.

For the first four elections, Tsutomu beat Kenji every time by tens of thousands of votes. However, carried by the surge of the Democratic Party of Japan in the 2009 Japanese general election, Kenji was able to win the seat from Tsutomu and become a representative for the first time.

This victory was short-lived however, as in the 2012 Japanese general election, Tsutomu won back his seat with a large margin of over 80,000 votes, putting Kenji into 3rd place.

Tsutomu was able to secure major victories in the next 2 general elections, effectively denying the other candidates a seat on the Northern Kanto proportional representation block. This started to change in 2021 when Takao Fujioka was able to secure a seat on the proportional district, closing the gap to just 4,820 votes. He then went on to win the seat outright in the 2024 Japanese general election, unseating Tsutomu who was relegated to the proportional block seat.

== Elected representatives ==
Representative	Party	Years served	Notes
Tsutomu Sato	LDP	1996-2009	Supported by Komeito
Kenji Yamaoka	DPJ	2009-2012	Previously ran for the New Frontier Party in the 1996 Japanese general election and the Liberal Party in the 2000 Japanese general election.
Tsutomu Sato	LDP	2012-2024	Supported by Komeito
Takao Fujioka	CDP	2024-2026	Previously ran for Kibō no Tō in the 2017 Japanese general election and the Democratic Party of Japan in the 2014 Japanese general election.
Masaru Ishizaka	LDP	2026-	

== Election results ==
(*) - indicates an incumbent primary candidate

(†) - indicates an incumbent proportional district candidate

(‡) - indicates candidate was elected to a proportional representation district

(¶) - Indicates an incumbent candidate that lost the primary seat but won a seat in the proportional district

=== 2026 ===
2026 House of Representatives election
Party	Candidate	Votes	%
LDP	Masaru Ishizaka^{†}	87,743	47.1
Centrist Reform	Takao Fujioka^{*}^{†}	74,465	39.9
Sanseitō	Tomoko Noguchi	20,768	11.1
Independent	Manabu Onuki	3,456	1.9
Registered electors		350,584	
Turnout		186,432	54.24
LDP gain from Centrist Reform			

=== 2024 ===
2024 House of Representatives election
Party	Candidate	Votes	%
CDP	Takao Fujioka^{†}	96,573	53.41
LDP	Tsutomu Sato^{¶}	75,260	41.62
JCP	Hitoshi Kawakami	8,985	4.97
Registered electors		353,065	
Turnout			52.59
CDP gain from LDP			

=== 2021 ===
2021 House of Representatives election
Party	Candidate	Votes	%
LDP	Tsutomu Sato*	111,863	51.10
CDP	Takao Fujioka^{‡}	107,043	48.90
Registered electors		402,456	
Turnout			55.37
LDP hold			

=== 2017 ===
2017 House of Representatives election
Party	Candidate	Votes	%
LDP	Tsutomu Sato*	111,167	54.44
Kibō no Tō	Takao Fujioka	76,294	37.36
JCP	Toshihiko Yamazaki	16,741	8.20
Registered electors		406,035	
Turnout			51.58
LDP hold			

=== 2014 ===
2014 House of Representatives election
Party	Candidate	Votes	%
LDP	Tsutomu Sato*	114,328	59.13
Democratic	Takao Fujioka	62,251	32.20
JCP	Toshihiko Yamazaki	16,773	8.67
Registered electors		398,881	
Turnout			49.94
LDP hold			

=== 2012 ===
2012 House of Representatives election
Party	Candidate	Votes	%
LDP	Sato Tsutomu	109,762	51.13
Your	Takao Fujioka	49,021	22.83
Tomorrow	Kenji Yamaoka* (Note: Yamaoka left the Democratic Party of Japan after diverging with his party of a consumption tax increase. He official left on July 2, 2012 along with 51 other members of the National Diet)	26,310	12.25
Democratic	Kudo Hitomi^{†} (Note: Hitomi replaced Yamaoka as the Democratic Party's candidate. He was previously elected to the Hokkaido proportional representation block in the 2009 Japanese general election)	22,546	10.50
JCP	Toshitsugu Saotome	7,053	3.29
Registered electors		399,474	
Turnout			55.13
LDP gain from Tomorrow			

=== 2009 ===
2009 House of Representatives election
Party	Candidate	Votes	%
Democratic	Kenji Yamaoka^{†}	139,878	51.45
LDP	Sato Tsutomu^{¶}	109,287	40.20
Independent	Tetsuya Uetake	20,176	7.42
Happiness Realization	Chihiro Sekizawa	2,505	0.92
Registered electors		399,612	
Turnout			69.16
Democratic gain from LDP			

=== 2005 ===
2005 House of Representatives election
Party	Candidate	Votes	%
LDP	Sato Tsutomu*	140,304	54.24
Democratic	Kenji Yamaoka^{†}^{‡}	108,473	41.93
JCP	Toshihiko Yamazaki	9,900	3.83
Registered electors		394,394	
Turnout			66.87
LDP hold			

=== 2003 ===
2003 House of Representatives election
Party	Candidate	Votes	%
LDP	Sato Tsutomu*	125,031	52.75
Democratic	Kenji Yamaoka^{†}^{‡}	104,159	43.95
JCP	Toshihiko Yamazaki	7,822	3.30
Registered electors		389,745	
Turnout			62.04
LDP hold			

=== 2000 ===
2000 House of Representatives election
Party	Candidate	Votes	%
LDP	Sato Tsutomu*	115,284	48.81
Liberal	Kenji Yamaoka^{†}^{‡}	65,860	27.89
Democratic	Yutaka Nakai	42,503	18.00
JCP	Tadashi Iizuka	12,522	5.30
Registered electors		381,796	
Turnout			63.44
LDP hold			

=== 1996 ===
1996 House of Representatives election
Party	Candidate	Votes	%
LDP	Sato Tsutomu*	117,851	53.33
New Frontier	Kenji Yamaoka^{‡}	83,383	37.73
JCP	Hiroshi Aoki	14,899	6.74
Independent	Irino Masaaki	4,848	2.19
Registered electors		368,921	
Rejected ballots			61.53
LDP win (new seat)			
