= Shimotsuke Province =

Former province of Japan

Map of Japanese provinces (1868) with Shimotsuke Province highlighted

Shimotsuke Province (下野国, Shimotsuke no Kuni; Japanese pronunciation: [ɕì.mó̞.t͡sɨ̥.kè̞ (nò̞ kɯ̈̀.ɲ̟ì)]) was a province of Japan in the area of Japan that is today Tochigi Prefecture. Shimotsuke was bordered by Kōzuke, Hitachi, Mutsu and Shimōsa Provinces. Its abbreviated form name was Yashū (野州). Under the Engishiki classification system, Shimotsuke was ranked as one of the 13 "great countries" (大国) in terms of importance, and one of the 30 "far countries" (遠国) in terms of distance from the capital. The provincial capital is located in what is now the city of Tochigi. The Ichinomiya of the province is the Futarasan jinja located in what is now the city of Utsunomiya.

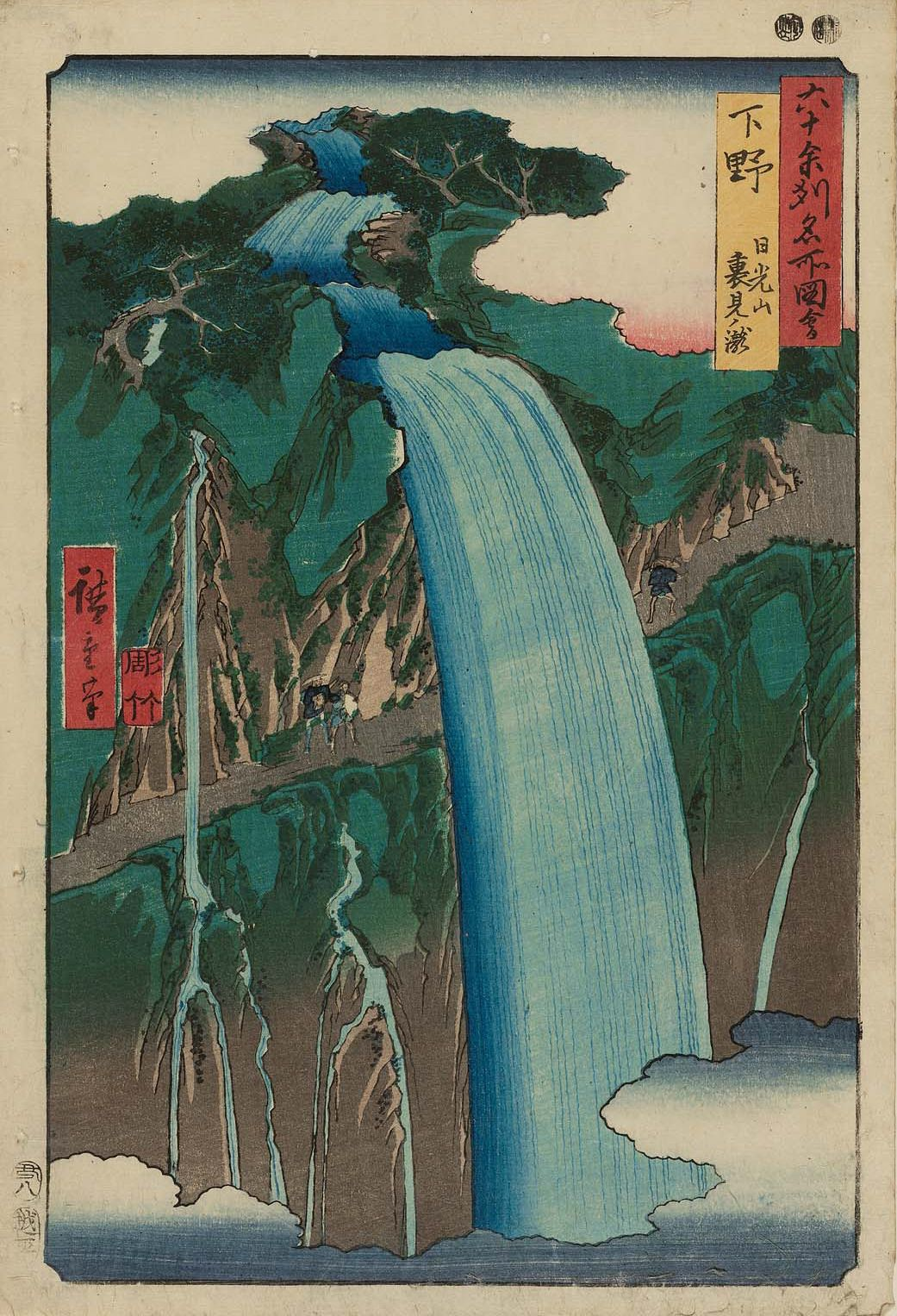
ukiyo-e " Shimotsuke " in "The Famous Scenes of the Sixty States" (六十余州名所図会), depicting Mount Nikkō, Urami Waterfall (Shimotsuke, Nikkōsan, Urami no taki)

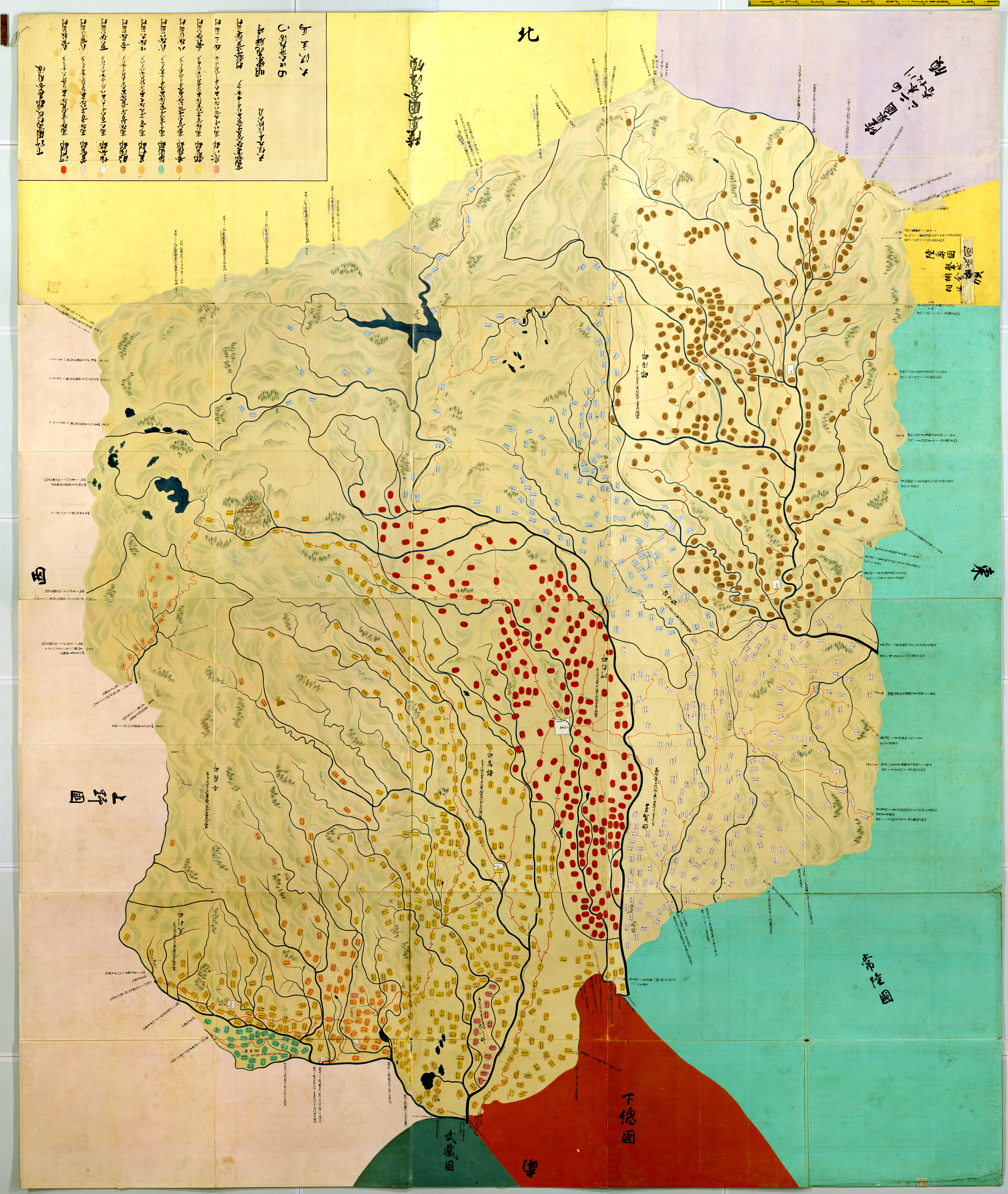
Shimotsuke province map (1838)

== History ==
During the 4th century, during the Kofun period, the area of modern Gunma and southern Tochigi prefectures was known as Keno or Kenu (毛野). At some unknown point in the 5th century, the area was divided at the Kinugawa River into Kamitsukeno (上毛野) and Shimotsukeno (下毛野). Per the Nara period Taihō Code, these provinces became Kamitsukeno-no-kuni (上毛野国) and Shimotsukeno-no-kuni (下毛野国). In 713, with the standardization of province names into two kanji, these names became Kōzuke (上野) and Shimozuke (下野).

The area of Shimotsuke is mentioned frequently in the Nara period Rikkokushi, including the Nihon Shoki and had strong connections with the Yamato court since the Kofun period. A large Buddhist temple complex, the Shimotsuke Yakushi-ji, located in what is now the city of Tochigi, dates from the Nara period.

From the Heian period, the area was dominated by a number of samurai bands, including the Utsunomiya clan, and the Nasu clan. A branch of the Minamoto clan, the Ashikaga rose to prominence during the Kamakura period from their shōen at what is now Ashikaga, and went on to create the Ashikaga shogunate of the Muromachi period.

During the Sengoku period, Shimotsuke was contested between the later Hōjō clan, the Takeda and the Uesugi clans. After the establishment of the Tokugawa shogunate, much of the province was assigned to several feudal domains. Tokugawa Ieyasu and Tokugawa Iemitsu chose the sacred site of Nikkō as the location of their tombs, and thus the area prospered as a pilgrimage site through the end of the Edo period.

The Nikkō Kaidō and the Ōshū Kaidō highways passed through the province, and numerous post stations were established.

Following the Meiji Restoration, the various domains were reorganized into prefectures with the abolition of the han system in 1871. These various prefectures merged to form Tochigi Prefecture in 1873.

== Historical districts ==
Shimotsuke Province consisted of ten districts:

- Tochigi Prefecture
  - Ashikaga District (足利郡) – absorbed Yamada District on April 1, 1896; later dissolved
  - Aso District (安蘇郡)- dissolved
  - Haga District (芳賀郡)
  - Kawachi District (河内郡)
  - Nasu District (那須郡)
  - Samukawa District (寒川郡) – merged into Shimotsuga District on April 1, 1889
  - Shioya District (塩谷郡)
  - Tsuga District (都賀郡)
    - Kamitsuga District (上都賀郡) – dissolved
    - Shimotsuga District (下都賀郡) – absorbed Samukawa District on April 1, 1889
  - Yamada District (梁田郡) – merged into Ashikaga District on April 1, 1896

== Bakumatsu period domains ==
Name	type	daimyo	kokudaka	notes
Utsunomiya Domain	fudai	Toda	77,000 koku	
Mibu Domain	fudai	Torii	30,000 koku	
Karasuyama Domain	fudai	Okubo	30,000 koku	
Sano Domain	fudai	Hotta	18,000 koku	
Kurobane Domain	tozama	Oseki	18,000 koku	
Ashikaga Domain	fudai	Toda	12,000 koku	
Ōtawara Domain	tozama	Ōtawara	11,000 koku	
Kitsuregawa Domain	tozama	Ashikaga	10,000 koku	
Fukiake Domain	tozama	Arima	10,000 koku	
