= List of people from Tochigi Prefecture =

This is a list of notable people from the prefecture of Tochigi, Japan.

== Politicians and activists ==
- Mayumi Moriyama, Japanese politician and former cabinet member
- Yoshimi Watanabe, the president of Your Party
- Toshimitsu Motegi, Japanese politician, several times a minister, including minister of foreign affairs in 2019 - 2021

== Athletes ==
- Ayagawa Gorōji, the second yokozuna sumo wrestler
- Hiromi Hara, former footballer
- Yumiko Hara, marathon runner
- Hokutōriki Hideki, sumo wrestler
- Takuro Ishii, baseball player for the Yokohama BayStars
- Guts Ishimatsu, boxer, actor and comedian
- Toshiaki Kawada, professional wrestler
- Tochigiyama Moriya, sumo wrestler
- Yoko Shibui, marathon runner
- Akashi Shiganosuke, first-ever yokozuna sumo wrestler
- Hidetoshi Wakui, footballer
- Shunsuke Watanabe, baseball player for the Chiba Lotte Marines

== Entertainers ==
- Arisa Komiya, voice actress and actress
- Minori Chihara, voice actress and a singer
- Toshio Furukawa, voice actor
- Rina Koike, actor and model
- Hikaru Midorikawa, voice actor
- Fumie Mizusawa, voice actress
- Yūko Ōshima, singer (AKB48) and actress
- Fumika Suzuki, gravure idol and model
- Umi Tenjin, voice actor
- Tomoko Yamaguchi, actress and singer
- Hitomi Honda, singer (AKB48, Iz*One)

== Musicians, composers and artists ==
- Yasushi Ishii, composer
- Tanaka Isson, artist
- Shima Kakoku, artist and photographer
- Masao Urino, writer and director
- Nobuko Yoshiya, novelist
- Toyotarou, mangaka
- Chisaki Morito, singer

== Notorious ==
- Chiyo Aizawa, high-profile murderer
- Yoshio Kodaira, rapist and serial killer
- Hiroshi Ogawa, murderer (less well known as a baseball player)

== Miscellaneous ==
- Masaru Ibuka, co-founder of Sony
- Hiromichi Kataura, carbon nanotube research
- Kuniaki Koiso, World War II general
- Takeji Nara, World War II general
- Yumio Nasu, World War II major general
- Namihei Odaira, founder of Hitachi
- Tsutomu Oohashi, scientist
