= Fukiake Domain =

Feudal domain of Edo Japan

Fukiake Domain 吹上藩
- under Tokugawa shogunate Japan
- 1842–1871
- Capital: Fukiake jin'ya
  - Type: Daimyō
- Historical era: Edo period
  - Established: 1842
  - Disestablished: 1871
- Today part of: part of Tochigi Prefecture

Fukiage Domain (吹上藩, Fukiage-han) was a feudal domain under the Tokugawa shogunate of Edo period Japan, located in Shimotsuke Province (modern-day Tochigi Prefecture), Japan. It was centered on Fukiage jin'ya in what is now part of the city of Tochigi. Fukiage was ruled through all of its history by a junior branch of the Arima clan.

== History ==
The Arima clan ruled Kurume Domain (210,000 koku) in Chikuzen Province. Arima Yoritsudo, the third son of the founder of the domain, Arima Toyouji, was allowed to found his own branch of the clan, and served as a hatamoto to Shōgun Tokugawa Hidetada and to his son, Tokugawa Tadanaga, with revenues of 10,000 koku, although he was not formally styled as a daimyō. His descendants served the Kii-branch of the Tokugawa clan for several generations. In 1726, shōgun Tokugawa Yoshinobu raised Arima Ujinori to the status of daimyō of Ise-Saijō Domain (10,000 koku). Five generations later, his descendants transferred the seat of the domain to Goi Domain in Kazusa Province in 1781. Another five generations later, in 1842, Arima Ujishige moved the seat of the domain once again, to Fukiage.

His son, Arima Ujihiro, inherited the domain in 1862, but was only age 2 at the time, and the administration of the domain remained in the hands of its Karō. The domain attacked Ashikaga Domain in its support of the suppression of the Mito rebellion in 1864, but quickly sided with the pro-imperial cause in the Boshin war of the Meiji restoration and fielded troops in suppression of the Ōuetsu Reppan Dōmei in 1868. In March 1869, a group of nine samurai of the domain stormed its Edo residence, and assassinated the Karō, who had been discovered to have embezzled funds provided by the government for the assistance of the families of the domain's samurai who had fallen in battle.

After the abolition of the han system in July 1871, Fukiage Domain became part of Tochigi Prefecture.

The domain had a population of 6,826 people in 1473 households, of which 383 were samurai in 106 households per a census in 1870.

== Holdings at the end of the Edo period ==
As with most domains in the han system, Fukiage Domain consisted of several discontinuous territories calculated to provide the assigned kokudaka, based on periodic cadastral surveys and projected agricultural yields. Due to its history, its territory was divided between Shimotsuke and Ise Provinces.

- Shimotsuke Province
  - 5 villages in Tsuga District
  - 5 villages in Kawachi District
  - 6villages in Moka District
- Ise Province
  - 6 villages in Mie District
  - 6 villages in Kawawa District
  - 5 villages in Taki District

== List of daimyōs ==
#	Name	Tenure	Courtesy title	Court Rank	kokudaka
Arima clan (tozama) 1842–1871
1	Arima Ujishige (有馬 氏郁)	1842–1858	Bungo-no-kami (備後守)	Lower 5th (従五位下)	10,000 koku
2	Arima Ujihiro (有馬氏弘)	1858–1871	Hyogo-no-kami (兵庫頭)	Lower 5th (従五位下)	10,000 koku
