= Nogi, Tochigi =

Nogi 野木町
- Town
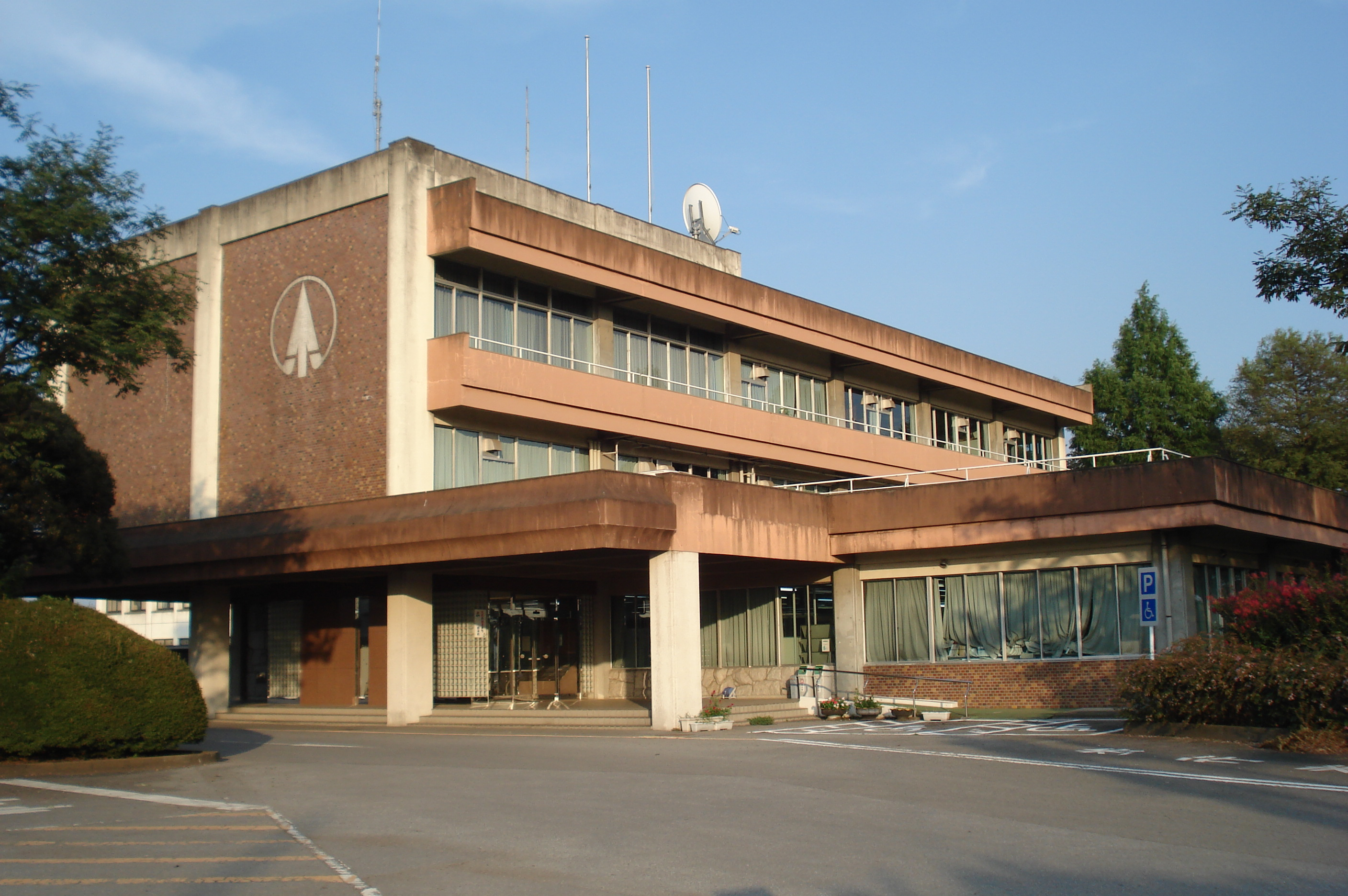
- Nogi Town Office

- Flag Seal

- Location of Nogi in Tochigi Prefecture

- Coordinates: 36°13′59.7″N 139°44′26.6″E
- Country: Japan
- Region: Kantō
- Prefecture: Tochigi
- District: Shimotsuga

Area
  - Total: 30.26 km^{2} (11.68 sq mi)

Population (April 2020)
  - Total: 25,050
  - Density: 827.8/km^{2} (2,144/sq mi)
- Time zone: UTC+9 (Japan Standard Time)
- Tree: Pagoda Tree
- Flower: Sunflower
- Address: Marubayashi 571, Nogi-machi, Shimotsuga-gun, Tochigi-ken 329-0195
- Website: Official website

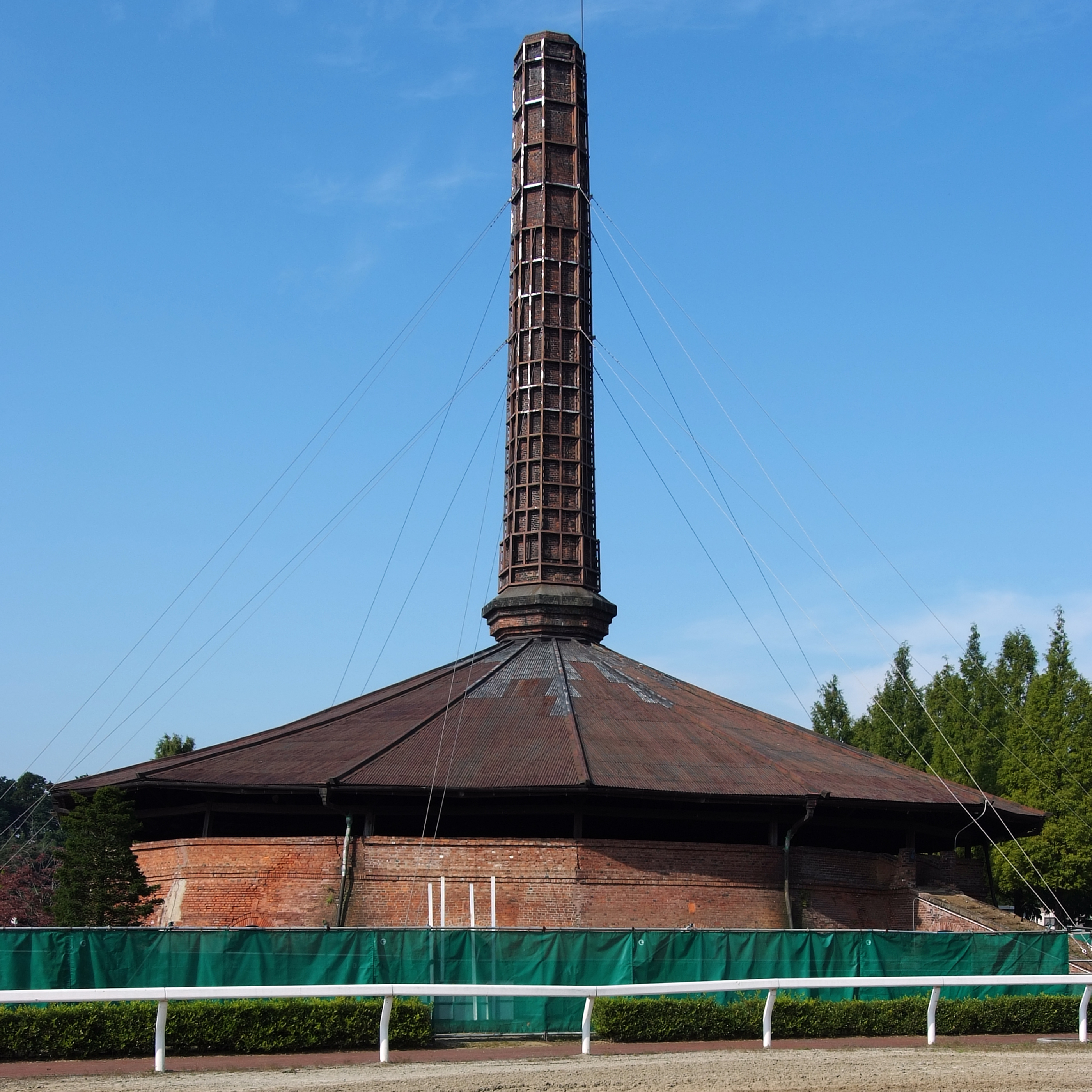
former Shimotsuke brickworks

Nogi (野木町, Nogi-machi) is a town located in Tochigi Prefecture, Japan. As of 1 April 2020, the town had an estimated population of 25,050 in 10,153 households, and a population density of 830 persons per km^{2}. The total area of the town is 30.26 square kilometres (11.68 sq mi).

== Geography ==
Nogi is located in the flatlands in the far southeast corner of Tochigi Prefecture.

== Surrounding municipalities ==
Ibaraki Prefecture

- Koga

Tochigi Prefecture

- Oyama
- Tochigi

== Climate ==
Nogi has a humid continental climate (Köppen Cfa) characterized by warm summers and cold winters with heavy snowfall. The average annual temperature in Nogi is 14.3 °C. The average annual rainfall is 1317 mm with September as the wettest month. The temperatures are highest on average in August, at around 26.4 °C, and lowest in January, at around 3.1 °C.

== Demographics ==
Per Japanese census data, the population of Nogi has recently plateaued after a long period of growth.

Historical population
Year	Pop.	±%
1920	7,982	—
1930	8,238	+3.2%
1940	8,737	+6.1%
1950	11,018	+26.1%
1960	9,974	−9.5%
1970	11,983	+20.1%
1980	16,454	+37.3%
1990	23,676	+43.9%
2000	26,674	+12.7%
2010	25,712	−3.6%
2020	24,913	−3.1%

== History ==
During the Edo period, Nogi-shuku was a post station on the Nikkō Kaidō highway connecting Edo with the shrines at Nikkō, located within Koga Domain. After the Meiji restoration, the area of Nogi was initially part of Ibaraki Prefecture, but was transferred to Tochigi Prefecture on November 14, 1871. Nogi village were created within Shimotsuga District on April 1, 1889, with the creation of the modern municipalities system. It was elevated to town status on January 1, 1965.

== Government ==
Nasu has a mayor-council form of government with a directly elected mayor and a unicameral town council of 14 members. Nogi, together with the city of Oyama collectively contributes five members to the Tochigi Prefectural Assembly. In terms of national politics, the town is part of Tochigi 4th district of the lower house of the Diet of Japan.

== Economy ==
The economy of Nogi is heavily dependent on agriculture; however, it is increasing becoming a commuter town due to its proximity to several metropolitan areas and is regarded as belonging to the Greater Kanto metropolitan area. The commuting rate is 18.8% to Koga, 13.1% for Tokyo metropolis, and 12.4% for Oyama per the 2010 national census. There are also several industrial parks in Nogi.

== Education ==
Nogi has five public primary schools and two public middle schools operated by the town government. The town does not have a high school.

== Transportation ==
=== Railway ===
JR East – Tohoku Main Line (Utsunomiya Line)

- Nogi

=== Highway ===
- National Route 4

== Local attractions ==
- former Shimotsuke brickworks Hoffman kiln (national Important Cultural Property)
- Nogi Jinja

== Noted people from Nogi ==
- Wakana Sakai, actress, writer and gravure idol
