= Fujioka Station =

Fujioka Station is the name of two train stations in Japan:

- Fujioka Station (Tochigi) (藤岡駅)
- Fujioka Station (Shizuoka) (富士岡駅)
