= Takayuki Terauchi =

Japanese baseball player (born 1983)

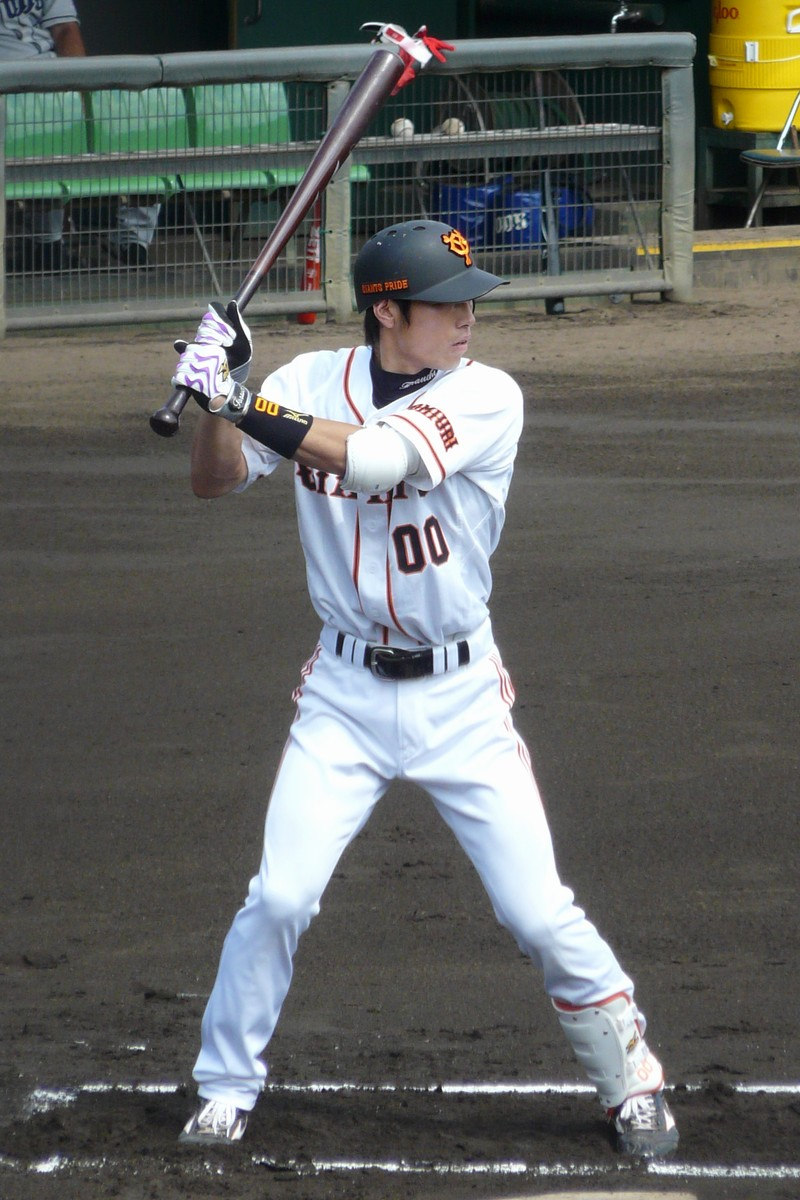
- Terauchi with the Yomiuri Giants

Tokyo Yakult Swallows – No. 75
- Infielder / Manager / Coach
- Born: May 27, 1983 (age 43); Tochigi, Japan
- Batted: Right Threw: Right

Nippon Professional Baseball debut
- May 23, 2008, for the Yomiuri Giants

Last NPB appearance
- September 14, 2017, for the Yomiuri Giants

NPB statistics (through 2017 season)
- Batting average: .218
- RBIs: 39
- Hits: 178
- Stats at Baseball Reference

Teams
- As player: Yomiuri Giants (2008–2018); As manager: Tochigi Golden Braves (2019-2024); As coach: Tokyo Yakult Swallows (2025-)

Career highlights and awards
- 2× Japan Series champion (2009, 2012); 1× NPB All-Star (2013)
- Last updated on: 21 December 2024

Takayuki Terauchi (寺内 崇幸, Terauchi Takayuki; born May 27, 1983, in Tochigi, Japan) is a Japanese Nippon Professional Baseball player for the Yomiuri Giants in Japan's Central League.

== See also ==
- List of people from Tochigi Prefecture
