= Kokugakuin Tochigi Junior College =

Coordinates: 36°21′50.4″N 139°42′8.7″E

- 国学院大学栃木短期大学
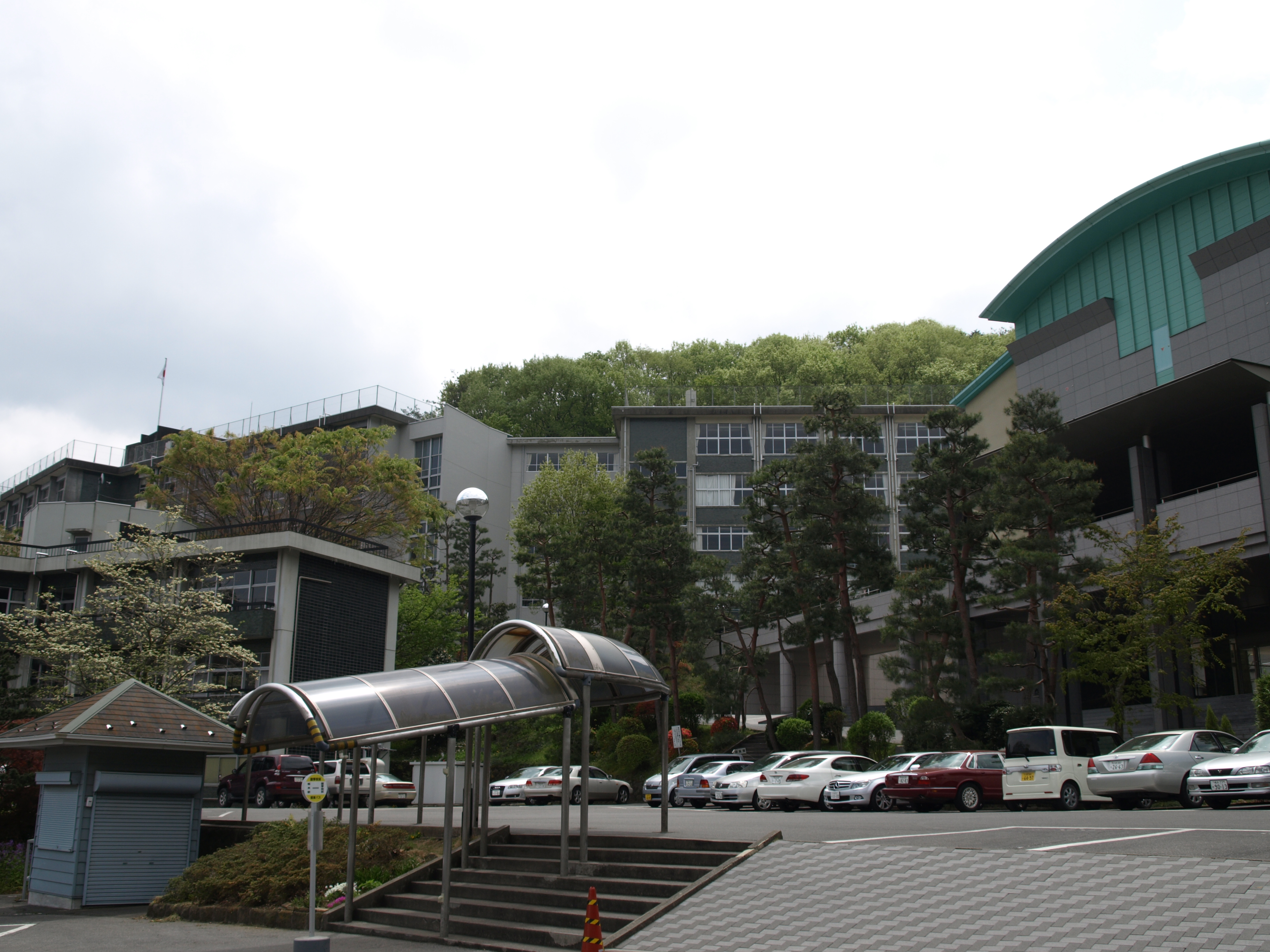
- Type: Private
- Established: 1966
- Location: Tochigi, Tochigi, Japan
- Website: http://www.kokugakuintochigi.ac.jp/tandai/

Kokugakuin Tochigi Junior College (国学院大学栃木短期大学, Kokugakuin daigaku tochigi tanki daigaku) is a private junior college in Tochigi, Tochigi, Japan. The school was founded as a junior women's college in 1966 before it became coeducational 2004.

The college is affiliated with the Kokugakuin University located in Tokyo, Japan.
