= Masaru Ishizaka =

- 石坂太

Member of the House of Representatives
- Incumbent
- Assumed office February 2026
- Preceded by: Takao Fujioka
- Constituency: Tochigi 4th district

Member of the Tochigi Prefectural Assembly
- In office 2019 – 23 January 2026

Personal details
- Born: 23 December 1980 (age 45)
- Party: Liberal Democratic Party
- Education: Takushoku University
- Website: m-ishizaka.com

Masaru Ishizaka (born 23 December 1980) is a Japanese politician from the Liberal Democratic Party. At the 2026 Japanese general election, he was elected to the House of Representatives.

== See also ==
- Representatives elected in the 2026 Japanese general election
