= Toyo Shibata =

Japanese poet (1911–2013)

Toyo Shibata (柴田 トヨ, Shibata Toyo; June 26, 1911 – January 20, 2013) was a bestselling Japanese poet.

== Biography ==
Shibata was born in 1911 in Tochigi, to a wealthy rice merchant family. As she grew up, she got married aged 33 and gave birth to a son named Ken'ichi.

After back pain forced Shibata to give up her hobby of classical Japanese dance, she turned to writing poetry at the age of 92, at the suggestion of her son Kenichi. Shibata's first anthology Kujikenaide (″Don't lose heart″), published in 2009, sold 1.58 million copies. In general, poetry book sales of 10,000 are considered successful in Japan. Her anthology also topped Japan's Oricon bestseller chart. It was originally self-published, but upon seeing its success the publisher Asuka Shinsha reissued it, with new artwork, in 2010. It contains 42 poems.

In December 2010, a TV documentary about Shibata was aired. As of 2011 she was writing poems for a second anthology, lived alone in the Tokyo suburbs, and was a widow.

Shibata died on January 20, 2013, at the age of 101. She died in a nursing home located in Utsunomiya, a city north of Tokyo.
