= Tōbu Kanasaki Station =

Railway station in Tochigi, Tochigi Prefecture, Japan

TN15 Tōbu-kanasaki Station 東武金崎駅
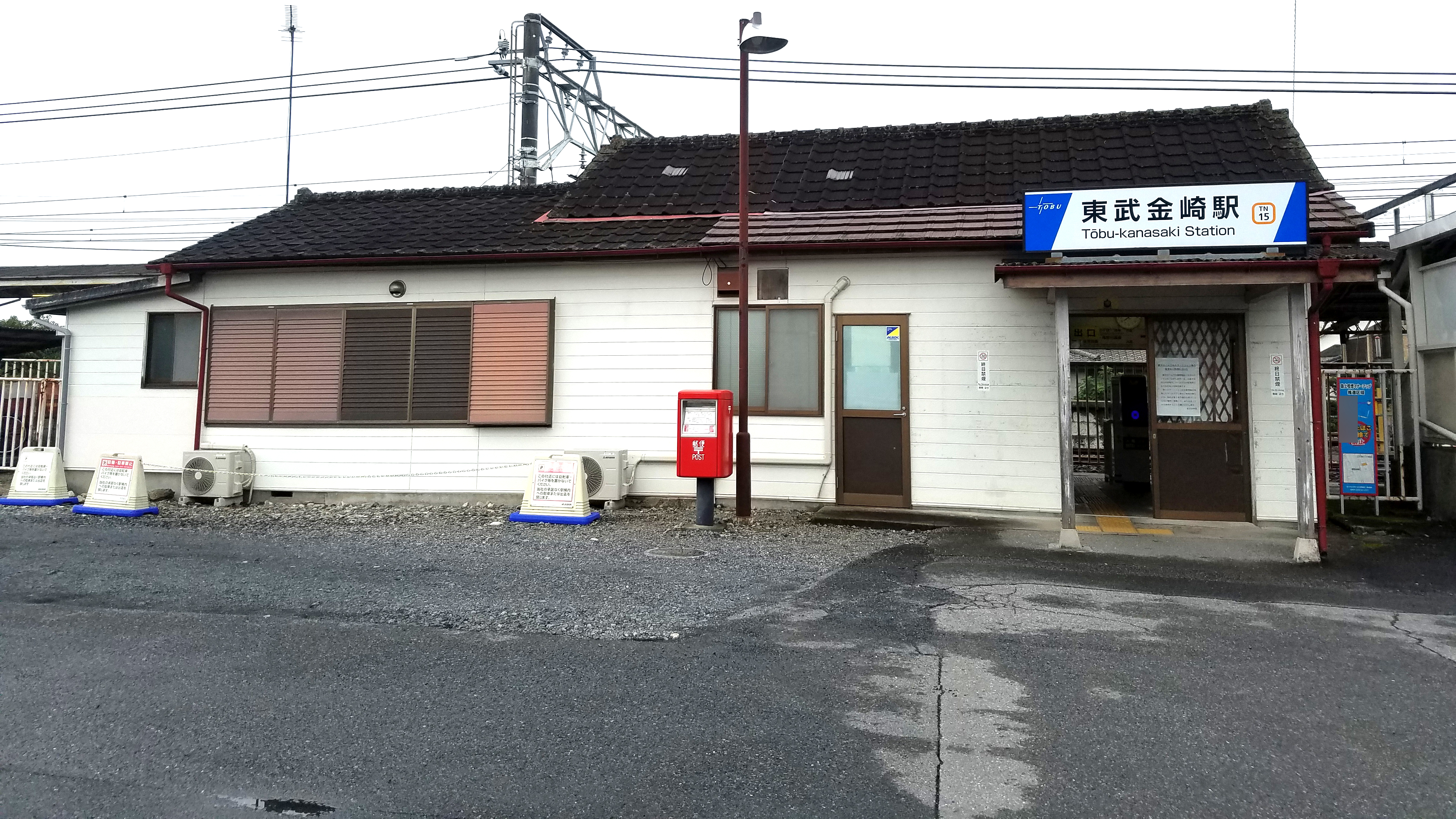
- Tōbu-kanasaki Station in August 2021

General information
- Location: 243-2 Kanasaki Nishikata-machi, Tochigi-shi, Tochigi-ken 322-0601; Japan
- Coordinates: 36.4664°N 139.7494°E
- Operator: Tobu Railway
- Line: Tobu Nikko Line
- Distance: 56.6 km from Tōbu-Dōbutsu-Kōen
- Platforms: 1 island platform

Other information
- Station code: TN-15
- Website: Official website

History
- Opened: 1 April 1929

Passengers
- FY2020: 545 daily

Services
Preceding station	Tobu Railway	Following station
Ienaka TN14 towards Tōbu-Dōbutsu-Kōen	Nikkō Line Local	Niregi TN16 towards Tōbu–Nikkō
Location
- Location within Tochigi Prefecture Location within Japan

Tōbu-kanasaki Station (東武金崎駅, Tōbu Kanasaki-eki) is a railway station in the city of Tochigi, Tochigi, Japan, operated by the private railway operator Tobu Railway. The station is numbered "TN-15".

== Lines ==
Tōbu-kanasaki Station is served by the Tobu Nikko Line, and is 56.6 km from the starting point of the line at Tōbu-Dōbutsu-Kōen.

== Station layout ==
This station consists of a single island platform serving two tracks, connected to the station building by a footbridge.

=== Platforms ===
1	■ Tobu Nikko Line	for Shin-Tochigi and Tōbu-Dōbutsu-Kōen
2	■ Tobu Nikko Line	for Tōbu-Nikkō

== History ==
Tōbu-kanasaki Station opened on 1 April 1929. It became unstaffed from 8 March 1972. The platform was lengthened in 2006.

From 17 March 2012, station numbering was introduced on all Tobu lines, with Tōbu-kanasaki Station becoming "TN-15".

== Passenger statistics ==
In fiscal 2019, the station was used by an average of 545 passengers daily (boarding passengers only).

== Surrounding area ==
- National Route 293
- Kanasaki Post Office

== See also ==
- List of railway stations in Japan
