= Minamikawachi, Tochigi =

Dissolved municipality in Tochigi prefecture, Japan

Coordinates: 36°23′2.2″N 139°52′36.8″E

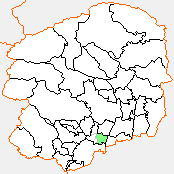
Map of Minamikawachi, Tochigi

Minamikawachi (南河内町, Minamikawachi-machi) was a town located in Kawachi District, Tochigi Prefecture, Japan.

As of 2003, the town had an estimated population of 21,178 and a density of 675.53 persons per km^{2}. The total area was 31.35 km^{2}.

On January 10, 2006, Minamikawachi, along with the towns of Ishibashi and Kokubunji (both from Shimotsuga District), was merged to create the new city of Shimotsuke.
