= Ienaka Station =

Railway station in Tochigi, Tochigi Prefecture, Japan

TN14 Ienaka Station 家中駅
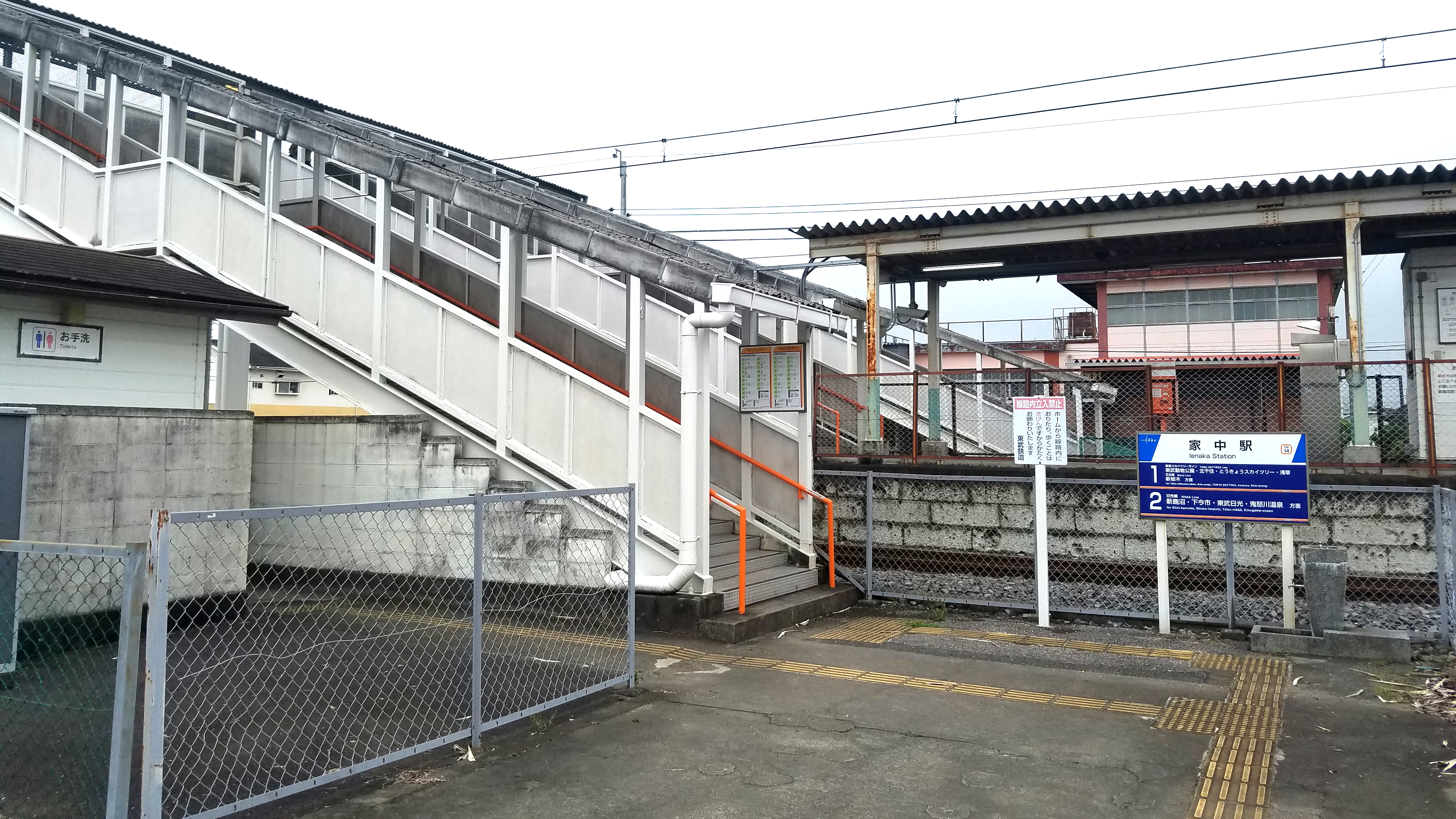
- Ienaka Station east exit in August 2021

General information
- Location: 5897-9 Ienaka Tsuga-machi, Tochigi-shi, Tochigi-ken 328-0111; Japan
- Coordinates: 36.4299°N 139.7473°E
- Operator: Tobu Railway
- Line: Tobu Nikko Line
- Distance: 52.4 km from Tōbu-Dōbutsu-Kōen
- Platforms: 1 island platform

Other information
- Station code: TN-14
- Website: Official website

History
- Opened: 1 April 1929

Passengers
- FY2020: 425 daily

Services
Preceding station	Tobu Railway	Following station
Kassemba TN13 towards Tōbu-Dōbutsu-Kōen	Nikkō Line Local	Tōbu Kanasaki TN15 towards Tōbu–Nikkō
Location
- Location within Tochigi Prefecture Location within Japan

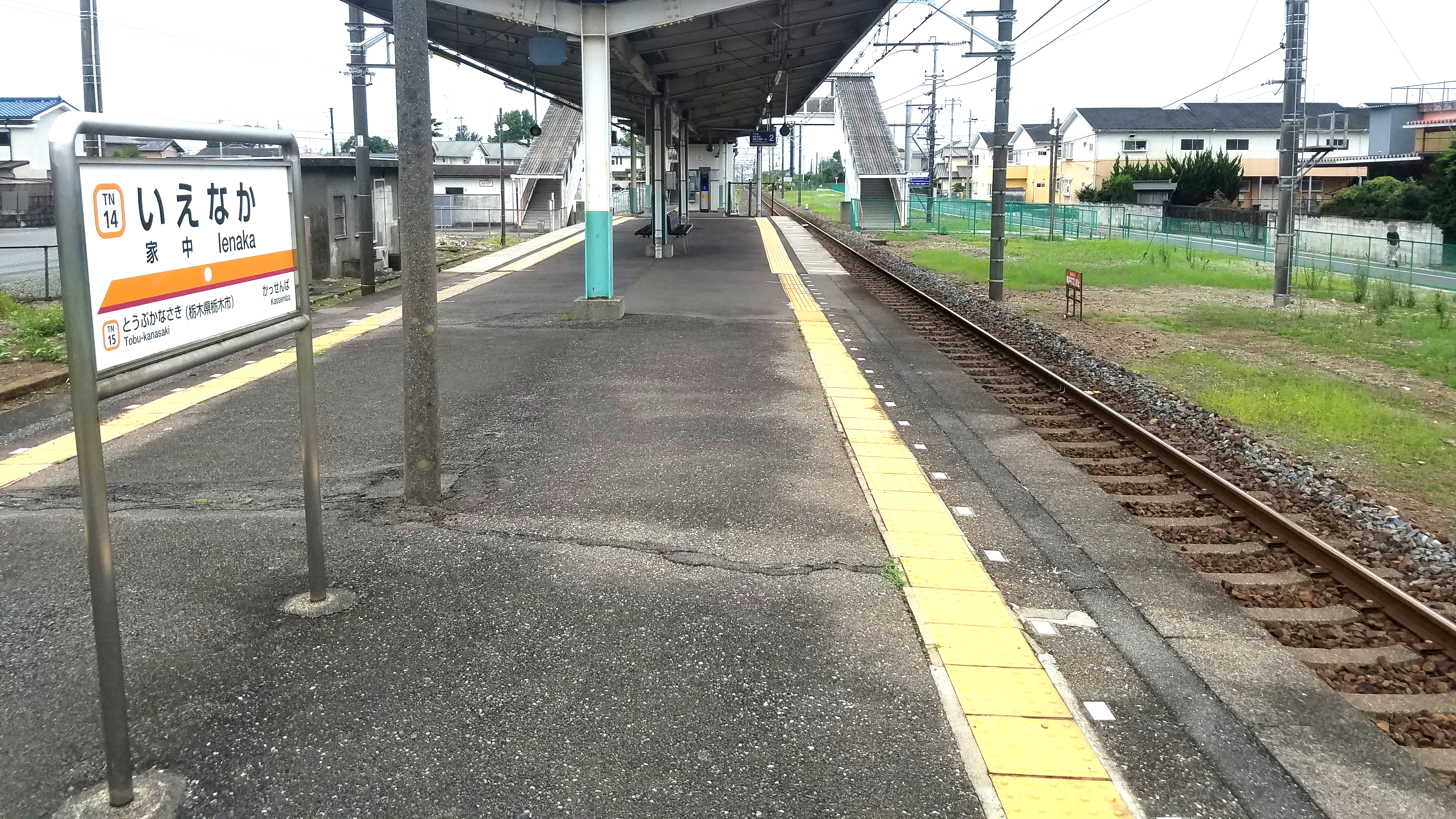
Ienaka station platform in August 2021

Ienaka Station (家中駅, Ienaka-eki) is a railway station in the city of Tochigi, Tochigi, Japan, operated by the private railway operator Tobu Railway. The station is numbered "TN-14".

== Lines ==
Ienaka Station is served by the Tobu Nikko Line, and is 52.4 km from the starting point of the line at Tōbu-Dōbutsu-Kōen.

== Station layout ==
This station consists of a single island platform serving two tracks, connected to the station building by an overhead passageway.

=== Platforms ===
1	■ Tobu Nikko Line	for Shin-Tochigi and Tōbu-Dōbutsu-Kōen
2	■ Tobu Nikko Line	for Tōbu-Nikkō

== History ==
Ienaka Station opened on 1 April 1929. It became unstaffed from 1 September 1973.

From 17 March 2012, station numbering was introduced on all Tobu lines, with Ienaka Station becoming "TN-14".

== Passenger statistics ==
In fiscal 2019, the station was used by an average of 425 passengers daily (boarding passengers only).

== Surrounding area ==
- former Tsuga town hall
- Ienaka Post Office

== See also ==
- List of railway stations in Japan
