= Tochigi (city) =

Tochigi 栃木市
- City
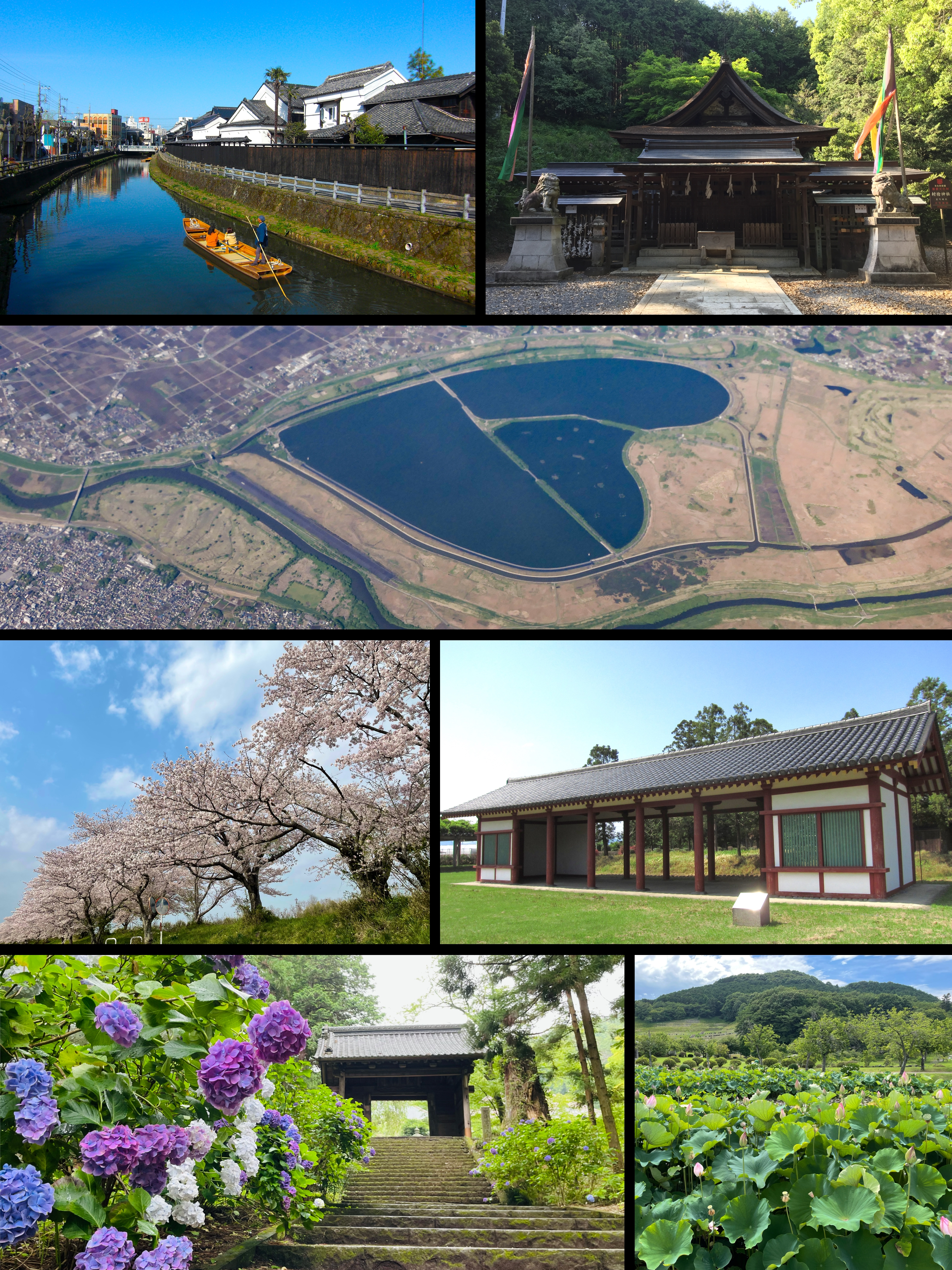

- Flag Seal

- Location of Tochigi in Tochigi Prefecture

- Coordinates: 36°22′52.8″N 139°43′49″E
- Country: Japan
- Region: Kantō
- Prefecture: Tochigi
- First official recorded: 40 BC
- City Settled: April 1, 1937

Government
  - Mayor: Masao Kotoyori (琴寄晶男) - from April 2026

Area
  - Total: 331.50 km^{2} (127.99 sq mi)

Population (June 1, 2023)
  - Total: 151,842
  - Density: 458.05/km^{2} (1,186.3/sq mi)
- Time zone: UTC+9 (Japan Standard Time)
- Tree: Japanese stuartia
- Flower: Japanese azalea
- Phone number: 0282-21-2224
- Address: 7-26 Irifune, Tochigi-shi, Tochigi-ken 328-8686
- Website: city.tochigi.lg.jp

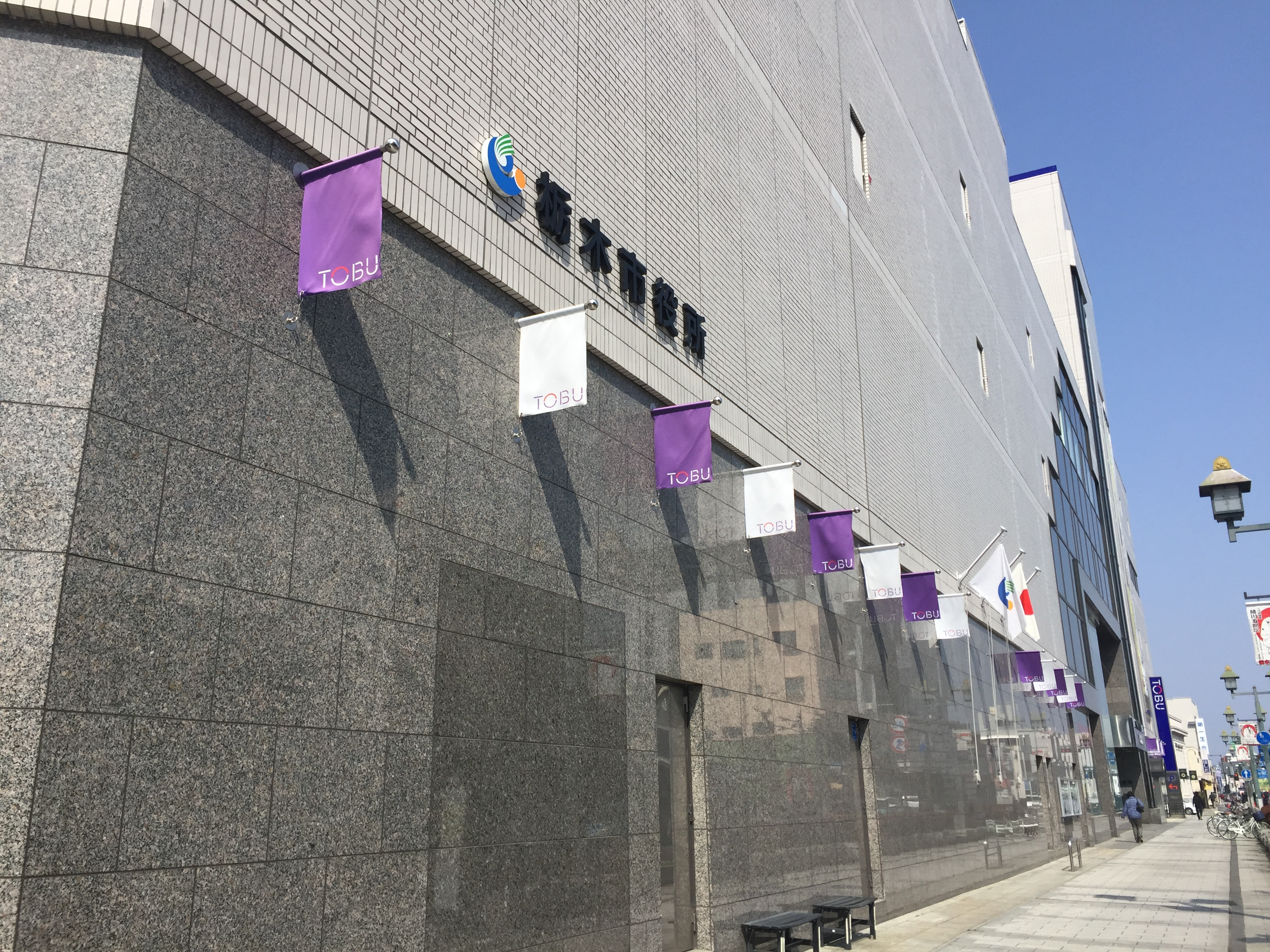
Tochigi city hall

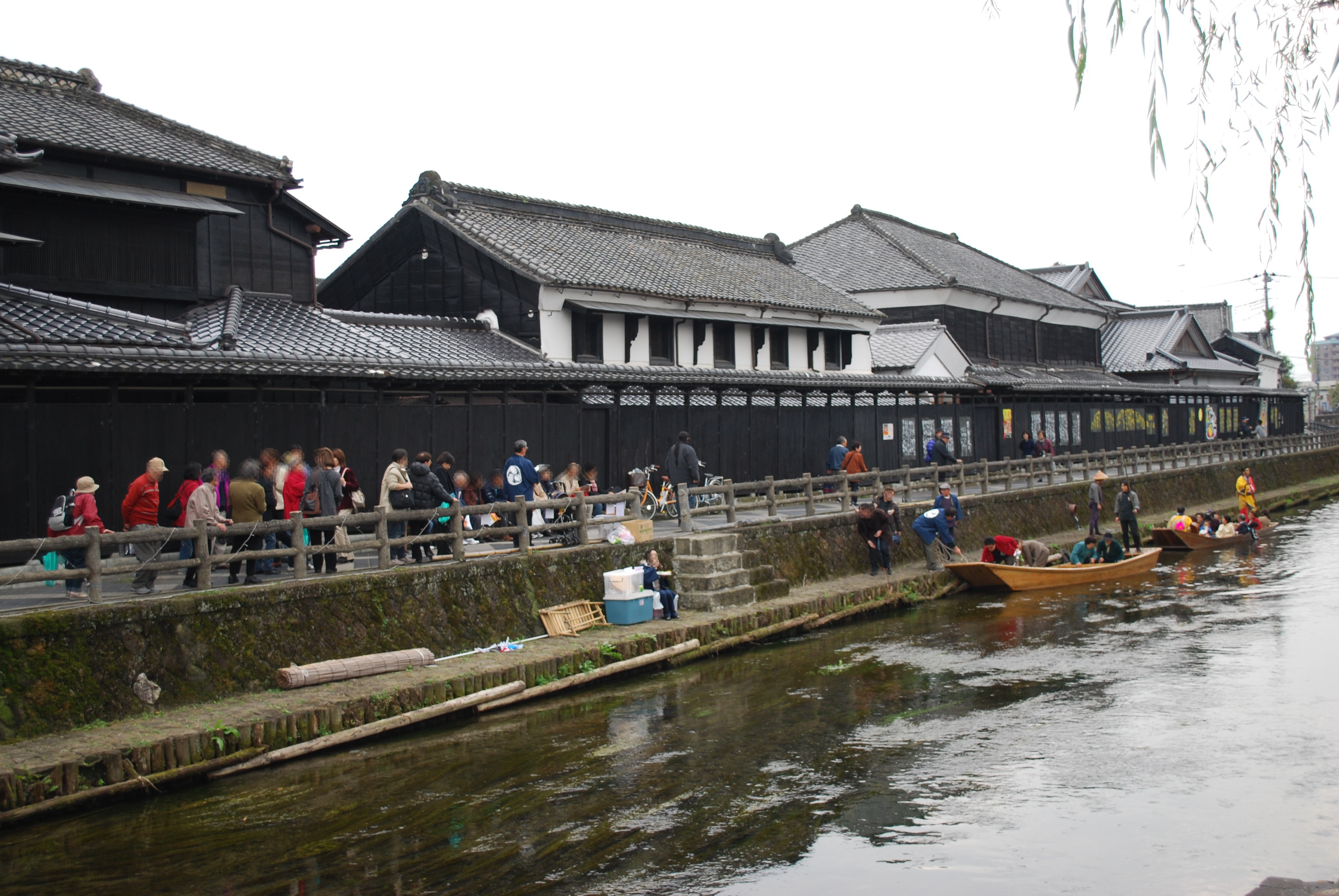
Traditional kura (storehouses) in Tochigi

Tochigi (栃木市, Tochigi-shi (Note: Japanese pronunciation: [tó̞.c̟͡ɕì.ɡ̟ʲì, -ŋ̟ʲì, tò̞.c̟͡ɕí.ɡ̟ʲí(.ɕì), -ŋ̟ʲí(.ɕì)], locally [tò̞.c̟͡ɕí.ŋ̟ʲí])) is a city located in Tochigi Prefecture, in the northern Kantō region of Japan. As of 1 June 2023, the city had an estimated population of 151,842 in 66,018 households, and a population density of 458 persons per km^{2}. The total area of the city is 331.50 square kilometres (127.99 sq mi). Because the city escaped war damage during World War II, many historical temples, traditional shops and kura (Japanese traditional storehouses) remain in the city center. The city was awarded the "Utsukushii-machinami Taisho" prize from the Ministry of Land, Infrastructure, Transport and Tourism in 2009.

== Geography ==
Tochigi is located in the very southern portion of Tochigi Prefecture, bordering on Ibaraki Prefecture and Gunma Prefecture to the southwest. The city is located in the northern part of the Kanto plain, with a mountain range extending in the northern part of the city. The Tomawa River runs through the city center, the Oshigawa River runs through the eastern part, and the Watarase River runs through the southern part. At the confluence of these three rivers is the Yanaka Reservoir, which is used for sailboating and windsurfing. It was designated a Ramsar Site in June 2012.

== Surrounding municipalities ==
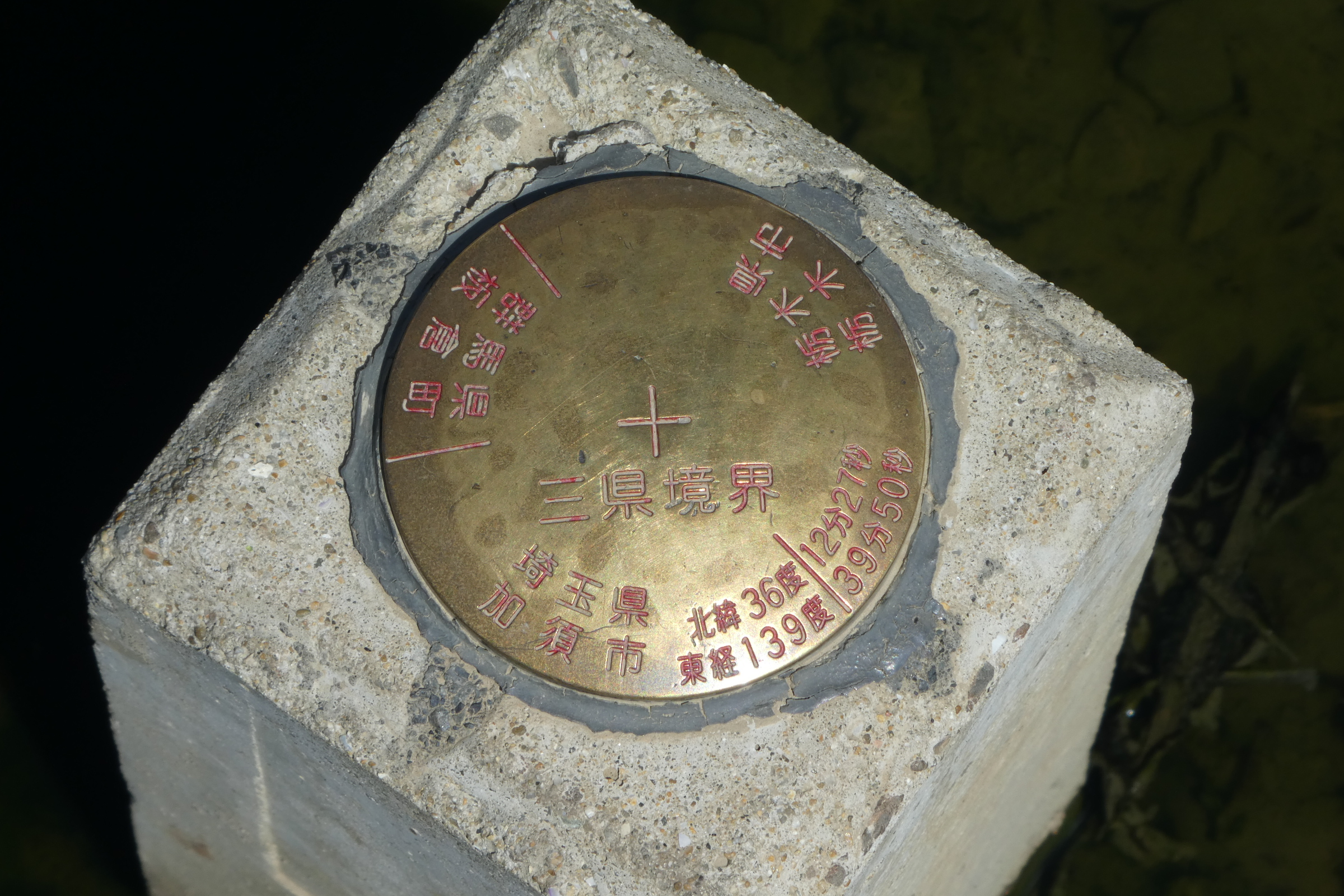
A point site of Tochigi-Gunma-Saitama prefecture border

Ibaraki Prefecture

- Koga

Gunma Prefecture

- Itakura

Saitama Prefecture

- Kazo

Tochigi Prefecture

- Kanuma
- Mibu
- Nogi
- Oyama
- Sano
- Shimotsuke

== Climate ==
Tochigi has a humid subtropical climate (Köppen Cfa) characterized by warm summers and cold winters with heavy snowfall. The average annual temperature in Tochigi is 14.2 °C. The average annual rainfall is 1325 mm with September as the wettest month. The temperatures are highest on average in August, at around 26.5 °C, and lowest in January, at around 2.9 °C.

== Demographics ==
Per Japanese census data, the population of Tochigi has remained relatively steady over the past 50 years.

Historical population
Year	Pop.	±%
1920	110,209	—
1930	117,833	+6.9%
1940	120,583	+2.3%
1950	156,029	+29.4%
1960	147,499	−5.5%
1970	152,125	+3.1%
1980	168,423	+10.7%
1990	174,717	+3.7%
2000	171,755	−1.7%
2010	164,033	−4.5%
2020	155,549	−5.2%
Source: Statistics Bureau of Japan

== History ==
In the Edo period, Tochigi prospered from its location on the Uzumagawa River, which connected with the Tone River to Edo. Envoys using the Reiheishi Way sent from the Imperial Court going to Shrines and Temples of Nikkō stayed at the lodging area in the city. Most of the area was formerly tenryō territory controlled directly by the Tokugawa shogunate; however, the minor feudal domain of Fukiake Domain was located within the borders of modern city of Tochigi.

Following the Meiji Restoration and the creation of Tochigi Prefecture, Tochigi Town was the prefectural capital from 1871 until its relocation to Utsunomiya in 1884. On April 1, 1937, Tochigi was elevated to city status.

On September 30, 1954, Tochigi absorbed the villages of Ōmiya, Minagawa, Fukiage, and Terao (all from Shimotsuga District). This was followed by the village of Kōō (from Shimotsuga District) on March 31, 1957. Tochigi hosted its first film festival, the Kuranomachikado, or, "Eizo Film Festival" from October 5, 2007, to October 8, 2007.

On March 29, 2010, Tochigi absorbed the towns of Fujioka, Ōhira and Tsuga (Shimotsuga District). This was followed by the town of Nishikata (from Kamitsuga District) on October 1, 2011, and the town of Iwafune (from Shimotsuga District) on April 5, 2014.

== Government ==
Tochigi has a mayor-council form of government with a directly elected mayor and a unicameral city legislature of 30 members. Tochigi contributes four members to the Tochigi Prefectural Assembly. In terms of national politics, the city is divided between the Tochigi 2nd district, Tochigi 4th district, and Tochigi 5th district of the lower house of the Diet of Japan.

== Economy ==
Tochigi city is a regional commercial center, and has a mixed local economy. Food processing, automotive parts and light manufacturing dominated the industrial sector. Isuzu has maintained a factory since 1961. In 2010, the city ranked first in the number of farming families in the prefecture.

== Education ==
- Kokugakuin Tochigi Junior College
- Tochigi has 29 public primary schools and 15 public middle schools operated by the city government. The city has eight public high schools operated by the Tochigi Prefectural Board of Education. The prefecture also operated one special education school for the handicapped.

== Sports ==
Tochigi is represented in the J. League of football by its local club Tochigi City FC.

== Transportation ==
=== Railway ===
JR East – Ryōmō Line

- Tochigi - Ōhirashita - Iwafune

Tobu Railway – Tobu Nikko Line

- Fujioka - Shizuwa - Shin-Ōhirashita - Tochigi - Shin-Tochigi - Kassemba - Ienaka - Tōbu Kanasaki

Tobu Railway – Tobu Utsunomiya Line

- Shin-Tochigi - Yashū-Hirakawa - Yashū-Ōtsuka

=== Highway ===
- Tōhoku Expressway – Sano-Fujioka Interchange, Iwafune Junction, Tochigi Interchange, Tochigi-Tsuga Junction, Tsuga-Nishikata Parking Area
- Kita-Kantō Expressway – Iwafune Junction, Tochigi-Tsuga Junction, Tsuga Interchange
- National Route 50
- National Route 293

== Local attractions ==
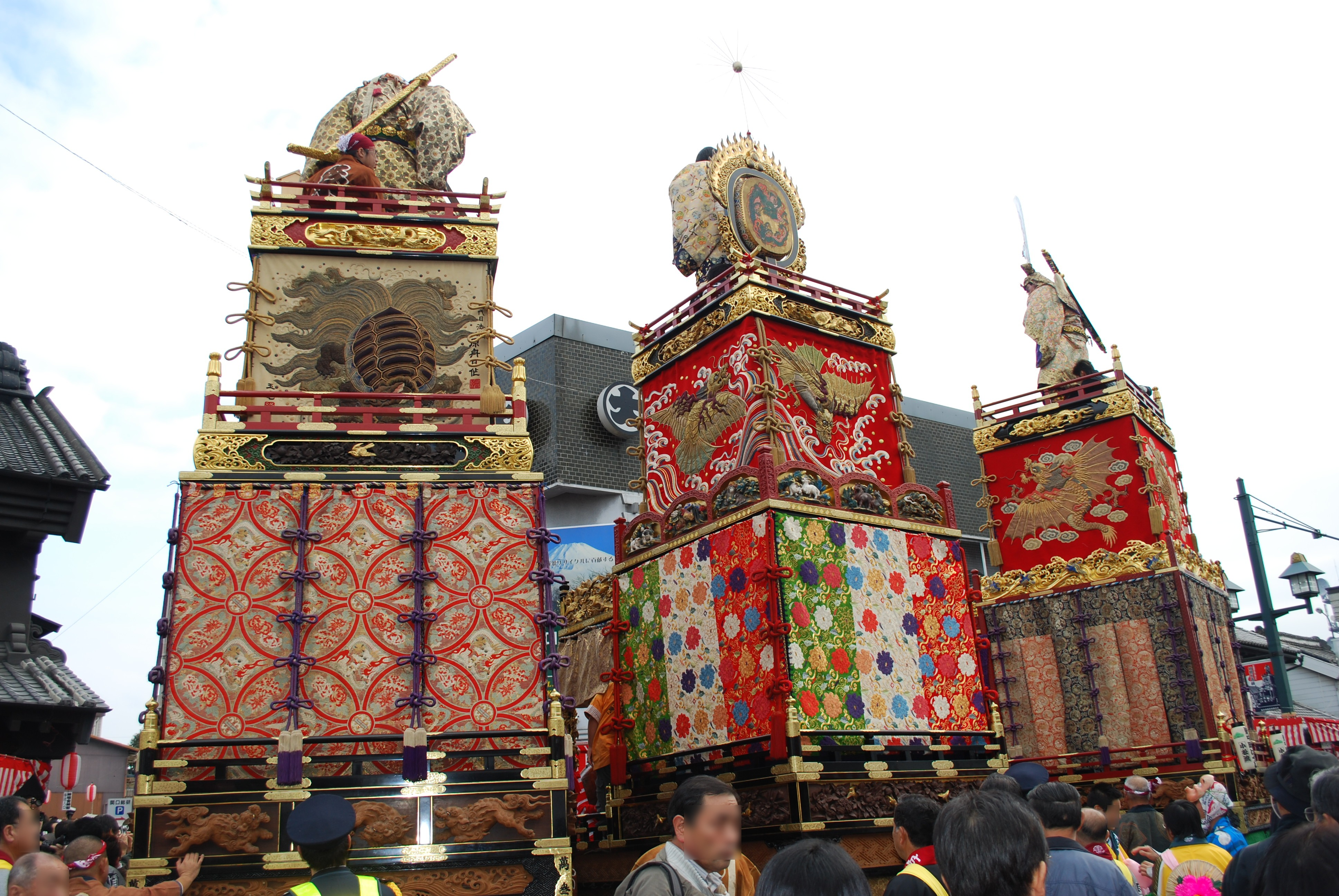
Tochigi Autumn Festival on November

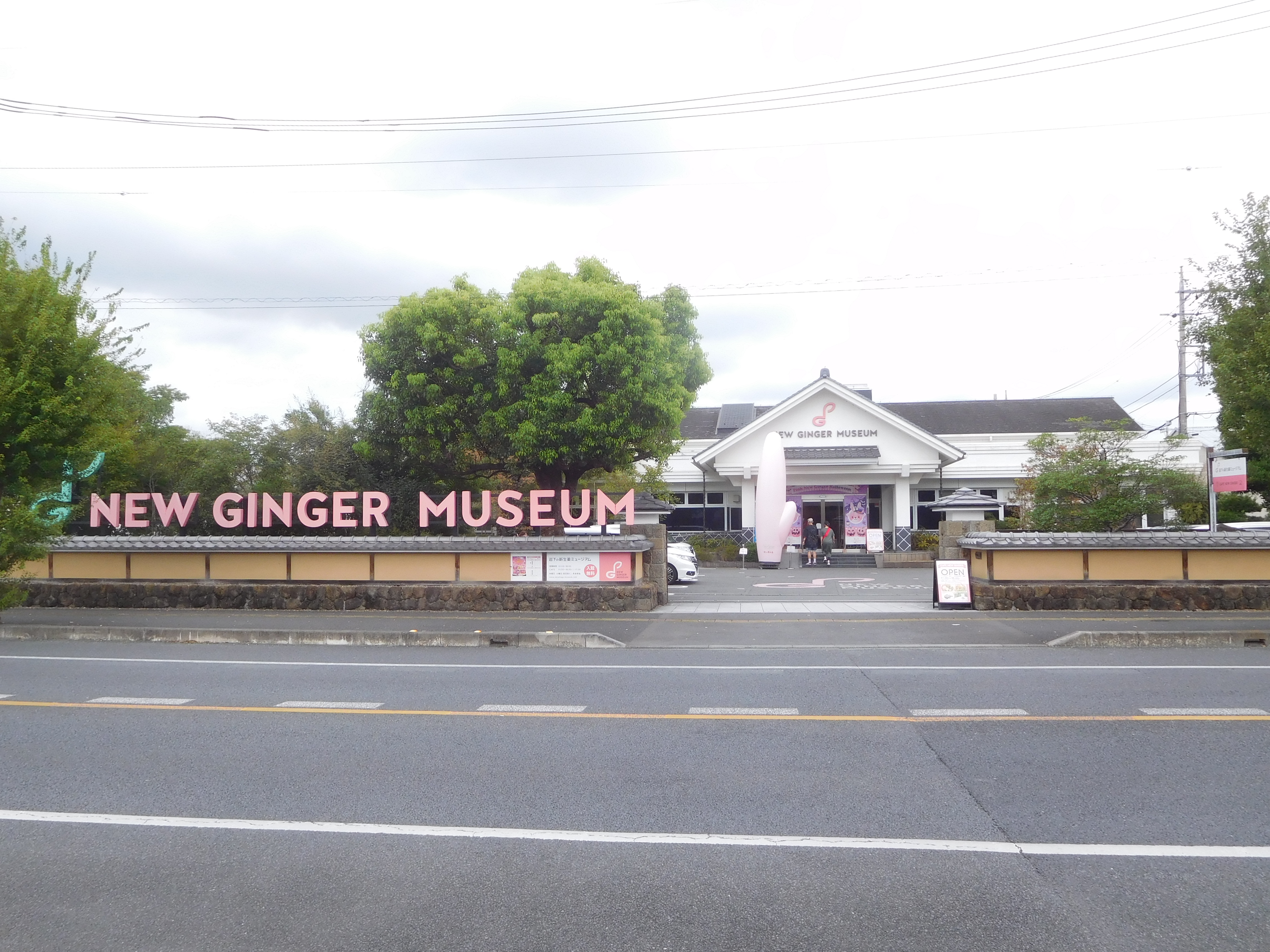
Tochigi Ginger Museum

- Tochigi City Literature Museum, a museum housed within the former Tochigi City Hall building, which features rotating exibits.
- Iwashita New Ginger Museum, a museum dedicated to Iwashita Young Ginger, a type of pickled ginger, commonly eaten across Japan.
- Kuranomachi Promenade, a riverside area lined with traditional storehouses from the Edo and Meiji periods
- Ashikaga Flower Park
- the sound of Tree frogs in Ajisai-zaka, Mount Ohirasan in Tochigi have been designated as one of the 100 Soundscapes of Japan by the Ministry of the Environment
- Tochigi–Gunma–Saitama border

== Sister cities ==
- Evansville, Indiana, United States

== Notable people from Tochigi ==
- Toshio Furukawa, voice actor
- Koji Hachisuka, professional football player
- Kosuke Hagino, swimmer
- Yuriko Handa, Olympic volleyball athlete
- Ryoji Isaoka, Olympic weightlifter
- Tanaka Isson, artist
- Toshiaki Kawada, professional wrestler
- Tochigiyama Moriya, sumo wrestler
- Hitomi, jpop singer
- Namihei Odaira, founder of Hitachi
- Hirokazu Sawamura, professional baseball player
- Toyo Shibata, poet
- Takuya Takei, professional football player
- Takayuki Terauchi, professional baseball player
- Shingo Tomita, professional football player
- Tomoko Yamaguchi, actress
- Yūzō Yamamoto, author
