= Fujioka Station (Tochigi) =

Railway station in Tochigi, Tochigi Prefecture, Japan

TN08 Fujioka Station 藤岡駅
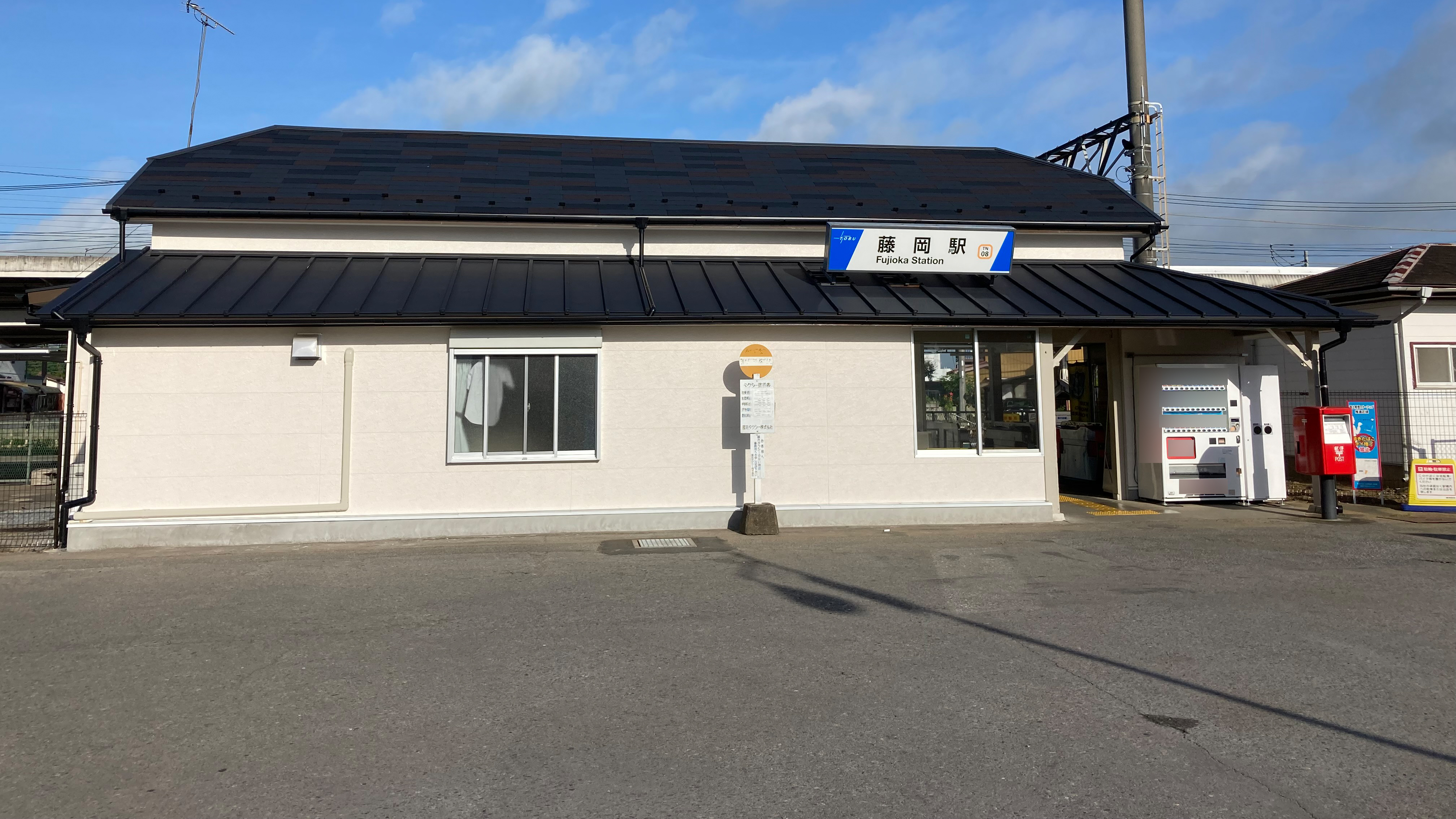
- Fujioka Station in August 2021

General information
- Location: 5078-2 Fujioka, Tochigi-shi, Tochigi-ken 323-1104; Japan
- Coordinates: 36.2556°N 139.6453°E
- Operator: Tobu Railway
- Line: Tōbu Nikkō Line
- Distance: 29.5 km from Tōbu-Dōbutsu-Kōen
- Platforms: 1 island platform

Other information
- Station code: TN-08
- Website: Official website

History
- Opened: 1 April 1929

Passengers
- FY2020: 1631 daily

Services
Preceding station	Tobu Railway	Following station
Itakura Tōyōdai-mae TN07 towards Tōbu-Dōbutsu-Kōen	Nikkō Line Local	Shizuwa TN09 towards Tōbu–Nikkō
Location
- Location within Tochigi Prefecture Location within Japan

Fujioka Station (藤岡駅, Fujioka-eki) is a railway station in the city of Tochigi, Tochigi, Japan, operated by the private railway operator Tōbu Railway. The station is numbered "TN-08".

== Lines ==
Fujioka Station is served by Tōbu Nikkō Line, and is 29.5 km from the starting point of the line at Tōbu-Dōbutsu-Kōen.

== Station layout ==
This station consists of a single island platform serving two tracks, connected to the station building by an underground passageway.

=== Platforms ===
1	■ Tōbu Nikkō Line	for Minami-Kurihashi and Tōbu-Dōbutsu-Kōen
2	■ Tōbu Nikkō Line	for Shin-Tochigi and Tōbu-Nikkō

== History ==
Fujioka Station opened on 1 April 1929.

From 17 March 2012, station numbering was introduced on all Tōbu lines, with Fujioka Station becoming "TN-08".

== Passenger statistics ==
In fiscal 2019, the station was used by an average of 1631 passengers daily (boarding passengers only).

== Surrounding area ==
- former Fujioka town hall
- Fujioka Post Office

== See also ==
- List of railway stations in Japan
