= Kokubunji, Tochigi =

Dissolved municipality in Tochigi prefecture, Japan

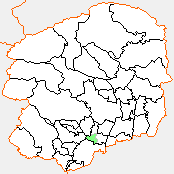
Map of Kokubunji, Tochigi

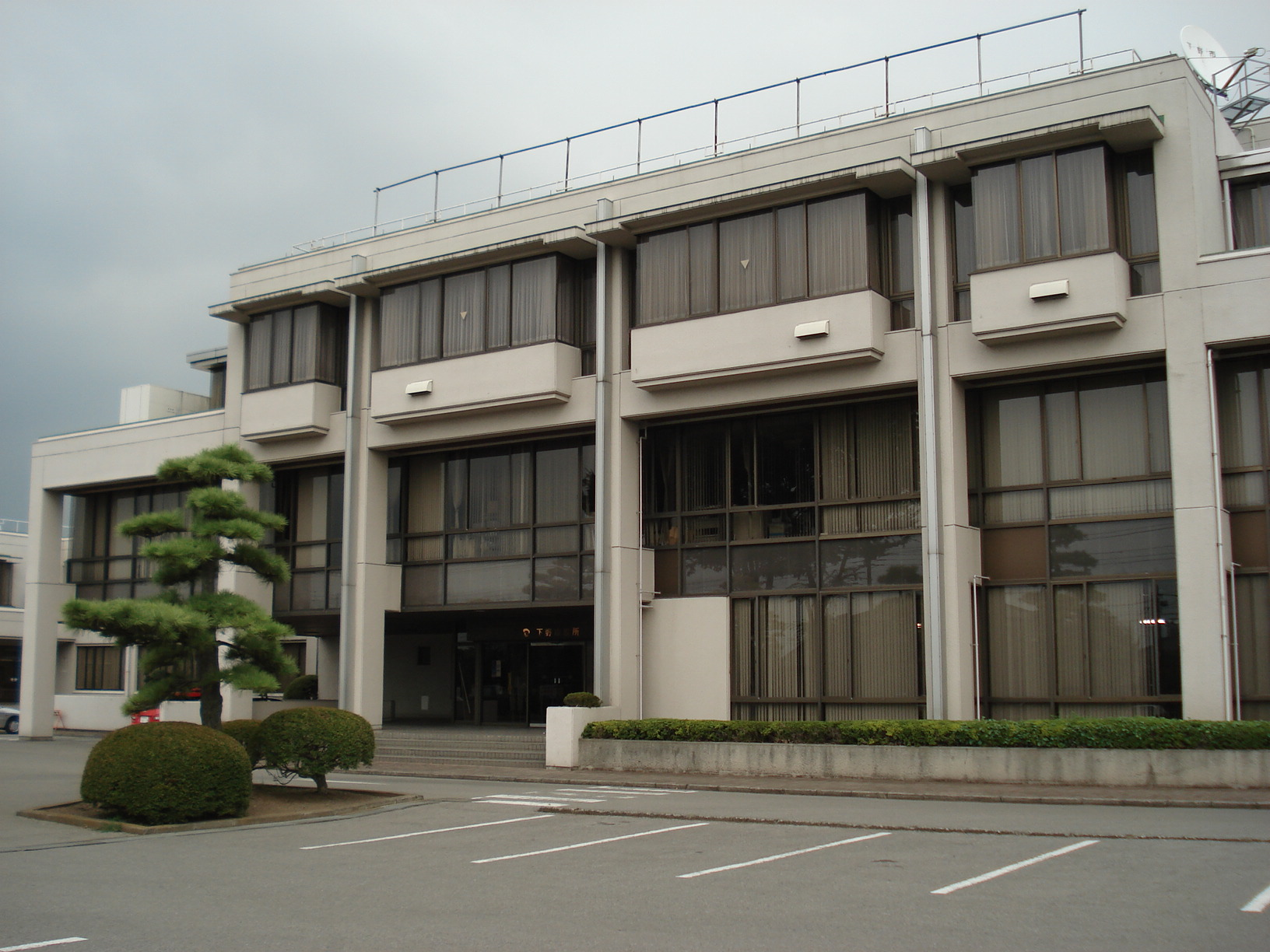
former Kokubunji Town Hall

Kokubunji (国分寺町, Kokubunji-machi) was a town located in Shimotsuga District, Tochigi Prefecture, Japan.

As of 2003, the town had an estimated population of 17,373 and a density of 835.24 persons per km^{2}. The total area was 20.80 km^{2}.

On January 10, 2006, Kokubunji, along with the town of Minamikawachi (from Kawachi District), and the town of Ishibashi (also from Shimotsuga District), was merged to create the new city of Shimotsuke.
