= Tanaka Isson =

- Tanaka Isson
- Born: Tanaka Takashi; 22 July 1908; Tochigi, Tochigi, Japan
- Died: 11 September 1977 (aged 69); Amami Ōshima, Kagoshima Prefecture, Japan
- Known for: Painter
- Movement: Nihonga

Tanaka Takashi (田中 孝, 22 July 1908 – 11 September 1977), known by his art name Tanaka Isson (田中 一村), was a Japanese Nihonga painter from the Shōwa period noted for his flower-and-bird paintings of the Amami Islands.

== Biography ==
He was born in what is now Tochigi City, Tochigi Prefecture, as the son of a local sculptor. Interested in art at an early age, he won his first award for a watercolor painting at the age of 7. In 1926, he enrolled in the Tokyo Bijutsu Gakko (the predecessor to the Tokyo National University of Fine Arts and Music), where he specialized in Nihonga painting, but left after a few months without graduating due to his father's illness and lack of funds.

From 1938, he lived at various locations in Chiba Prefecture, and although his future initially seemed promising, his isolation from the mainstream art circles meant that he had difficulty in establishing a name. He was forced to work at numerous odd jobs to stay alive, while attempting to paint on the side. In the years of World War II, he endured illness and poverty. It was only in 1947, in an exhibition sponsored by Kawabata Ryūshi, that his name became known to the art world.

In 1958, at the age of 50, he decided to relocate to Amami Ōshima, where he found employment at a silk factory, earning just enough for a frugal life. He continued to paint, using the nature of Amami Ōshima for inspiration, and his output through the 1960s and early 1970s was prolific.

Tanaka Isson died in 1977 of a heart attack at the age of 69. After his death, his life and the style of his works were compared with that of Paul Gauguin on the Japanese national television (NHK)'s Sunday Art Museum program, and in 2001, a memorial art museum was established in his honor near the airport on Amami Ōshima. In 2018 his work was exhibited outside Japan for the first time.

== Philately ==
One of Isson's paintings (Amami Forest, palm trees and bougainvillea) was selected by Japan Post for a commemorative postage stamp in 2003, commemorating the 50th anniversary of the reversion of the Amami islands to Japanese administration.
