= Ōhira, Tochigi =

Dissolved municipality in Tochigi prefecture, Japan

Coordinates: 36°20′N 139°42′E

Location of Ōhira in Tochigi Prefecture

Ōhira (大平町, Ōhira-machi) was a town located in Shimotsuga District, Tochigi Prefecture, Japan.

As of 2003, the town had an estimated population of 28,368 and a density of 712.76 persons per km^{2}. The total area was 39.80 km^{2}.

On March 29, 2010, Ōhira, along with the towns of Fujioka and Tsuga (all from Shimotsuga District), was merged into the expanded city of Tochigi.
