= Fujioka, Tochigi =

Dissolved municipality in Tochigi prefecture, Japan

Coordinates: 36°16′N 139°39′E

Location of Fujioka in Tochigi Prefecture

Fujioka (藤岡町, Fujioka-machi) was a town located in Shimotsuga District, Tochigi Prefecture, Japan.

As of 2003, the town had an estimated population of 18,472 and a density of 305.57 persons per km^{2}. The total area was 60.45 km^{2}.

On March 29, 2010, Fujioka, along with the towns of Ōhira and Tsuga (all from Shimotsuga District), was merged into the expanded city of Tochigi.

== Famous people ==
- Toshiaki Kawada, All Japan Pro Wrestling champion
- Tochigiyama Moriya, 27th yokozuna in sumo
