= Ashikaga Domain =

Feudal domain of Edo Japan

Ashikaga Domain 足利藩
- under Tokugawa shogunate Japan
- 1688–1871
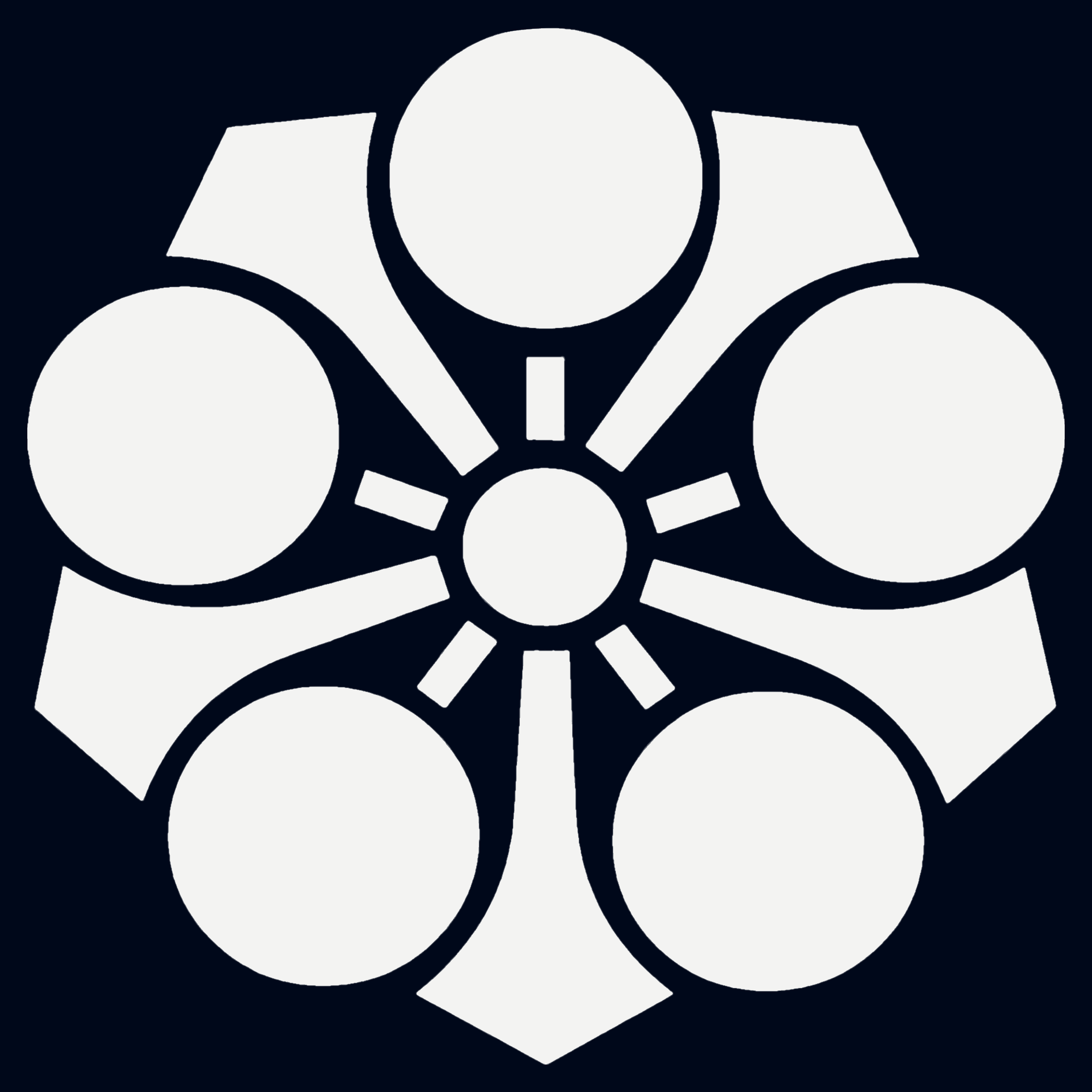
- Mon of the Honjo clan
- Capital: Ashikaga jin'ya
  - Type: Daimyō
- Historical era: Edo period
  - Established: 1688
  - Disestablished: 1871
- Today part of: Tochigi Prefecture

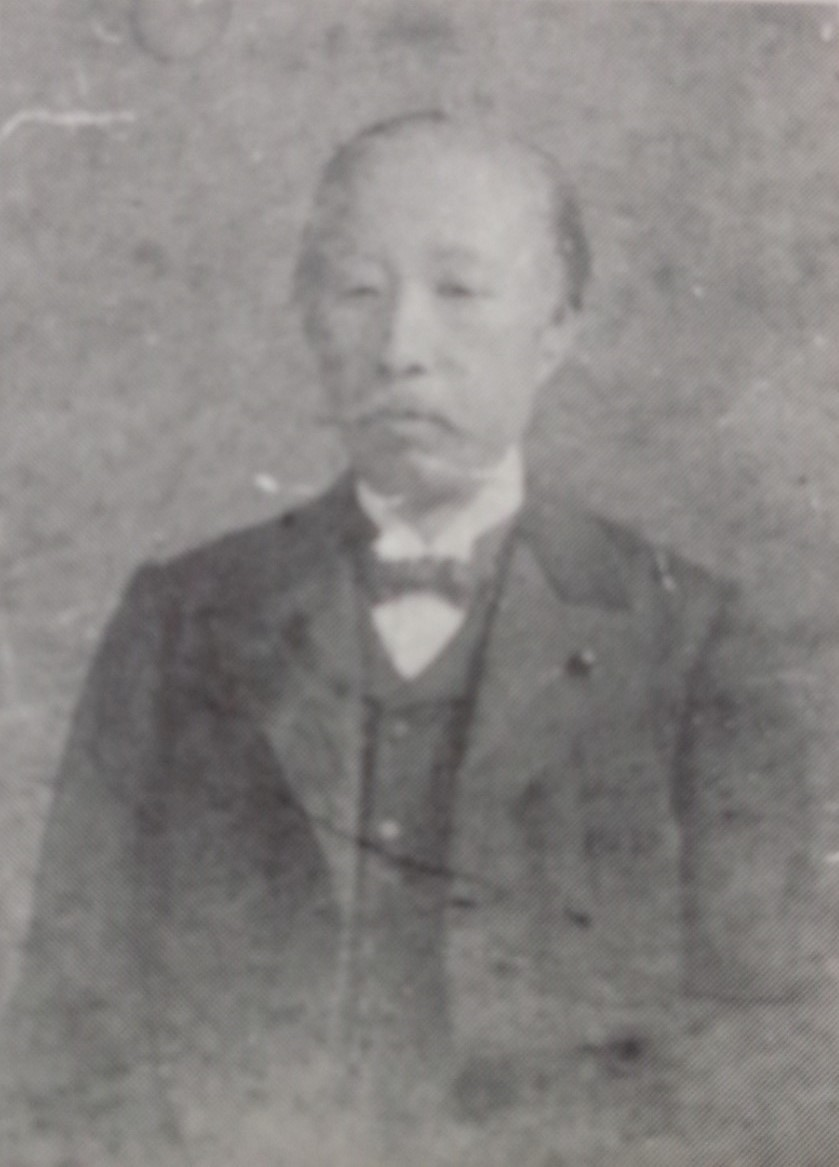
Toda Tadayuki, final daimyo of Ashikaga Domain

Ashikaga Domain (足利藩, Ashikaga-han) was a feudal domain under the Tokugawa shogunate of Edo period Japan, located in Shimotsuke Province (modern-day Tochigi Prefecture), Japan. It was centered on Ashikaga jin'ya in what is now part of the city of Ashikaga. Ashikaga was ruled through most of its history by a junior branch of the Toda clan.

== History ==
The Ashikaga clan which ruled Japan during the Muromachi period established a branch government at their ancestral homeland of Ashikaga shōen in Shimotsuke to govern the Kantō region. However, by the late Sengoku period, this branch of the Ashikaga were very much weakened by the constant battles against the Uesugi clan, Takeda clan and Odawara Hojo clan, and were eventually dispossessed after the 1590 Battle of Odawara.

In 1688, Shōgun Tokugawa Tsunayoshi elevated his mother’s half-brother, Honjō Munesuke, to the rank of daimyō and assigned him a 10,000 koku territory on the former Ashikaga lands. He was later awarded an increase to 20,000 koku before being transferred to Kasama Domain in Hitachi Province in 1692.

In 1705, despite his somewhat advanced age, the hatamoto Toda Tadatoki received an additional 3000 koku in addition to his existing 8000 koku by Shōgun Tokugawa Ienobu as a reward for his long service, and Ashikaga domain was revived. The Toda continued to rule Ashikaga until the end of the Edo period. The final daimyō, Toda Tadayuki served the Tokugawa shogunate as Rikugun bugyō, but later switched allegiance to the pro-imperial cause in the Boshin war of the Meiji restoration.

After the abolition of the han system in July 1871, Ashikaga Domain became part of Tochigi Prefecture.

The domain had a population of 6,826 people in 1473 households, of which 383 were samurai in 106 households per a census in 1870.

== Holdings at the end of the Edo period ==
As with most domains in the han system, Ashikaga Domain consisted of several discontinuous territories calculated to provide the assigned kokudaka, based on periodic cadastral surveys and projected agricultural yields.

- Shimotsuke Province
  - 7 villages in Tsuga District
  - 3 villages in Yanada District
  - 9villages in Ashikaga District
- Musashi Province
  - 5 villages in Saitama District

== List of daimyō ==
#	Name	Tenure	Courtesy title	Court Rank	kokudaka
Honjō clan (fudai) 1688–1692
1	Honjō Munesuke (本庄宗資)	1688–1692	Inaba-no-kami (因幡守); Jiju (侍従)	Junior 4th Rank, Lower Grade (従五位下)	10,000 –>20,000 koku
tenryō 1692–1705
Toda clan (fudai) 1705–1871
1	Toda Takatoki (戸田忠時)	1705–1708	Ōi-no-kami (大炊頭)	Junior 4th Rank, Lower Grade (従五位下)	11,000 koku
2	Toda Takasono (戸田忠囿)	1708–1732	Osumi-no-kami (大隅守)	Junior 5th Rank, Lower Grade (従五位下)	11,000 koku
3	Toda Takataka (戸田忠位)	1732–1736	Izumi-no-kami (出雲守)	Junior 5th Rank, Lower Grade (従五位下)	11,000 koku
4	Toda Takatoki (戸田忠言)	1736–1774	Ōi-no-kami (大炊頭)	Junior 5th Rank, Lower Grade (従五位下)	11,000 koku
5	Toda Takatoka (戸田忠喬)	1775–1821	Ōi-no-kami (大炊頭)	Junior 5th Rank, Lower Grade (従五位下)	11,000 koku
6	Toda Takatoki (戸田忠禄)	1821–1847	Nagato-no-kami (長門守)	Junior 5th Rank, Lower Grade (従五位下)	11,000 koku
7	Toda Takafumi (戸田忠文)	1847–1856	Ōi-no-kami (大炊頭)	Junior 5th Rank, Lower Grade (従五位下)	11,000 koku
8	Toda Tadayuki (戸田忠行)	1856–1871	Nagato-no-kami (長門守)	Junior 5th Rank, Lower Grade (従五位下)	11,000 koku
