= Ishibashi, Tochigi =

Dissolved municipality in Tochigi prefecture, Japan

Coordinates: 36.433°N 139.867°E

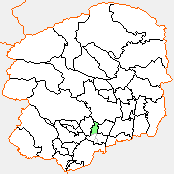
Map of Ishibashi, Tochigi

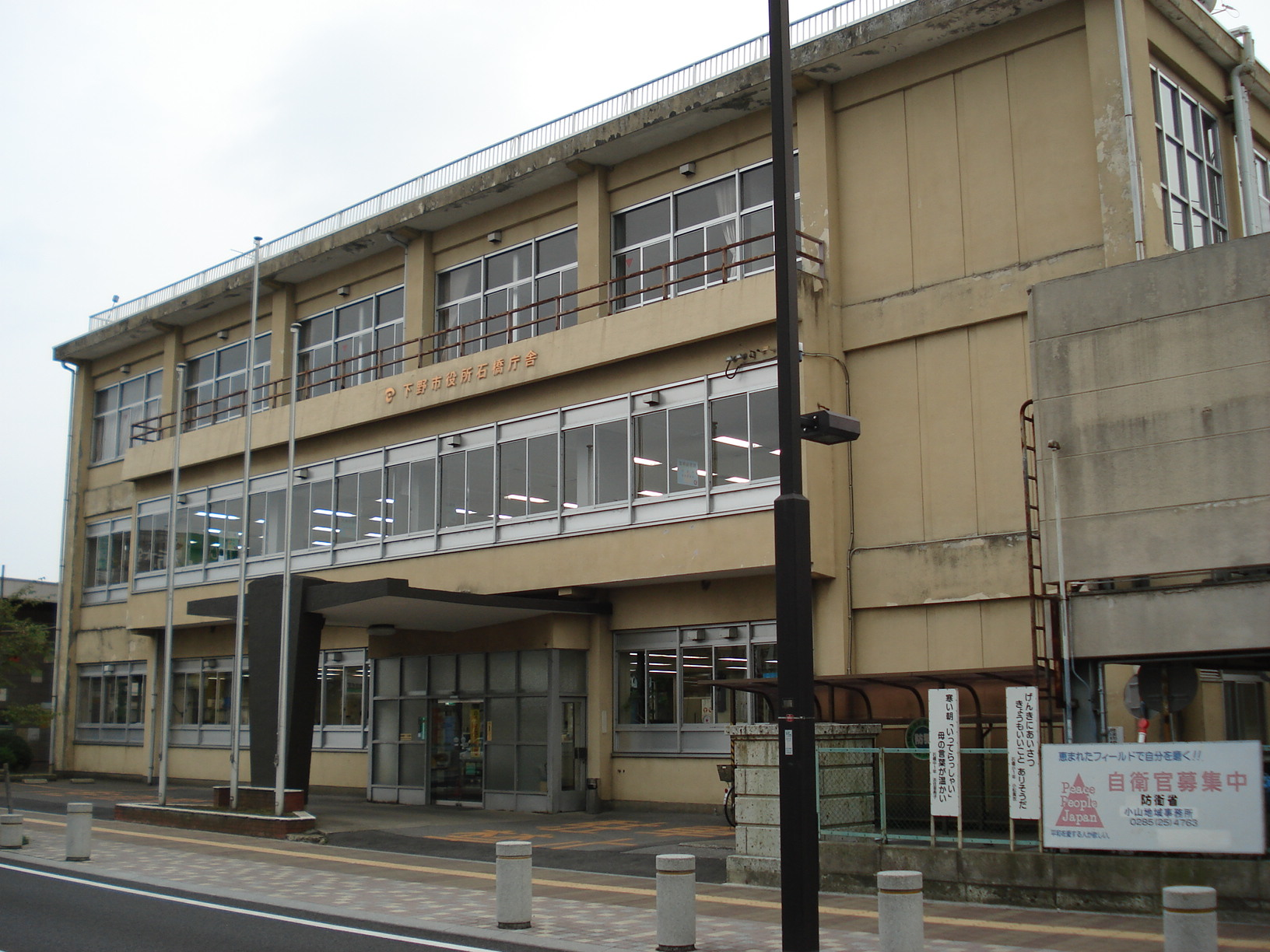
former Ishibashi Town Hall

Ishibashi (石橋町, Ishibashi-machi) was a town located in Shimotsuga District, Tochigi Prefecture, Japan.

As of 2003, the town had an estimated population of 20,283 and a density of 904.28 persons per km^{2}. The total area was 22.43 km^{2}.

On January 10, 2006, Ishibashi, along with the town of Minamikawachi (from Kawachi District), and the town of Kokubunji (also from Shimotsuga District), was merged to create the new city of Shimotsuke.
