= Tochigi 5th district =

Legislative district of Japan

- Parliamentary constituency for the Japanese House of Representatives
- Numbered map of Tochigi Prefecture single-member districts
- Prefecture: Tochigi
- Proportional District: Northern Kanto
- Electorate: 346,604

Current constituency
- Created: 1994
- Seats: One
- Party: Liberal Democratic
- Representative: Toshimitsu Motegi
- Municipalities: Ashikaga, Sano, and Tochigi.

Tochigi 5th district (栃木県第5区, Tochigi-ken dai-goku or simply 栃木5区, Tochigi-ken goku) is a single-member constituency of the House of Representatives in the national Diet of Japan located in Tochigi Prefecture.

== List of representatives ==
Election	Representative	Party	Notes
1996	Toshimitsu Motegi	Liberal Democratic	
2000	Toshimitsu Motegi	Liberal Democratic	
2003	Toshimitsu Motegi	Liberal Democratic	
2005	Toshimitsu Motegi	Liberal Democratic	
2009	Toshimitsu Motegi	Liberal Democratic	
2012	Toshimitsu Motegi	Liberal Democratic	
2014	Toshimitsu Motegi	Liberal Democratic	
2017	Toshimitsu Motegi	Liberal Democratic	
2021	Toshimitsu Motegi	Liberal Democratic	
2024	Toshimitsu Motegi	Liberal Democratic	
2026	Toshimitsu Motegi	Liberal Democratic	

== Results ==
=== 2026 ===
2026 general election
Party	Candidate	Votes	%	±%
LDP	Toshimitsu Motegi	110,743	68.2	▲5.2
DPP	Takafumi Terada	19,626	12.1	
Sanseitō	Yōsuke Miyamoto	16,713	10.3	
JCP	Keiko Okamura	20,098	9.4	▼6.5
Registered electors		337,159		
Turnout		162,397	49.92	▲1.33
LDP hold				

=== 2024 ===
2024 general election
Party	Candidate	Votes	%	±%
LDP	Toshimitsu Motegi	99,897	63.0	▼14.4
JCP	Keiko Okamura	25,203	15.9	▼6.7
Ishin	Kanji Yakō	20,098	12.7	
Independent	Yōzō Kameyama	13,447	8.5	
Registered electors		341,785		
Turnout			48.59	▼2.40
LDP hold				

=== 2021 ===
2021 general election
Party	Candidate	Votes	%	±%
LDP	Toshimitsu Motegi	108,380	77.36	
JCP	Keiko Okamura	31,713	22.64	
Majority		76,667	54.72	
Turnout		140,093		
LDP hold				

=== 2017 ===
2017 general election
Party	Candidate	Votes	%	±%
LDP	Toshimitsu Motegi	89,403	61.95	
Kibō no Tō	Minoru Ōmamiuda	41,438	28.71	New
JCP	Hitoshi Kawakami	13,485	9.34	
Majority		47,965	33.24	
Turnout		144,326		
LDP hold				

=== 2014 ===
2014 general election
Party	Candidate	Votes	%	±%
LDP	Toshimitsu Motegi	101,514	76.54	
JCP	Hitoshi Kawakami	31,119	23.46	
Majority		70,395	53.08	
Turnout		132,633		
LDP hold				

=== 2012 ===
2012 general election
Party	Candidate	Votes	%	±%
LDP	Toshimitsu Motegi	101,533	67.31	
Your	Yoshitada Tomioka	38,626	25.60	New
JCP	Hitoshi Kawakami	10,696	7.09	
Majority		62,907	41.71	
Turnout		150,855		
LDP hold				

=== 2009 ===
2009 general election
Party	Candidate	Votes	%	±%
LDP	Toshimitsu Motegi	101,383	51.67	
Democratic	Yoshitada Tomioka	92,592	47.19	
Happiness Realization	Kanemitsu Mori	2,226	1.13	New
Majority		8,791	4.48	
Turnout		196,201		
LDP hold				
