= Tsuga, Tochigi =

Dissolved municipality in Tochigi prefecture, Japan

Coordinates: 36°26′N 139°45′E

Location of Tsuga in Tochigi Prefecture

Tsuga (都賀町, Tsuga-machi) was a town located in Shimotsuga District, Tochigi Prefecture, Japan.

As of 2003, the town had an estimated population of 13,635 and a density of 446.76 persons per km^{2}. The total area was 30.52 km^{2}.

On March 29, 2010, Tsuga, along with the towns of Fujioka and Ōhira (all from Shimotsuga District), was merged into the expanded city of Tochigi.
