= Iwafune, Tochigi =

Iwafune 岩舟町
- Former municipality
- Location of Iwafune in Tochigi Prefecture

- Location in Japan
- Coordinates: 36°19′N 139°39′E
- Country: Japan
- Region: Kantō
- Prefecture: Tochigi Prefecture
- District: Shimotsuga
- Merged: April 5, 2014 (now part of Tochigi)

Area
  - Total: 46.74 km^{2} (18.05 sq mi)

Population (2013)
  - Total: 18,152
  - Density: 388.4/km^{2} (1,006/sq mi)
- Time zone: UTC+09:00 (JST)
- Website: www.town.iwafune.tochigi.jp

Iwafune (岩舟町, Iwafune-machi) was a town located in Shimotsuga District, Tochigi Prefecture, Japan.

As of 2013, the town had an estimated population of 18,152 and a density of 390 persons per km^{2}. The total area was 46.74 km^{2}.

On April 5, 2014, Iwafune was merged into the expanded city of Tochigi.

== Transportation ==
=== Railway ===
- JR East: Ryōmō Line (Iwafune Station)
- Tobu Railway: Nikkō Line (Shizuwa Station)

=== Road ===
- Route 50
