= Toshimitsu Motegi =

Japanese politician (born 1955)

- 茂木 敏充
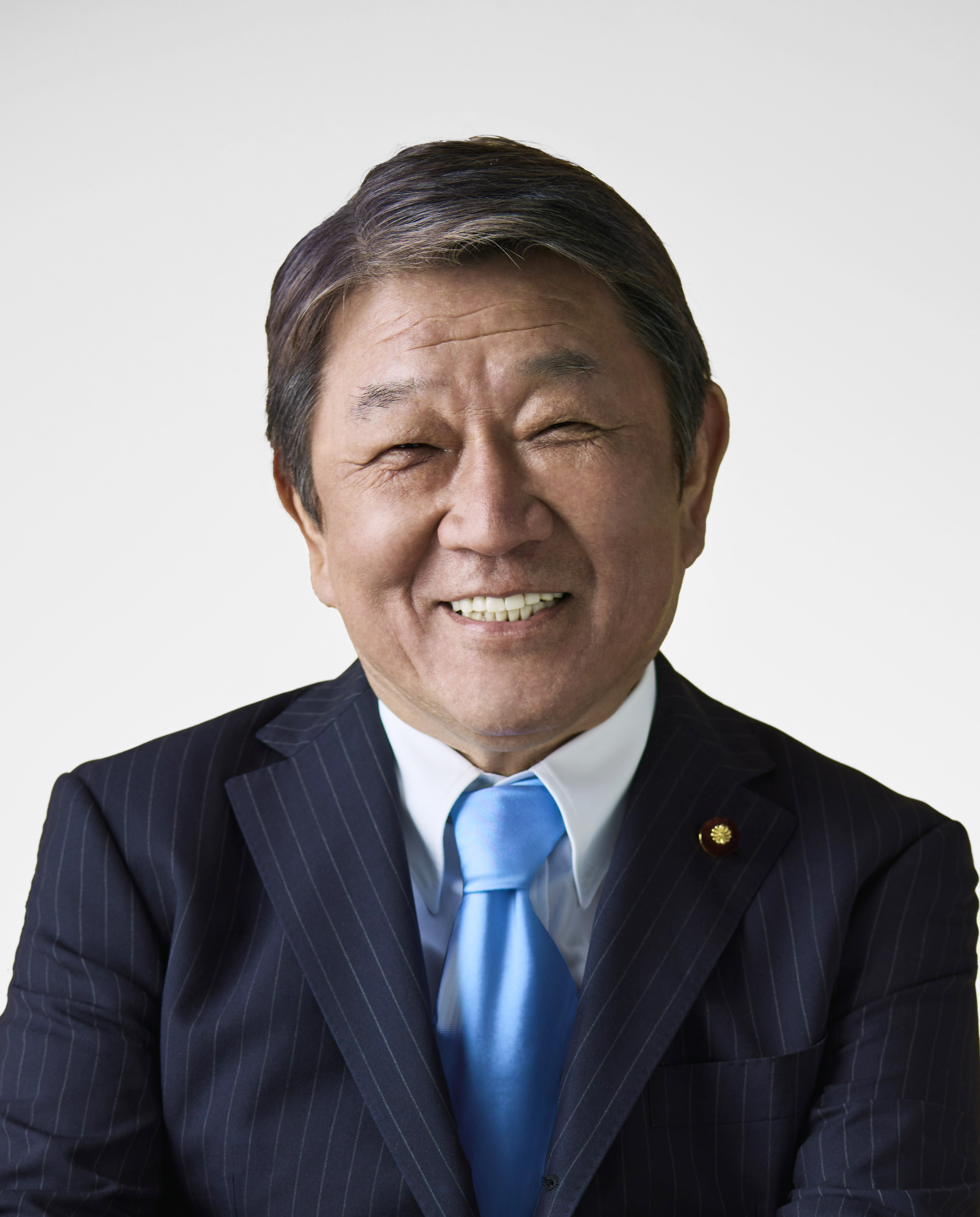
- Official portrait, 2024

Minister for Foreign Affairs
- Incumbent
- Assumed office 21 October 2025
- Prime Minister: Sanae Takaichi
- Preceded by: Takeshi Iwaya
- In office 11 September 2019 – 4 November 2021
- Prime Minister: Shinzo Abe; Yoshihide Suga; Fumio Kishida
- Preceded by: Tarō Kōno
- Succeeded by: Fumio Kishida

Secretary-General of the Liberal Democratic Party
- In office 4 November 2021 – 30 September 2024
- President: Fumio Kishida
- Vice President: Tarō Asō
- Preceded by: Akira Amari
- Succeeded by: Hiroshi Moriyama

Minister of State for Economic and Fiscal Policy
- In office 3 August 2017 – 11 September 2019
- Prime Minister: Shinzo Abe
- Preceded by: Nobuteru Ishihara
- Succeeded by: Yasutoshi Nishimura

Minister of Economy, Trade and Industry
- In office 26 December 2012 – 3 September 2014
- Prime Minister: Shinzo Abe
- Preceded by: Yukio Edano
- Succeeded by: Yūko Obuchi

Member of the House of Representatives
- Incumbent
- Assumed office 19 July 1993
- Preceded by: Multi-member district
- Constituency: Tochigi 2nd (1993–1996); Tochigi 5th (1996–present)

Personal details
- Born: 7 October 1955 (age 71) Ashikaga, Tochigi, Japan
- Party: LDP (since 1994)
- Other political affiliations: JNP (1993–1994)
- Education: University of Tokyo; Harvard University
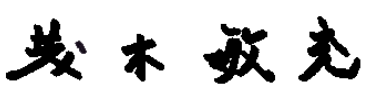
- Signature
- Website: Official website

Toshimitsu Motegi (茂木 敏充, Motegi Toshimitsu; born 7 October 1955) is a Japanese politician who is serving as Minister for Foreign Affairs and as a member of the House of Representatives. He has previously served as Minister for Foreign Affairs from 2019 to 2021, and as Minister of Economy, Trade and Industry from 2012 to 2014. He served as the Secretary-General of the Liberal Democratic Party from 2021 to 2024. He was the leader of the Heisei Kenkyūkai faction within the LDP, before its dissolution in 2024.

== Early life and education ==
A native of Ashikaga, Tochigi, Motegi was born on 7 October 1955. He graduated from the University of Tokyo in 1978 and worked for the trading company Marubeni Corporation until 1980. He received a post-graduate Master of Public Policy degree from the Harvard Kennedy School in 1983, and worked as a management consultant for McKinsey & Company from 1984 to 1992.

== Career ==
He was elected to the House of Representatives for the first time in the 1993 general election as a member of the Japan New Party, representing the Tochigi 5th district. He changed his political affiliation to the Liberal Democratic Party in 1994, when JNP was dissolved.

He was appointed Senior Vice-Minister for Foreign Affairs in October 2002 under Prime Minister Junichiro Koizumi. Koizumi then promoted him to Minister of State for Okinawa and Northern Territories Affairs, Science and Technology Policy, and Information Technology in September 2003, and on 1 August 2008, Prime Minister Yasuo Fukuda appointed him as State Minister in Charge of Financial Services and Administrative Reform.

Within the Liberal Democratic Party, Motegi is the acting chairman of the Takeshita faction, the party's third-largest with 52 members.

=== Abe government ===
Following the LDP's victory in the 2012 general election, resulting in Shinzo Abe's election as prime minister, Motegi was named Minister for Economy, Trade, and Industry.

He left the Cabinet in September 2014 to serve as Chairman of the Liberal Democratic Party Election Committee. He was appointed Chairman of the LDP Policy Council in August 2016.

Motegi was appointed Minister for Economic Revitalization and State Minister for Economic and Fiscal Policy in 2017. As minister, he was sent as a special envoy to sign the Comprehensive and Progressive Agreement for Trans-Pacific Partnership in Santiago, Chile. In August 2019, Motegi led negotiations with U.S. Trade Representative Robert Lighthizer to finalize a new trade pact between Japan and the United States. Nikkei dubbed Motegi "Japan's 'Trump whisperer'" in recognition of his role in negotiating with US President Donald Trump and his administration. Abe appointed Motegi as foreign minister in September 2019 in recognition of this success.

In 2018, Motegi was revealed to have possibly breached Japan's electoral laws. He was accused of making illegal donations of incense sticks to his constituents through his personal secretary. Opposition parties called for his resignation. He was active in gathering support for Abe's re-election as president of the Liberal Democratic Party that year.

=== Suga and Kishida governments ===
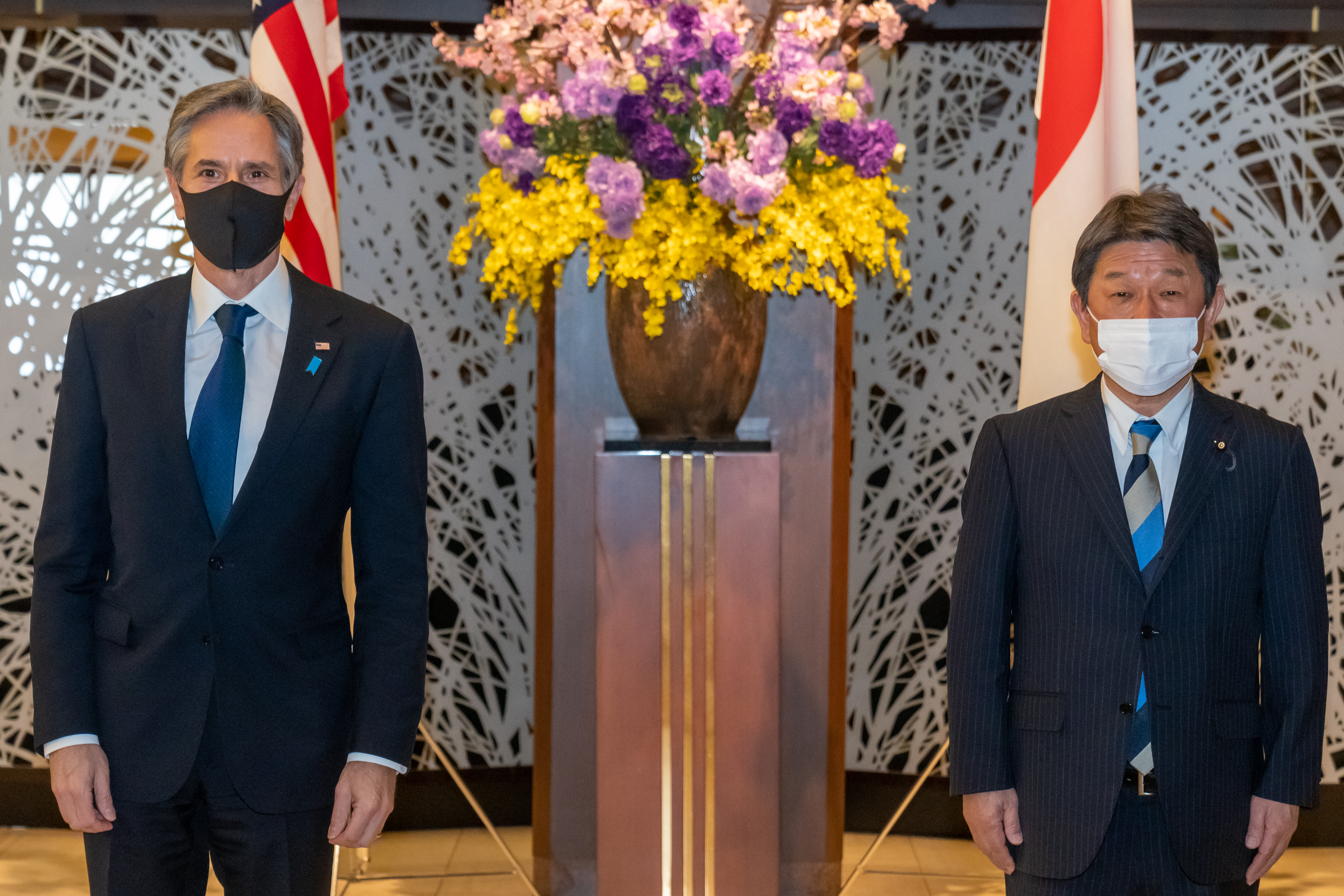
Motegi meets with U.S. Secretary of State Antony J. Blinken in Tokyo, Japan on 16 March 2021.

After Abe's resignation as prime minister, his successor Yoshihide Suga opted to retain Motegi as foreign minister after taking office in September 2020. As Suga was known to be weak in foreign affairs, this gave Motegi an opportunity to build his reputation and brand, while maintaining the foreign policy initiatives from the Abe government.

In October 2020, Motegi met with U.K. International Trade Secretary Liz Truss to sign a bilateral economic partnership agreement estimated to raise British exports to Japan by 17.2% (¥355 billion) and Japanese exports to Britain by 79.9% (¥1.775 trillion). In the trade package, British import tariffs are expected to reduce by up to 60% for Kobe beef, 31% for the Japanese chocolate snack Pocky, 22% for bluefin tuna, 13% for udon noodles, and 6% for soy sauce.

After Suga's resignation as prime minister, his successor Fumio Kishida opted to retain Motegi as foreign minister after taking office in October 2021. Nikkei noted that this sent a message of continuity in Japan's policies toward China and Taiwan.

He was appointed Secretary-General of the LDP by LDP leader Fumio Kishida after the resignation of the previous incumbent Akira Amari following the 2021 general elections. He leads one of the main factions of the LDP party and is rumored to be a potential contender to become prime minister.

The relationship between Motegi and Prime Minister Kishida has been described as extremely strained. Motegi has been described as intensely passionate in his attempt to succeed Kishida as prime minister, and Kishida has dedicated a significant amount of time to disrupting him; with factionalism now in peril due to the 2023–2024 Japanese slush fund scandal, Motegi's future within the party has been described as possibly in danger. Kishida has also allegedly been dedicating time to blocking Motegi from attempting to pursue his ambition further.

=== 2024 and 2025 LDP leadership campaigns ===
Motegi ran in the 2024 LDP Presidential election to succeed Kishida but only won 6.39% of the votes in the first round. Only a few cabinet posts were given to members of his faction, the Heisei Kenkyūkai; this was seen as punishment for Motegi backing Sanae Takaichi against Shigeru Ishiba in the second round of the LDP presidential election.

In September 2025, following Shigeru Ishiba's resignation as prime minister, Motegi became the first candidate to declare their candidacy in the 2025 LDP Presidential election. He was eliminated in the first round on 4 October.

=== Takaichi government ===
After Sanae Takaichi became prime minister, she picked Motegi to be the Minister for Foreign Affairs in her cabinet.

== Election history ==
Election	Age	District	Political party	Number of votes	election results
1993 Japanese general election	37	Tochigi 2nd district	JNP	61,865	Won
1996 Japanese general election	41	Tochigi 5th district	LDP	77,659	Won
2000 Japanese general election	44	Tochigi 5th district	LDP	108,837	Won
2003 Japanese general election	48	Tochigi 5th district	LDP	124,612	Won
2005 Japanese general election	49	Tochigi 5th district	LDP	125,773	Won
2009 Japanese general election	53	Tochigi 5th district	LDP	101,383	Won
2012 Japanese general election	57	Tochigi 5th district	LDP	101,533	Won
2014 Japanese general election	59	Tochigi 5th district	LDP	101,514	Won
2017 Japanese general election	62	Tochigi 5th district	LDP	89,403	Won
2021 Japanese general election	66	Tochigi 5th district	LDP	108,380	Won
2024 Japanese general election	69	Tochigi 5th district	LDP	99,897	Won
2026 Japanese general election	70	Tochigi 5th district	LDP	110,743	Won

Political offices
Preceded by Hiroyuki Hosoda	Minister of State for Okinawa and Northern Territories Affairs; 2003–2004	Succeeded by Yuriko Koike
Preceded by Hiroyuki Hosoda	Minister of State for Science and Technology Policy; 2003–2004	Succeeded by Yasufumi Tanahashi
Preceded by Yoshimi Watanabe	Minister of State for Financial Services; 2007–2008	Succeeded by Shōichi Nakagawa
Preceded by Yukio Edano	Minister of Economy, Trade and Industry; 2012–2014	Succeeded by Yūko Obuchi
Preceded by Nobuteru Ishihara	Minister of State for Economic and Fiscal Policy; 2017–2019	Succeeded by Yasutoshi Nishimura
Preceded by Tarō Kōno	Minister of Foreign Affairs; 2019–2021	Succeeded by Yoshimasa Hayashi
Preceded by Takeshi Iwaya	Minister of Foreign Affairs; 2025–present	Incumbent
Party political offices
Preceded by Yuriko Koike	Chief of the Public Relations Headquarters, Liberal Democratic Party; 2010–2011	Succeeded by Akira Amari
Preceded by Shigeru Ishiba	Chairman of the Policy Research Council, Liberal Democratic Party; 2011-2012	Succeeded by Akira Amari
Preceded by Takeo Kawamura	Chairman of the Election Strategy Committee, Liberal Democratic Party; 2014-2016	Succeeded by Keiji Furuya
Preceded by Tomomi Inada	Chairman of the Policy Research Council, Liberal Democratic Party; 2016-2017	Succeeded by Fumio Kishida
Preceded by Akira Amari	Secretary-General of the Liberal Democratic Party; 2021–2024	Succeeded by Hiroshi Moriyama
