= Shimotsuga District =

District in Tochigi prefecture, Japan

Coordinates: 36.359°N 139.651°E

Shimotsuga District (下都賀郡, Shimotsuga-gun) is a district located in Tochigi Prefecture, Japan.

As of 2011, the district has an estimated population of 83,304 and a density of 603 persons per km^{2}. The total area is 138.07 km^{2}.

== Towns and villages ==
- Mibu
- Nogi

== Merger ==
- On April 1, 1889, Samukawa District (寒川郡), Shimotsuke was merged into Shimotsuga District.
- On January 10, 2006, the towns of Kokubunji and Ishibashi merged with the town of Minamikawachi, from Kawachi District, to form part of the new city of Shimotsuke.
- On March 29, 2010, the towns of Fujioka, Ōhira and Tsuga merged into the city of Tochigi.
- On April 5, 2014, the town of Iwafune merged into the city of Tochigi.
