= Tochigi 2nd district =

Japan House of Representatives constituency

Tochigi 2nd District
- Parliamentary constituency for the Japanese House of Representatives
- Numbered map of Tochigi Prefecture single-member districts
- Prefecture: Tochigi
- Proportional District: Kita-Kantō
- Electorate: 262,690 (2021)

Current constituency
- Created: 1994
- Seats: One
- Party: LDP
- Representative: Kiyoshi Igarashi
- Created from: Tochigi's 1st and 2nd "medium-sized" district
- Municipalities: Kanuma, Nikkō, Sakura, Utsunomiya (Kamikawachi and Kawachi towns) and Shioya District

Tochigi 2nd district (栃木県[第]2区, Tochigi-ken-[dai-]nikku) is a single-member constituency of the House of Representatives, the lower house of the national Diet of Japan. It is located in northeastern Tochigi and consists of the cities of Kanuma, Nikkō and Sakura, part of Utsunomiya city and the two towns in Shioya District. As of 2016, 272,047 eligible voters were registered in the district.

The district is currently represented by former Governor of Tochigi Akio Fukuda. Previous representatives in the district include former Agriculture Minister Kōya Nishikawa and Justice Minister Mayumi Moriyama.

== List of representatives ==
Representative	Party	Dates	Notes
Kōya Nishikawa	LDP	1996 – 2003	
Mayumi Moriyama	LDP	2003 – 2009	
Akio Fukuda	DPJ	2009 – 2012	Won in the PR block
Kōya Nishikawa	LDP	2012 – 2014	Won in the PR block
Akio Fukuda	DPJ	2014 – 2016	
Akio Fukuda	DP	2016 – 2018	
Akio Fukuda	CDP	2018 – 2026	
Kiyoshi Igarashi	LDP	2026 -	

== Election results ==
2026
Party	Candidate	Votes	%	±%
LDP	Kiyoshi Igarashi	66,681	51.8	▲8.6
Centrist Reform	Akio Fukuda	45,129	35.1	▼21.7
Sanseitō	Kumi Fujita	16,827	13.1	
Turnout		128,637	52.94	▲3.38
LDP gain from Centrist Reform				

2024
Party	Candidate	Votes	%	±%
CDP	Akio Fukuda	68,377	56.8	▲3.4
LDP	Kiyoshi Igarashi (elected in PR block)	51,955	43.2	▼3.4
Turnout			49.56	▼4.19
CDP hold				

2021
Party	Candidate	Votes	%	±%
CDP	Akio Fukuda	73,593	53.39	▼0.02
LDP	Kiyoshi Igarashi (elected in PR block)	64,253	46.61	▲0.02
Turnout			53.75	▲0.12
CDP hold		Swing	▼0.01	

2017
Party	Candidate	Votes	%	±%
Independent	Akio Fukuda (endorsed by CDP, SDP, DP, JCP)	75,031	53.41	▲6.72
LDP	Kōya Nishikawa (endorsed by Kōmeitō)	65,445	46.59	▲0.05
Majority		16,105	8.94	
Turnout			53.63	▲2.17
Independent hold		Swing	▲3.34	

2014
Party	Candidate	Votes	%	±%
Democratic	Akio Fukuda	62,439	46.69	▲14.68
LDP	Kōya Nishikawa (elected by PR)	62,240	46.54	▲7.90
JCP	Hidemi Abe	9,054	6.77	▲3.76
Majority		199	0.15	
Turnout			51.46	▼3.40
Democratic gain from LDP		Swing	▲3.89	

2012
Party	Candidate	Votes	%	±%
LDP	Kōya Nishikawa	55,853	38.64	▲2.96
Democratic	Akio Fukuda	46,271	32.01	▼30.93
Your	Yūji Kashiwakura	38,086	26.35	N/A
JCP	Yutaka Fujii	4,348	3.01	N/A
Majority		9,582	6.63	
Turnout			54.86	
LDP gain from Democratic		Swing	▲16.45	

2009
Party	Candidate	Votes	%	±%
Democratic	Akio Fukuda	115,046	62.94	▲16.25
LDP	Kōya Nishikawa	65,222	35.68	▼17.63
Happiness Realization	Kunifumi Sakashita	2,526	1.38	N/A
Majority		49,824	27.26	
Democratic gain from LDP		Swing	▲16.94	

2005
Party	Candidate	Votes	%	±%
LDP	Mayumi Moriyama	99,115	53.31	
Democratic	Akio Fukuda	86,818	46.69	

2000
Party	Candidate	Votes	%	±%
LDP	Mayumi Moriyama	96,224	59.5	
Democratic	Mamoru Kobayashi	60,010	37.1	
JCP	Michio Fukuda	5,506	3.4	

2000
Party	Candidate	Votes	%	±%
LDP	Kōya Nishikawa	77,054	48.1	
Democratic	Mamoru Kobayashi	74,132	46.3	
JCP	Michio Fukuda	9,066	5.7	

1996
Party	Candidate	Votes	%	±%
LDP	Kōya Nishikawa	73,393	52.6	
Democratic	Mamoru Kobayashi	55,439	39.7	
JCP	Toshiharu Kobayashi	8,84	6.3	
Liberal League	Kō Takahashi	1,960	1.4	
