= Tochigi 1st district =

Japanese electoral district

Tochigi 1st District
- 栃木県第1区
- Constituency for the Japanese House of Representatives
- Prefecture: Tochigi
- Proportional District: Northern Kanto
- Electorate: 417,774 (as of September 1, 2023)

Current constituency
- Created: 1994
- Seats: One
- Party: LDP
- Representative: Hajime Funada
- Municipalities: Utsunomiya (excluding the former towns of Kamikawachi and Kawachi), Kawachi District

Tochigi 1st District (Japanese: 栃木県第1区, Hepburn: Tochigi-ken Dai-ichi ku) is a district of the Japanese House of Representatives located within Tochigi Prefecture. The district was created as part of the 1994 Japanese electoral reforms, replacing the multi-member districts with single-member districts and introducing proportional representation blocks.

== Area ==
=== Current district ===
As of 22 December 2024, The areas included in this district are as follows:

- Parts of Utsunomiya
  - Headquarters jurisdiction
  - The villages of Hiraishi, Kiyohara, Yokokawa, Mizuhono, Shiroyama, Kunimoto, Tomiya, Toyosato, Shinoi and Sugatagawa.
  - The town of Suzumenomiya
  - The neighbourhoods of Takagi and Yonan
- Kawachi District

=== Areas from 2013 to 2022 ===
From the first redistricting in 2013 until the second redistricting in 2022, the areas covered by this district were as follows:

- Parts of Utsunomiya
  - Headquarters jurisdiction
  - The villages of Hiraishi, Kiyohara, Yokokawa, Mizuhono, Shiroyama, Kunimoto, Tomiya, Toyosato, Shinoi, and Sugatagawa
  - The town of Suzumenomiya
  - The neighbourhoods of Takagi and Yonan
- Shimotsuke
- Kawachi District

=== Areas from before 2013 ===
From the founding of the district in 1994 to the first redistricting in 2013, the areas covered by this district were as follows:

- Utsunomiya
- Kawachi

== History ==
This district is an urban one centered around Tochigi's prefectural capital of Utsunomiya, formed from parts of the older multi-member 1st District following the 1994 electoral reforms. The district is known as a Conservative Kingdom, with 3 generations of the Funada family, who have always served as president of the local Sakushin Gakuin University, having been elected either in this district or in the previous larger district.

There have been only 2 times where a member of the Funada party has lost the election. The first occurred in the year 2000, when incumbent candidate Hajime Funada lost to Democratic Party newcomer Hiroko Mizushima by about 16,000 votes. Funada was able to retake the seat in 2003 and hold it again in 2005, thanks in part to the popularity of Junichiro Koizumi's government. However, in 2009 he lost again, this time to newcomer Hisashi Ishimori of the Democratic Party.

Ishimori would not be able to hold this seat in the next election however, suffering a crushing defeat to Funada after losing 90,000 votes over the previous election. Following this election, Funada has won every election and is still the incumbent.

== Elected representatives ==
Representative	Party	Years served	Notes
Hajime Funada	Ind.	1996-1997	Initially a member of the Liberal Democratic Party, he left that party to help found the New Frontier Party, following his decision to support a no-confidence motion in the LDP government. He then left the New Frontier Party in September 1996, standing in that years election as an independent. In January 1997, Funada rejoined the Liberal Democratic Party, four years after he initially left it.
Hajime Funada	LDP	1997-2000	Initially a member of the Liberal Democratic Party, he left that party to help found the New Frontier Party, following his decision to support a no-confidence motion in the LDP government. He then left the New Frontier Party in September 1996, standing in that years election as an independent. In January 1997, Funada rejoined the Liberal Democratic Party, four years after he initially left it.
Hiroko Mizushima	DPJ	2000-2003	
Hajime Funada	LDP	2003-2009	
Hisashi Ishimori	DPJ	2009-2012	
Hajime Funada	LDP	2012-	Incumbent

== Election results ==
(*) - indicates an incumbent representative of the district

(†) - indicates an incumbent of the Northern Kanto proportional district

(‡) - indicates a candidate was elected to the Northern Kanto proportional district

=== 2026 ===
2026 House of Representatives election
Party	Candidate	Votes	%	±%
LDP	Hajime Funada	85,199	40.5	▲0.58
Centrist Reform	Atsushi Koike	45,243	21.5	▼10.56
Ishin	Yuji Kashiwakura (elected in N. Kanto PR block)	41,233	19.6	▼3.58
Sanseitō	Noriaki Omori	29,337	14	
JCP	Hiroshi Aoki	6,452	3.1	▼1.74
Independent	Bunzaburo Ishikawa	2,821	1.3	
Registered electors		415,679		
Turnout		210,285	51.60	▲3.10
LDP hold				

=== 2024 ===
2024 House of Representatives election
Party	Candidate	Votes	%	±%
LDP	Hajime Funada* (Note: Funada was recommended by Komeito)	78,333	39.92	▼5.23
CDP	Itazu Yuka (Note: Yuka is a joint candidate also supported by the Tochigi branch of the Social Democratic Party)	62,914	32.06	▲2.14
Ishin	Yuji Kashiwakura	45,491	23.18	▲3.47
JCP	Hiroshi Aoki	9,490	4.84	▲0.62
Registered electors		416,436		▲18,378
Turnout			48.50	▼3.92
LDP hold				

=== 2021 ===
2021 House of Representatives election
Party	Candidate	Votes	%	±%
LDP	Hajime Funada*	102,870	46.15	▼5.28
CDP	Noriyoshi Watanabe	66,700	29.92	New
Ishin	Yuji Kashiwakura	43,935	19.71	New
JCP	Hiroshi Aoki	9,393	4.22	▼3.60
Registered electors		434,814		▲2,196
Turnout			52.42	▲2.35
LDP hold				

=== 2017 ===
2017 House of Representatives election
Party	Candidate	Votes	%	±%
LDP	Hajime Funada*	109,139	51.87	▼4.58
Kibō no Tō	Yuji Kashiwakura	51,122	24.30	New
Independent	Noriyoshi Watanabe (Note: Watanabe was recommened by the Tochigi branch of the Democratic Party of Japan)	33,681	16.01	New
JCP	Hiroshi Aoki	16,463	7.82	▼3.23
Registered electors		432,618		▲11,617
Turnout			50.07	▲1.79
LDP hold				

=== 2014 ===
2014 House of Representatives election
Party	Candidate	Votes	%	±%
LDP	Hajime Funada*	110,030	56.45	▲9.82
Democratic	Yuji Kashiwakura^{†} (Note: Kashiwakura ran for Tochigi's 2nd district in the 2012 Japanese general election. Even though he lost the district, he gained enough votes to be elected to the North Kanto proportional block)	63,332	32.49	▲6.34
JCP	Setsuko Nomura	21,543	11.05	▲6.47
Registered electors		421,001		▲3,091
Turnout			48.28	▼4.75
LDP hold				

=== 2012 ===
2012 House of Representatives election
Party	Candidate	Votes	%	±%
LDP	Hajime Funada	100,133	46.63	▲5.33
Democratic	Hisashi Ishimori* (Note: Ishimori was recommended by the People's New Party)	56,143	26.15	▼27.84
Your	Daiju Araki (Note: Araki was recommended by the Japan Restoration Party)	50,771	23.64	New
JCP	Akio Tabe	7,687	3.58	▲0.29
Registered electors		417,910		▲4,348
Turnout			53.03	▼13.43
LDP gain from Democratic				

=== 2009 ===
2009 House of Representatives election
Party	Candidate	Votes	%	±%
Democratic	Hisashi Ishimori	145,702	53.99	▲13.45
LDP	Hajime Funada*	111,455	41.30	▼14.13
JCP	Kazunori Koike	8,883	3.29	▼0.71
Happiness Realization	Hiroyuki Kawachi	3,386	1.42	New
Registered electors		413,562		▲10,290
Turnout			66.46	▲1.88
Democratic gain from LDP				

=== 2005 ===
2005 House of Representatives election
Party	Candidate	Votes	%	±%
LDP	Hajime Funada*	141,868	55.43	▲2.36
Democratic	Hiroko Mizushima^{†}	103,757	40.54	▼3.42
JCP	Setsuko Nomura	10,301	4.03	▲1.06
Registered electors		403,272		▲6,376
Turnout			64.58	▲4.85
LDP hold				

=== 2003 ===
2003 House of Representatives election
Party	Candidate	Votes	%	±%
LDP	Hajime Funada*	123,297	53.07	▲12.33
Democratic	Hiroko Mizushima^{‡}	102,127	43.96	▼4.01
JCP	Akio Tabe	6,904	2.97	▼1.68
Registered electors		396,896		▲10,911
Turnout			59.73	▲0.03
LDP gain from Democratic				

=== 2000 ===
2000 House of Representatives election
Party	Candidate	Votes	%	±%
Democratic	Hiroko Mizushima	107,634	47.97	New
LDP	Hajime Funada*	91,411	40.74	New
Social Democratic	Ryuji Yagi	10,584	4.72	New
JCP	Setsuko Nomura	10,422	4.65	▼1.39
Liberal League	Hirotsugu Nishi	4,319	1.92	▼0.24
Registered electors		385,985		▲15,429
Turnout			59.70	▼5.68
Democratic gain from LDP				

=== 1996 ===
1996 House of Representatives election
Party	Candidate	Votes	%
Independent	Hajime Funada	127,503	63.36
Democratic	Susumu Yanase (Note: Yanase was previously a representative of the multi-member Tochigi 1st District before the 1994 Japanese electoral reform replaced the district with the current single-member district)	57,420	28.44
JCP	Tomoji Taki	12,154	6.04
Liberal League	Hiroshi Nishi	4,345	2.16
Registered electors		370,556	
Turnout			65.38
Independent win (new seat)			
