= Kaminokawa =

Kaminokawa 上三川町
- Town
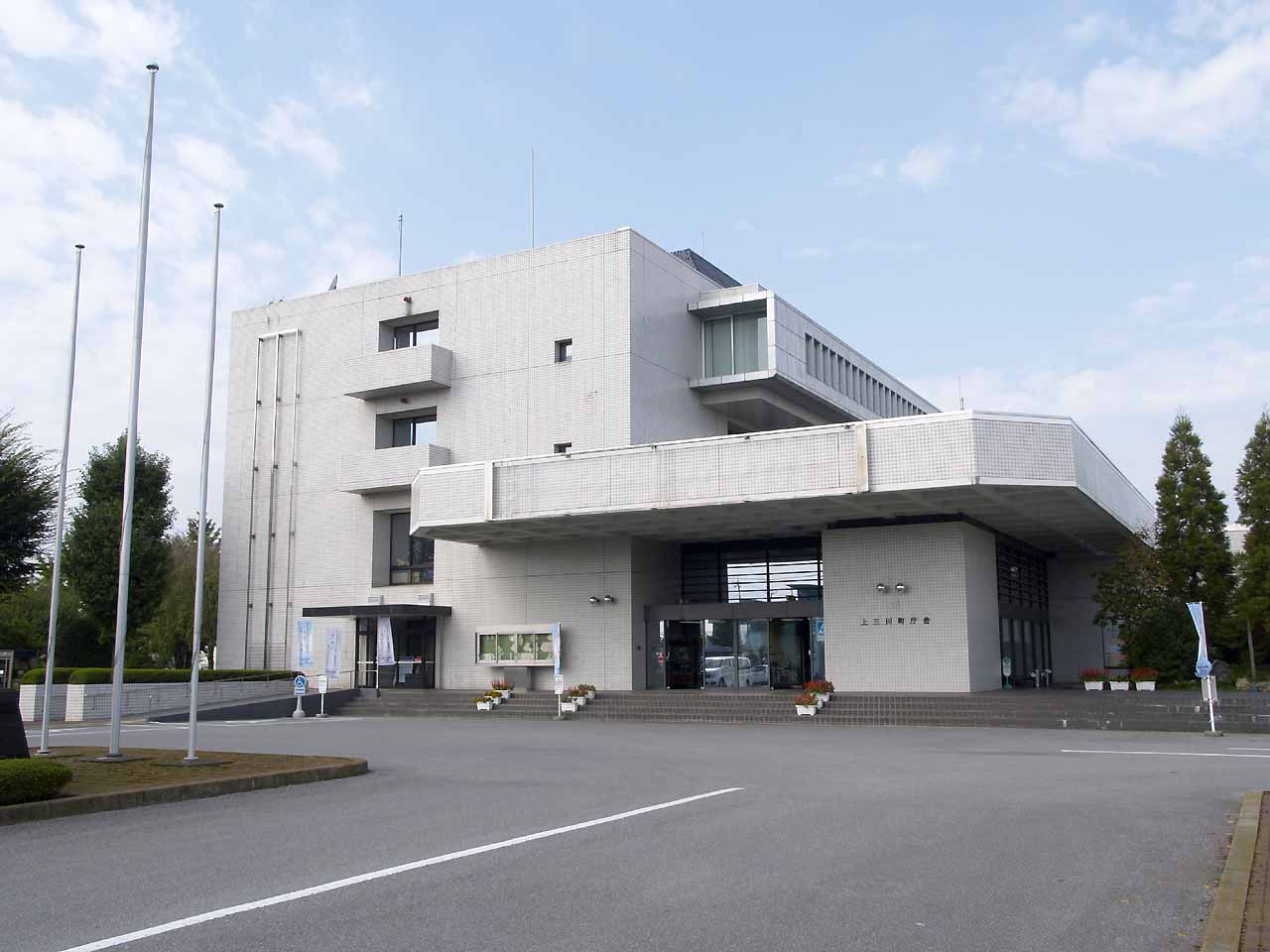
- Kaminokawa Town Office

- Flag Seal

- Location of Kaminokawa in Tochigi Prefecture

- Coordinates: 36°26′21.5″N 139°54′35.5″E
- Country: Japan
- Region: Kantō
- Prefecture: Tochigi
- District: Kawachi

Area
  - Total: 54.39 km^{2} (21.00 sq mi)

Population (August 2020)
  - Total: 31,243
  - Density: 574.4/km^{2} (1,488/sq mi)
- Time zone: UTC+9 (Japan Standard Time)
- Tree: Ginkgo biloba
- Flower: Calabash
- Bird: Egret
- Phone number: 0285-56-9111
- Address: Shirasagi 1-1, Kaminokawa-machi, Kawachi-gun, Tochigi-ken 329-0696
- Website: Official website

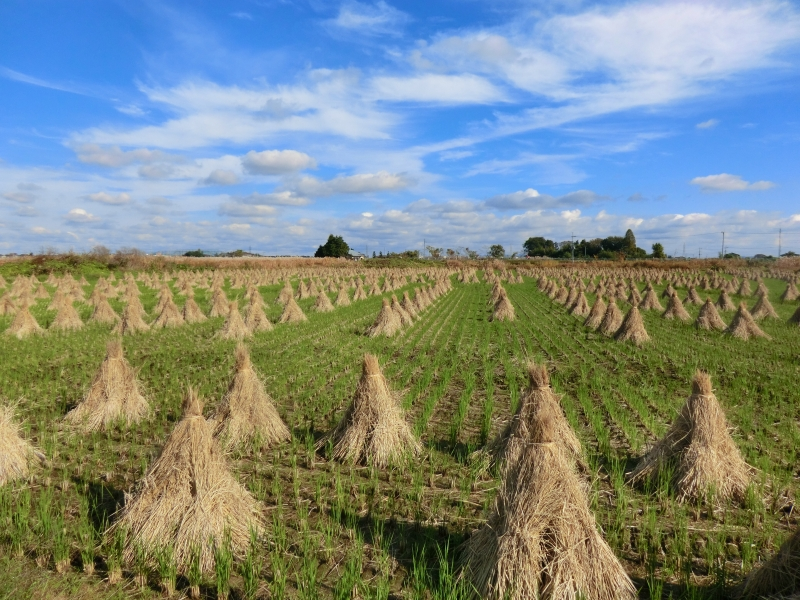
Harvested rice fields in Kaminokawa

Kaminokawa (上三川町, Kaminokawa-machi) is a town located in Tochigi Prefecture, Japan. As of 1 August 2020, the town had an estimated population of 31,243 in 12,061 households, and a population density of 570 persons per km^{2}. The total area of the town is 54.39 square kilometres (21.00 sq mi).

== Geography ==
Kaminokawa is located in the southeastern Tochigi Prefecture, approximately 90 kilometers north of Tokyo metropolis. The town area consists of flat areas and rivers, with no mountains and is a northern extension of the Kanto plain. The town is bordered by the prefectural capital of Utsunomiya to the north. The Kinugawa River flows through the town.

== Surrounding municipalities ==
Tochigi Prefecture

- Mooka
- Shimotsuke
- Utsunomiya

== Climate ==
Kaminokawa has a humid subtropical climate (Köppen Cfa) characterized by warm summers and cold winters with heavy snowfall. The average annual temperature in Kaminokawa is 13.8 °C. The average annual rainfall is 1378 mm with September as the wettest month. The temperatures are highest on average in August, at around 26.1 °C, and lowest in January, at around 2.4 °C.

== Demographics ==
Per Japanese census data, the population of Kaminokawa has recently plateaued after a long period of growth.

Historical population
Year	Pop.	±%
1920	13,961	—
1930	15,037	+7.7%
1940	15,881	+5.6%
1950	19,824	+24.8%
1960	17,766	−10.4%
1970	18,003	+1.3%
1980	24,597	+36.6%
1990	27,300	+11.0%
2000	29,421	+7.8%
2010	31,617	+7.5%
2020	30,806	−2.6%

== History ==
The villages of Kaminokawa, Hongo and Tako were created within Haga District on April 1, 1889, with the creation of the modern municipalities system. On December 26, 1891, Tako Village was renamed Meiji Village. Kaminokawa was elevated to town status on July 1, 1893. On April 29, 1955, Kaminokawa annexed Meiji and Hongo.

== Government ==
Kaminokawa has a mayor-council form of government with a directly elected mayor and a unicameral town council of 14 members. Kaminokawa, together with the city of Utsunomiya collectively contributes 13 members to the Tochigi Prefectural Assembly. In terms of national politics, the town is part of Tochigi 1st district of the lower house of the Diet of Japan.

== Economy ==
The Nissan Tochigi plant is located within Kaminokawa and is a major local employer.

== Education ==
Kaminokawa has seven public primary schools and three public middle schools operated by the town government. The town has one public high school operated by the Tochigi Prefectural Board of Education.

== Transportation ==
=== Railway ===
Kaminokawa does not have any passenger train services.

=== Highway ===
- Tōhoku Expressway – Utsunomiya-Kaminokawa IC
- National Route 4
- National Route 352
