= Tomikazu Fukuda =

Japanese politician

- 福田 富一
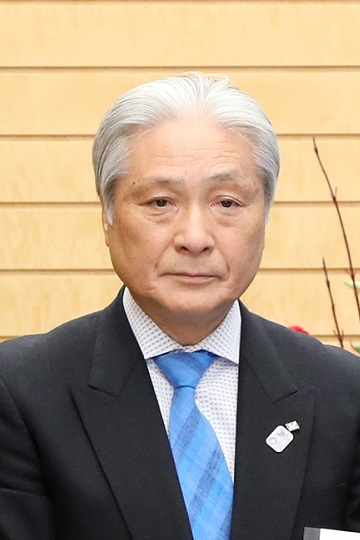
- Fukuda in 2019

Governor of Tochigi Prefecture
- Incumbent
- Assumed office 9 December 2004
- Monarchs: Akihito; Naruhito
- Preceded by: Akio Fukuda

Mayor of Utsunomiya
- In office 30 April 1999 – 15 October 2004
- Preceded by: Michiyasu Masuyama
- Succeeded by: Eiichi Sato

Member of the Tochigi Prefectural Assembly
- In office 1991–1999
- Constituency: Utsunomiya City

Member of the Utsunomiya City Council
- In office 1983–1990

Personal details
- Born: 21 May 1953 (age 73) Imaichi, Tochigi, Japan
- Party: Independent
- Education: Nihon University

Tomikazu Fukuda (福田 富一, Fukuda Tomikazu; born 21 May 1953) is a Japanese politician who serves as governor of Tochigi Prefecture since 2004.

== Early life ==
Fukuda is a native of Imaichi, Tochigi. He graduated of Nihon University.

== Political career ==
Fukuda served in the city assembly of Utsunomiya, Tochigi from 1983 and then in the Tochigi Prefectural Assembly from 1991.

He also served as mayor of Utsunomiya for two terms from 1999 until his election as governor in 2004. He was reelected on 16 November 2008, in a two-person election, and in every election since.

His is currently serving his sixth term, which expires on 8 December 2028.
