= Koya Nishikawa =

Japanese politician

- 西川 公也
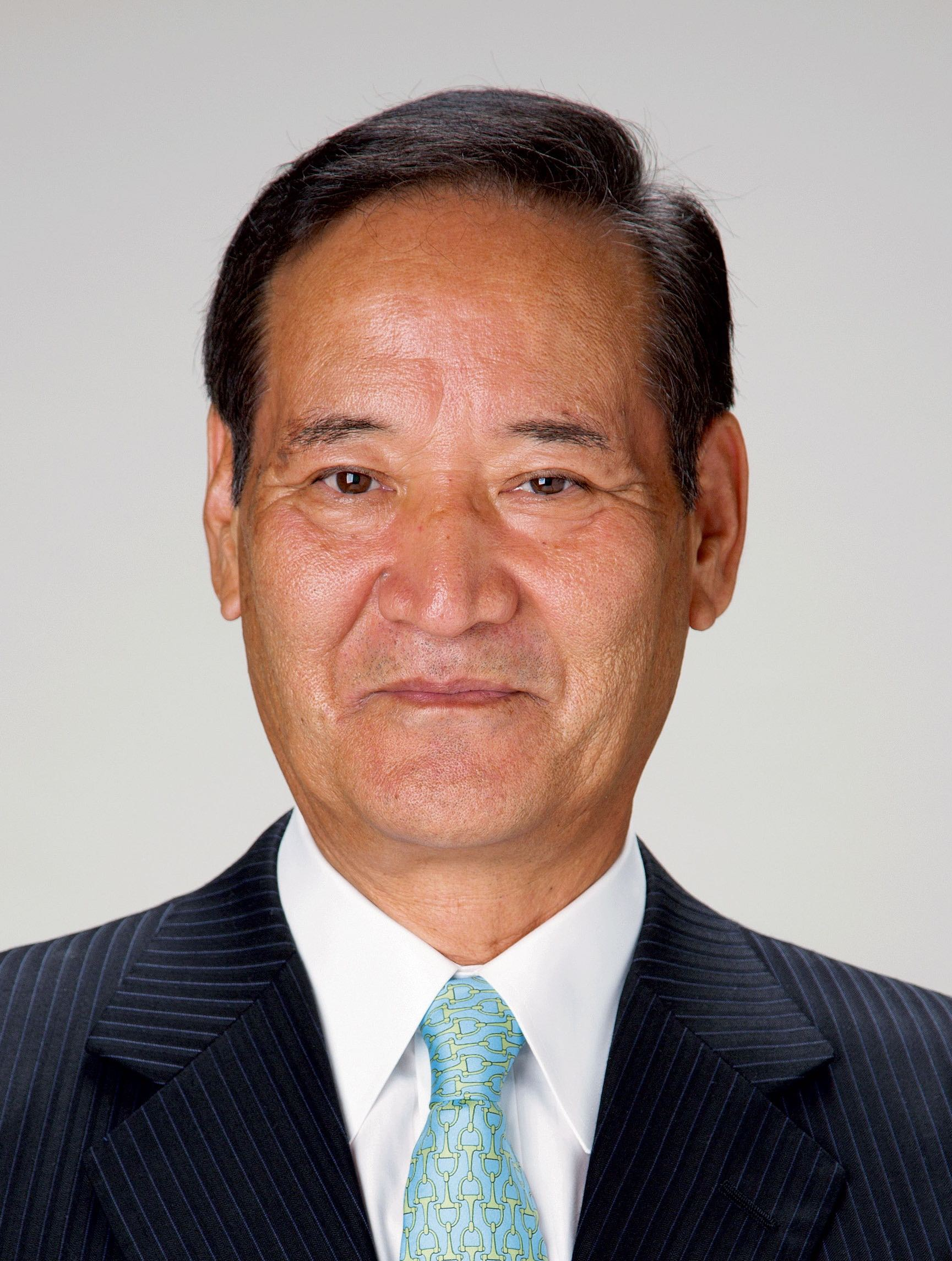
- Official portrait, 2014

Minister of Agriculture, Forestry and Fisheries
- In office 3 September 2014 – 23 February 2015
- Prime Minister: Shinzo Abe
- Preceded by: Yoshimasa Hayashi
- Succeeded by: Yoshimasa Hayashi

Member of the House of Representatives; from Northern Kanto
- In office 19 December 2012 – 28 September 2017
- Preceded by: Akio Fukuda
- Succeeded by: Multi-member district
- Constituency: Tochigi 2nd (2012–2014); PR block (2014–2017)
- In office 21 October 1996 – 21 July 2009
- Preceded by: Constituency established
- Succeeded by: Multi-member district
- Constituency: Tochigi 2nd (1996–2003); PR block (2003–2009)

Speaker of the Tochigi Prefectural Assembly
- In office March 1993 – March 1994

Member of the Tochigi Prefectural Assembly
- In office 30 April 1991 – October 1996
- Constituency: Shioya District
- In office 30 April 1979 – 30 June 1989
- Constituency: Shioya District

Personal details
- Born: 26 December 1942 (age 83) Ujiie, Tochigi, Japan
- Party: Liberal Democratic
- Education: Tokyo University of Agriculture and Technology

Koya Nishikawa (西川 公也, Nishikawa Kōya; born 26 December 1942) is a Japanese politician of the Liberal Democratic Party, a member of House of Representatives in the Diet (national legislature). A native of Shioya District, Tochigi he attended Tokyo University of Agriculture and Technology as both undergraduate and graduate students. After college, he worked at the government Tochigi Prefecture from 1967 to 1978. He was elected to the assembly of Tochigi Prefecture for the first time in 1979 and then to the Diet for the first time in 1996.

On 9 December 2020, he resigned as the special adviser to the Cabinet after being involved in a bribery scandal corresponding to a boating trip hosted by a former head of a major egg farm, who was involved in a separate bribery case.

Political offices
Preceded by Yoshimasa Hayashi	Minister of Agriculture, Forestry and Fisheries; September 2014 – February 2015	Succeeded by Yoshimasa Hayashi
