= Utsunomiya Domain =

Feudal domain under Japan's Edo period

Utsunomiya Domain 宇都宮藩
- under Tokugawa shogunate Japan
- 1601–1871
- Capital: Utsunomiya Castle
  - Type: Daimyō
- Historical era: Edo period
  - Established: 1601
  - Disestablished: 1871
- Today part of: part of Tochigi Prefecture

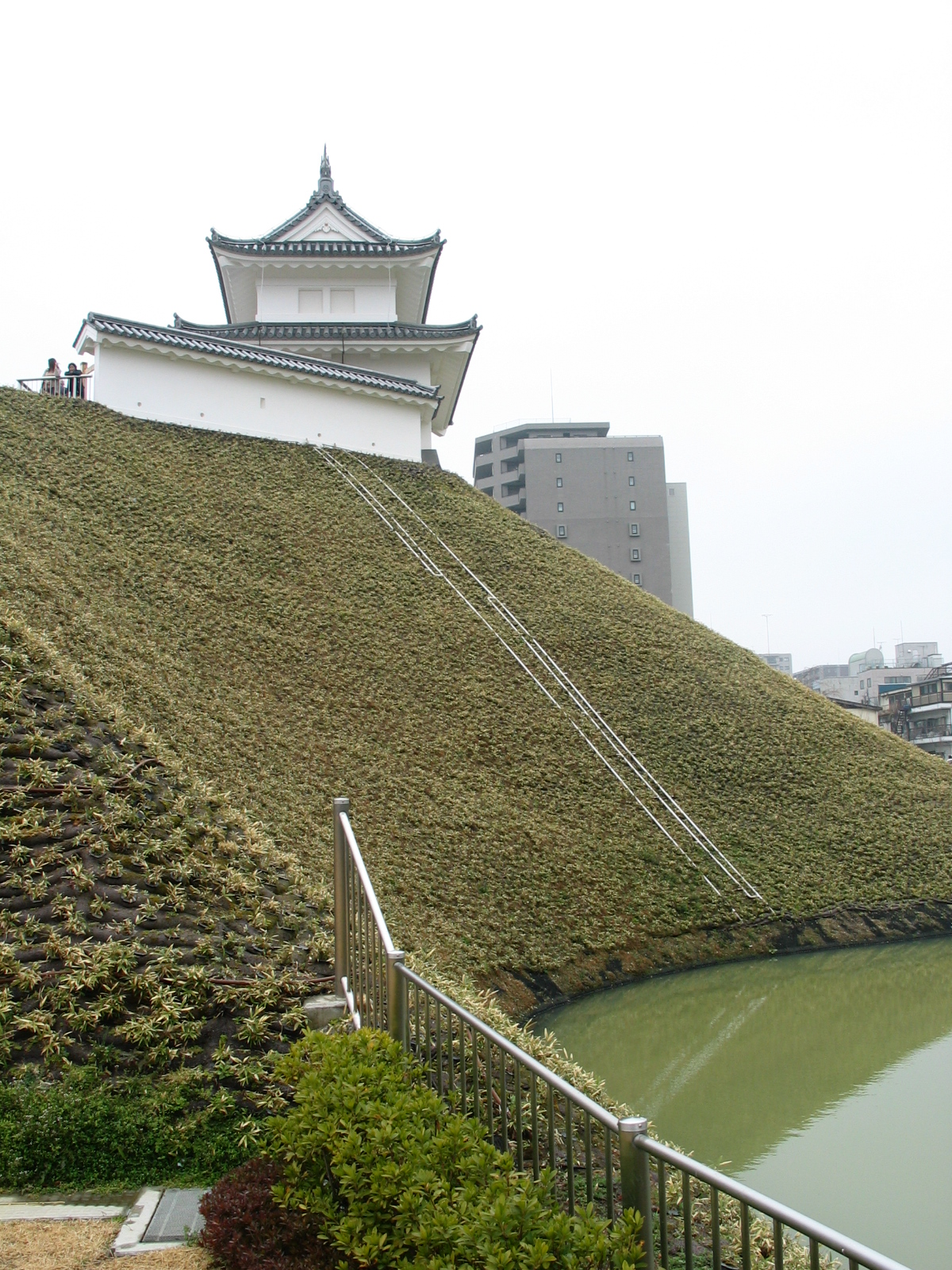
Reconstructed yagura of Utsunomiya Castle, administrative center of Utsunomiya Domain

Utsunomiya Domain (宇都宮藩, Utsunomiya-han) was a feudal domain under the Tokugawa shogunate of Edo period Japan, located in Shimotsuke Province (modern-day Tochigi Prefecture), Japan. It was centered on Utsunomiya Castle in what is now part of the city of Utsunomiya. Utsunomiya was ruled by numerous daimyō clans during its history.

== History ==
Utsunomiya has been ruled by the Utsunomiya clan, one of the eight major samurai bands of the northern Kantō region and a cadet branch of the Fujiwara clan since the Kamakura period. For assisting Toyotomi Hideyoshi in the 1590 Battle of Odawara, Utsunomiya Kunitsuna had been confirmed as a 187,613 koku daimyō. However, in 1597 the Utsunomiya were stripped of their holdings when Hideyoshi's spies revealed that their actual income was more than double what he had authorized. The area then briefly came under the Gamō clan of Aizu, but after the Battle of Sekigahara and the creation of the Tokugawa shogunate, Tokugawa Ieyasu regarded the location as strategically important due to its position at the junction of the Ōshū Kaidō and the Nikkō Kaidō.

The 100,000 koku Utsunomiya Domain was created for Okudaira Iemasa, the grandson of Tokugawa Ieyasu via his eldest daughter Kame-hime. His creation came as somewhat of a surprise, as he had until this point been largely ignored by Ieyasu and had no domain or even a base of retainers to assist him. However, at the time of the Osaka Campaign Iemasa fell ill, and was ordered to remain behind at Edo Castle, where he died a few days later. His son, Okudaira Tadamasa was confirmed as daimyō, but was only seven years old, and it was decided that Utsunomiya was too important to be left in his hands. He was given an increase to 110,000 koku and transferred to Koga Domain in Shimōsa.

To replace the Okudaira, the Shogunate turned to the trusted Honda clan, moving Honda Masazumi from Oyama Domain in 1617 and increasing the holdings of Utsunomiya to 155,000 koku. He largely rebuilt the Utsunomiya Castle and the surrounding castle town, and successfully hosted shōgun Tokugawa Hidetada on his way to worship at the Nikkō Tōshō-gū in 1622. However, Hidetada bypassed Utsunomiya on his way back to Edo, and Masazumi was soon relieved of office and exiled to Kubota Domain under house arrest. The reason given was that the Shogun’s investigators had uncovered a plot to assassinate Hidetada using a trap room with a falling ceiling (i.e. The “Utsunomiya Castle Hanging Ceiling Incident”).

The domain was then returned to Okudaira Tadamasa and reduced back to 110,000 koku. Tadamasa ruled Utsunomiya for the next 46 years until his death in 1668, hosting the shogunal entourage on several occasions. However, on his death, one of his senior retainers, Sugiura Ezaemon, committed junshi, which had been outlawed by the shogunate five years previously. Also, a few days after this, a retainer of the domain was involved in the “Utsunomiya Kozen-ji Duel”, whereas dueling was also prohibited. Oukdaira Tadamasa’s son Masayoshi was reduced by 20,000 koku and transferred to Yamagata Domain.

Utsunomiya was then given to Matsudaira Tadahiro, and the domain increased to 150,000 koku. Tadahiro’s father was Okudaira Tadamasa’s brother by the same mother. He was transferred to Shirakawa Domain in Mutsu 13 years later in 1681.

The domain then returned to the Honda clan in the form of Honda Tadahira, who had traded places from Shirakawa with Matsudaira Tadahiro. However, his rule proved very unpopular and he had difficulty in securing the cooperation of his subjects in taxes. He was transferred to Yamato-Koriyama in 1685.

The domain was reduced further to 90,000 koku, and Okudaira Masayoshi’s son, Okudaira Masaakira was permitted to return from Yamagata to Utsunomiya. He is noted for establishing a medical system with 20 doctors in Utsunomiya to treat travelers. He died in 1695 at the age of 28, and as his son Masashige was only two years old, he was transferred to Fukuyama Domain in Bungo.

The domain as then given to Abe Masakuni, formerly of Miyazu Domain in Tango, who ruled for 13 years until his transfer to Fukuyama Domain as well.

The domain was reduced further to 70,000 koku and was then given to Toda Tadazane, formerly of Takada Domain in Echigo. He served as rōjū to Tokugawa Ietsugu and Tokugawa Yoshimune. His son and grandson ruled, until the clan traded places with Matsudaira Tadamasa of Shimabara Domain in Hizen in 1738. Under the Matsudaira, Utsunomiya suffered from repeated floods and crop failure. The expenses involved in the change of domains from distant Shimabara meant that the Matsudaira had to press for increased taxes, which led to several peasant revolts, which had to be suppressed by military force. To add to their woes, Utsunomiya town also suffered from repeated fires, which caused yet more damage and economic issues. Matsudaira Tadahiro was transferred back to Shimabara in 1774, trading places again with the Toda clan.

Toda Tadato was the fourth son of Toda Tadami, and as with the Matsudaira, the move back-and-forth from distant Shimabara all but bankrupted the clan, and the pilgrimage of Shogun Tokugawa Ieharu to the Nikkō Tōshō-gū in 1776 further complicated matters. Nevertheless, the clan struggled on to the Bakumatsu period over seven generations.

During the Boshin War of the Meiji Restoration, the Battle of Utsunomiya Castle occurred in 1868. Former Tokugawa retainers under Ōtori Keisuke and Hijikata Toshizō led forces which captured Utsunomiya Castle while the final daimyō of Utsunomiya, Toda Tadatomo, was absent, as he had been charged by Tokugawa Yoshinobu with traveling to Kyoto and submitting a letter of apology and submission. However, pro-Imperial forces recaptured the castle a week later.

After the abolition of the han system in July 1871, Utsunomiya Domain became part of Tochigi Prefecture. The domain had a population of 59,908 people in 15,557 households, per a census in 1870.

== Holdings at the end of the Edo period ==
As with most domains in the han system, Utsunomiya Domain consisted of several discontinuous territories calculated to provide the assigned kokudaka, based on periodic cadastral surveys and projected agricultural yields.

- Shimotsuke Province
  - 8 villages in Tsuga District
  - 114 villages in Kawachi District
  - 3 villages in Haga District
  - 43 villages in Shioya District

== List of daimyōs ==
#	Name	Tenure	Courtesy title	Court Rank	kokudaka
Okudaira clan (fudai) 1601–1619
1	Okudaira Iemasa (奥平家昌)	1601–1614	Daizen-no-daifu (大膳大夫); Jijū (侍従)	Lower 4th (従四位下)	100,000 koku
2	Okudaira Tadamasa (奥平忠昌)	1614–1619	Mimasaka-no-kami (美作守)	Lower 4th (従四位下)	100,000 koku
Honda clan (fudai) 1619–1622
1	Honda Masazumi (本多正純)	1619–1622	Kozuke-no-suke (上野介)	Lower 5th (従五位下)	155,000 koku
Okudaira clan (fudai) 1622–1668
1	Okudaira Tadamasa (奥平忠昌)	1622–1668	Mimasaka-no-kami (美作守)	Lower 4th (従四位下)	110,000 koku
2	Okudaira Masayoshi (奥平昌能)	1668–1668	Daizen-no-suke (大膳亮)	Lower 5th (従五位下)	110,000 koku
Okudaira-Matsudaira clan (shinpan) 1668–1681
1	Matsudaira Tadahiro (松平忠弘)	1668–1681	Shimosa-no-kami (下総守)	Lower 4th (従四位下); Jijū(侍従)	150,000 koku
Honda clan (fudai) 1681–1685
1	Honda Tadahira (本多忠平)	1681–1685	Noto-no-kami (能登守)	Lower 4th (従四位下)	110,000 koku
Okudaira clan (fudai) 1685–1697
1	Okudaira Masaakira (奥平昌章)	1685–1695	Mimasaka-no-kami (美作守)	Lower 5th (従五位下)	90,000 koku
2	Okudaira Masashige (奥平昌成)	1695–1697	Daizen-no-daifu (大膳大夫)	Lower 4th (従四位下)	110,000 koku
Abe clan (fudai) 1697–1710
1	Abe Masakuni (阿部正邦)	1697–1710	Tsushima-no-kami (対馬守)	Lower 5th (従五位下)	100,000 koku
Toda clan (fudai) 1710–1749
1	Toda Tadazane (戸田忠真)	1710–1729	Yasashiro-no-kami (山城守); Jijū （侍従）	Lower 4th (従四位下)	67,000 → 77,000 koku
2	Toda Tadami (戸田忠余)	1729–1746	Hyuga-no-kami (日向守)	Lower 5th (従五位下)	77,000 koku
3	Toda Tadamitsu (戸田忠盈)	1746–1749	Hyuga-no-kami (日向守)	Lower 5th (従五位下)	77,000 koku
Fukozu-Matsudaira clan (fudai) 1749–1774
1	Matsudaira Tadamasa (松平忠祇)	1749–1762	Tonomo-no-kami (主殿頭)	Lower 5th (従五位下)	66,000 koku
2	Matsudaira Tadahiro (松平忠恕)	1762–1774	Tonomo-no-kami (主殿頭)	Lower 5th (従五位下)	66,000 koku
Toda clan (fudai) 1774–1871
1	Toda Tadato (戸田忠寛)	1774–1798	Inaba-no-kami (因幡守); Jijū （侍従）	Lower 4th (従四位下)	77,000 koku
2	Toda Tadanaka (戸田忠翰)	1798–1811	Noto-no-kami (能登守)	Lower 5th (従五位下)	77,000 koku
3	Toda Tadanobu (戸田忠延)	1811–1823	Hyuga-no-kami (日向守)	Lower 5th (従五位下)	77,000 koku
4	Toda Tadaharu (戸田忠温)	1823–1851	Yamashiro-no-kami (日向守); Jijū (侍従)	Lower 4th (従四位下)	77,000 koku
5	Toda Tadaaki (戸田忠明)	1851–1856	Inaba-no-kami (因幡守)	Lower 5th (従五位下)	77,000 koku
6	Toda Tadayuki (戸田忠恕)	1856–1865	Uchizen-no-kami (越前守)	Lower 5th (従五位下)	77,000 koku
7	Toda Tadatomo (戸田忠友)	1865–1871	Tosa-no-kami (土佐守)	Lower 5th (従五位下)	77,000 koku
