= Hajime Funada =

Japanese politician (born 1953)

- 船田 元
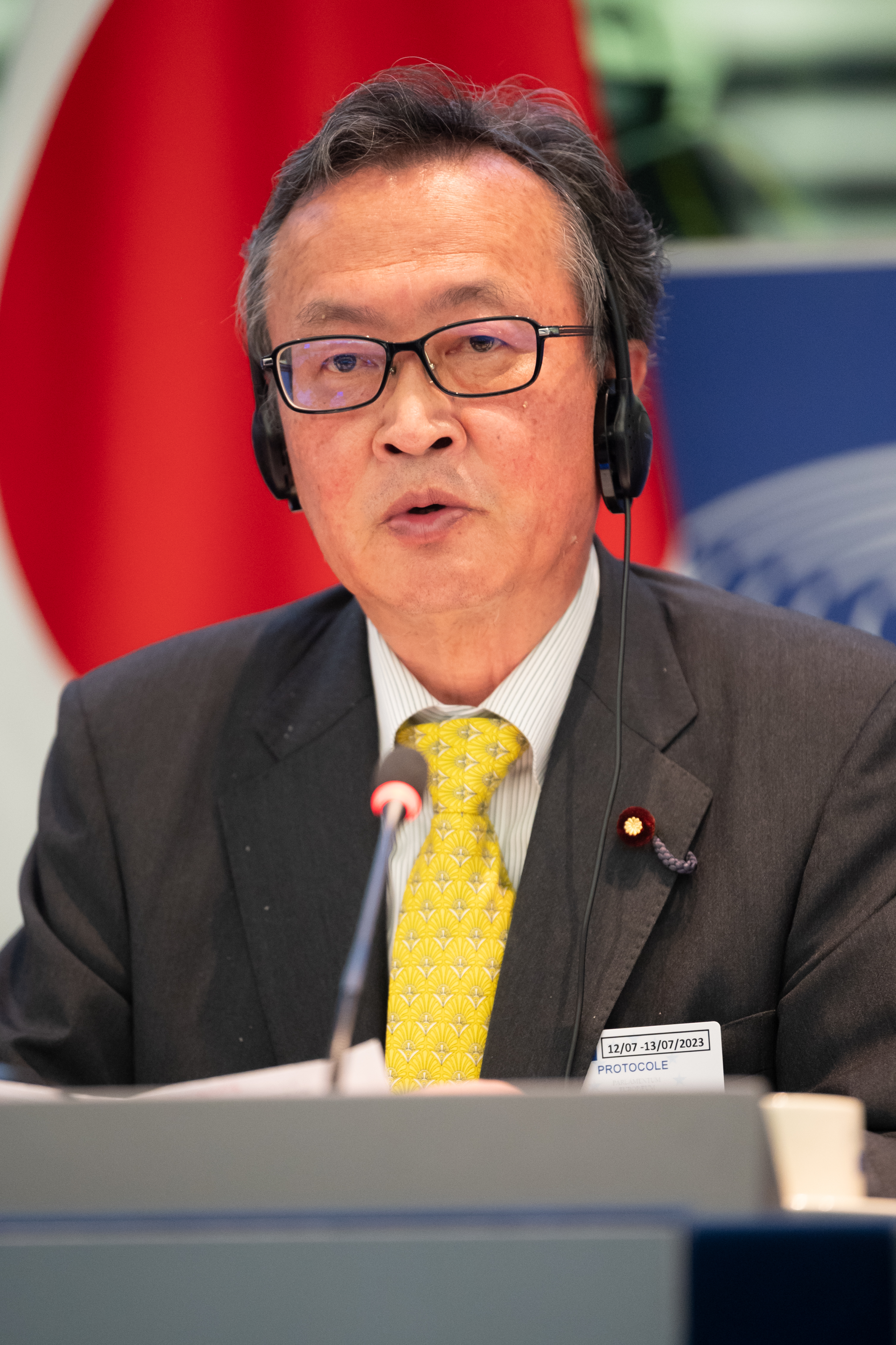
- Funada in 2023

Director-General of the Economic Planning Agency
- In office 12 December 1992 – 18 June 1993
- Prime Minister: Kiichi Miyazawa
- Preceded by: Takeshi Noda
- Succeeded by: Osamu Takatori

Member of the House of Representatives
- Incumbent
- Assumed office 19 December 2012
- Preceded by: Hisatsugu Ishimori
- Constituency: Tochigi 1st
- In office 11 November 2003 – 21 July 2009
- Preceded by: Hiroko Mizushima
- Succeeded by: Hisatsugu Ishimori
- Constituency: Tochigi 1st
- In office 8 October 1979 – 2 June 2000
- Preceded by: Funada Naka
- Succeeded by: Hiroko Mizushima
- Constituency: Former Tochigi 1st (1979–1996); Tochigi 1st (1996–2000)

Personal details
- Born: 22 November 1953 (age 72) Utsunomiya, Tochigi, Japan
- Party: Liberal Democratic
- Other political affiliations: JRP (1993–1994); NFP (1994–1998)
- Education: Keio University

Hajime Funada (船田 元, Funada Hajime; born 22 November 1953) is a Japanese politician of the Liberal Democratic Party, who serve as a member of the House of Representatives in the Diet (national legislature) and a former Minister of Economic Planning. A native of Utsunomiya, Tochigi he attended Keio University both as undergraduate and graduate. He was elected to the House of Representatives for the first time in 1979.

== Family ==
- Motoda Hajime (his great-grandfather)
- Naka Funada (his grandfather)
- Kyoji Funada (his great-uncle)
- Sensuke Fujieda (his great-uncle)
- Yuzuru Funada (his father)
- Kei Funada (his wife)

== Political positions ==
- parliamentary vice-minister of education
- parliamentary vice-minister of Public Management, Home Affairs, Posts and Telecommunications
- Director General of the Economic Planning Agency
- Acting Chairman, Headquarters for the Promotion of Revision to the Constitution

== Political affiliations ==
Funada is affiliated to the following right wing groups in the Diet:

- Diet Member Alliance for Enacting a New Constitution (新憲法制定議員同盟 – Shinkenpou seitei giin doumei)
- Conference of parliamentarians on the Shinto Association of Spiritual Leadership (神道政治連盟国会議員懇談会 - Shinto Seiji Renmei Kokkai Giin Kondankai) - NB: SAS a.k.a. Sinseiren, Shinto Political League
