= Battle of Utsunomiya Castle =

1868 battle of the Boshin War in Japan

- Part of Boshin War
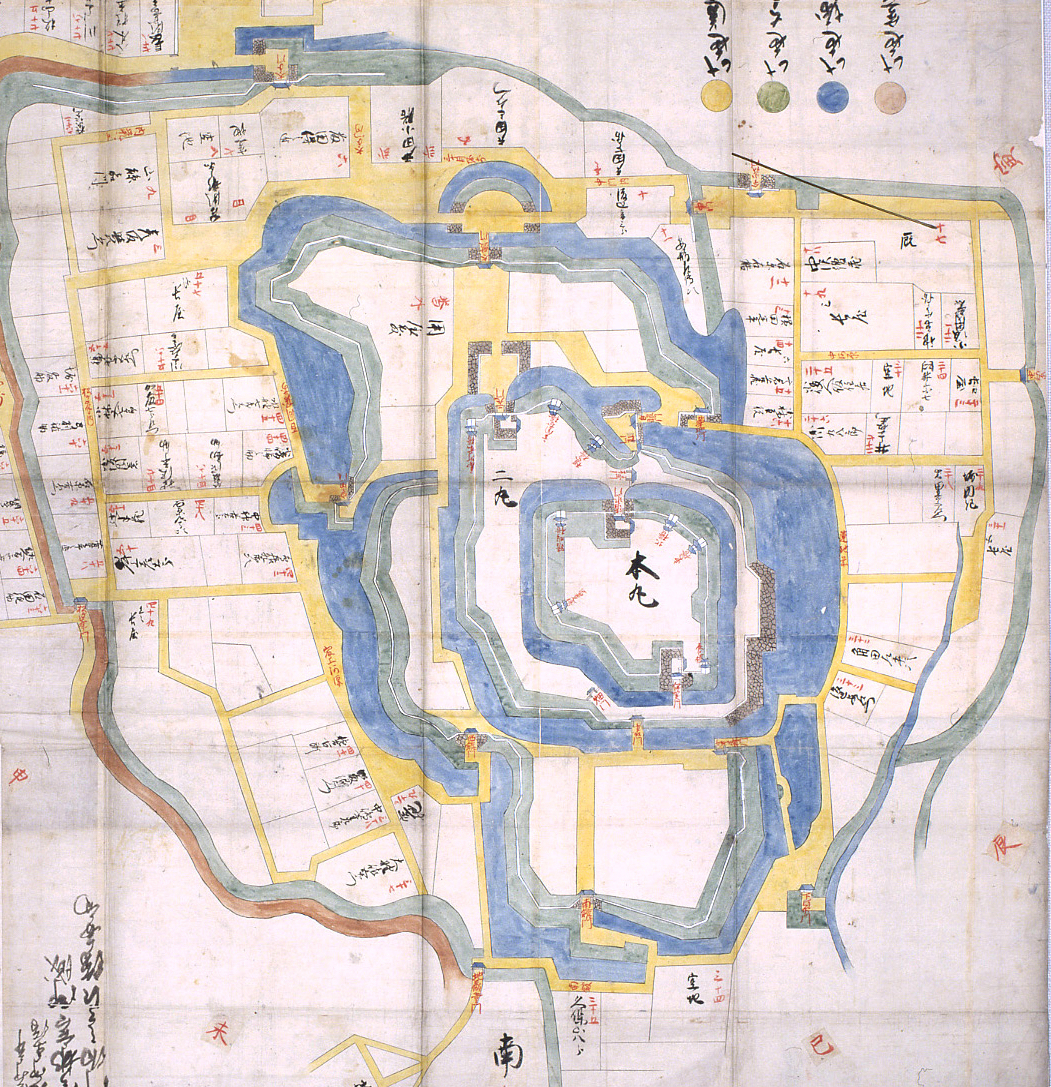
- Utsunomiya castle during the Edo period
Date	10–14 May 1868
Location	Utsunomiya Castle 36.5547°N 139.8851°E
Result	Imperial victory

Belligerents
Imperial Court	Tokugawa shogunate

Commanders and leaders
Ruler: Meiji Emperor; Army: Kagawa Keizo, Ijichi Masaharu, Toda Tadayuki, Arima Tōta, Ōyama Iwao, Nozu Michitsura, Kagetomo Kawata	Shogun: Tokugawa Yoshinobu; Army: Takenaka Shigekata, Ōtori Keisuke, Hijikata Toshizō, Taro Egami, Tatsumi Naofumi

Strength
700; 20,000 reinforcements	2,000 (1,000 during the first attack)

Casualties and losses
Unknown	Destroyed: Utsunomiya Castle, Futarasan Shrine Castle, 48 temples

The Battle of Utsunomiya Castle (宇都宮城の戦い, Utsunomiyajō no tatakai) took place between pro-imperial and Tokugawa shogunate forces during the Boshin War in Japan in May 1868 at Utsunomiya Castle. It occurred as the troops of the Tokugawa shogunate were retreating north towards Nikkō and Aizu.

== Background ==
In early spring 1868, former Tokugawa retainers under Ōtori Keisuke and Hijikata Toshizō left the shōgun's capital of Edo en masse and gathered at Kōnodai. There were small numbers of men of Aizu under Akizuki Noborinosuke and Kuwana troops under Tatsumi Naofumi also present, as well as a handful of surviving shinsengumi, such as Shimada Kai. While many of their numbers were samurai, there were also many members of other social classes present, particularly under Ōtori's direct command. Their objective was Utsunomiya, a castle town on the road northward to Nikkō and Aizu, which was a position of vital strategic importance. The daimyō of Utsunomiya, Toda Tadatomo, was absent, as he had been charged by Tokugawa Yoshinobu with traveling to Kyoto and submitting a letter of apology and submission. Upon his arrival in Ōtsu, Toda was met by Satsuma–Chōshū forces and placed under confinement, as such a message reaching the ears of Emperor Meiji might have resulted in a premature pardon that would have complicated the alliance's anti-Tokugawa military objectives. This left Utsunomiya in the hands of Tadatomo's retired predecessor, Toda Tadayuki, who also advocated surrender, but was not involved in the efforts of the former Shogunate.

== Events leading to the battle ==
In the days prior to the attack, the former Shogunate forces were moving quickly in the area from castle to castle, with Hijikata taking two domains in Hitachi Province—Shimotsuma and Shimodate—on May 7 and May 8. However, as these domains were small and their daimyō had fled, they did not have much in terms of money or supplies, and Hijikata was unable to acquire what he had hoped for. Almost simultaneously, a peasant riot broke out in Utsunomiya, giving the former Shogunate forces the perfect opportunity to strike, which they seized without delay. Ōtori's forces launched their attack on the castle on the morning of May 10, 1868, facing off against the combined imperial force made up of troops from Matsumoto (Shinano Province, 60,000 koku), Kurobane (Shimotsuke Province, 18,000 koku), Mibu (Shimotsuke Province, 18,000 koku), Iwamurata (Shinano Province, 18,000 koku), Susaka (Shinano Province, 12,000 koku), Hikone (Ōmi Province, 350,000 koku), Ōgaki (Mino Province, 100,000 koku), Utsunomiya (Shimotsuke Province, 77,000 koku), and Kasama (Hitachi Province, 80,000 koku). The castle fell the same day, with Toda Tadayuki escaping to Tatebayashi. Ōtori, leading the main element of the army, entered the castle. His forces handed out the castle's supply of rice to the townsfolk who, as previously noted, had been rioting for the past several days.

Efforts were then made to strengthen the position of Ōtori's force. Ōtori's men, now linked up with Hijikata's force, including others such as former Shinsengumi member Nagakura Shinpachi's unit, Seiheitai, headed north to Mibu, where they intended to hide and lie in wait; however, upon their arrival they discovered that Satsuma forces had already taken the castle. The Satsuma troops, shocked at the sudden appearance of the enemy, withdrew into Mibu Castle and mounted a defense; and while the attackers had intended to set fire to the castle town, a torrential rain began, and made that impossible. Despite their best efforts, this combined unit was not able to take Mibu Castle, and withdrew to Utsunomiya after sustaining a total of 60 men killed and wounded, including eight officers.

From the south, the imperial army, with Satsuma and Ōgaki forces leading the way, swept up in a northeastward direction over the Mibu-kaidō road on May 14, launching a counterattack which resulted in the re-capture of Utsunomiya Castle on the same day. Faced with defeat, Ōtori's forces withdrew northward, by way of Nikkō, on to Aizu.

== Aftermath ==
While the Aizu domain previously advocated surrender and peaceful negotiation first and resistance second, the entrance of massive numbers of loyalists to the former Shogunate, following their retreat from Utsunomiya, forced its hand firmly into the realm of armed resistance:

... soldiers of the Shogunate, who supported continued war, began decamping en masse and leaving Edo for Aizu, which necessitated Aizu's stance to be changed to one that was pro-war. Men such as senior councilor Saigō Tanomo and agriculture magistrate Kawahara Zenzaemon continued to push for allegiance and submission, however, they were not heard, and the clouds of war spread over northeastern Japan ...

In later years, Ōtori wrote an account of the battle, titled "Nanka Kikō" (南柯紀行), which appeared in Kyū Bakufu (舊幕府), a magazine he helped edit and which was devoted to documenting Bakumatsu history.
