= Utsunomiya Castle =

Castle in Utsunomiya, Japan

Coordinates: 36°33′16″N 139°53′09″E

Utsunomiya Castle 宇都宮城
- Utsunomiya, Tochigi Prefecture, Japan
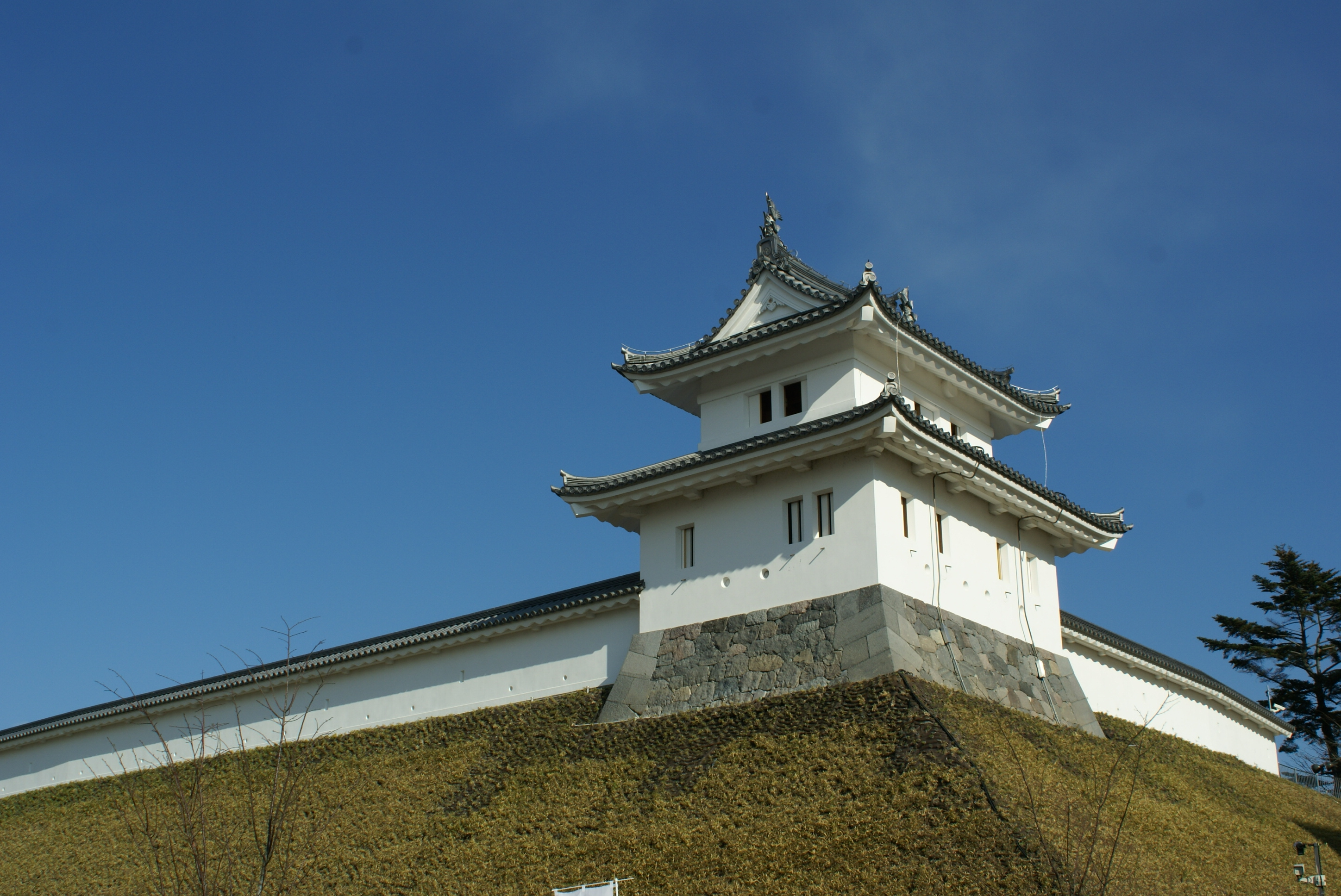
- Reconstructed Fujimi Yagura (watchtower) at Utsunomiya Castle

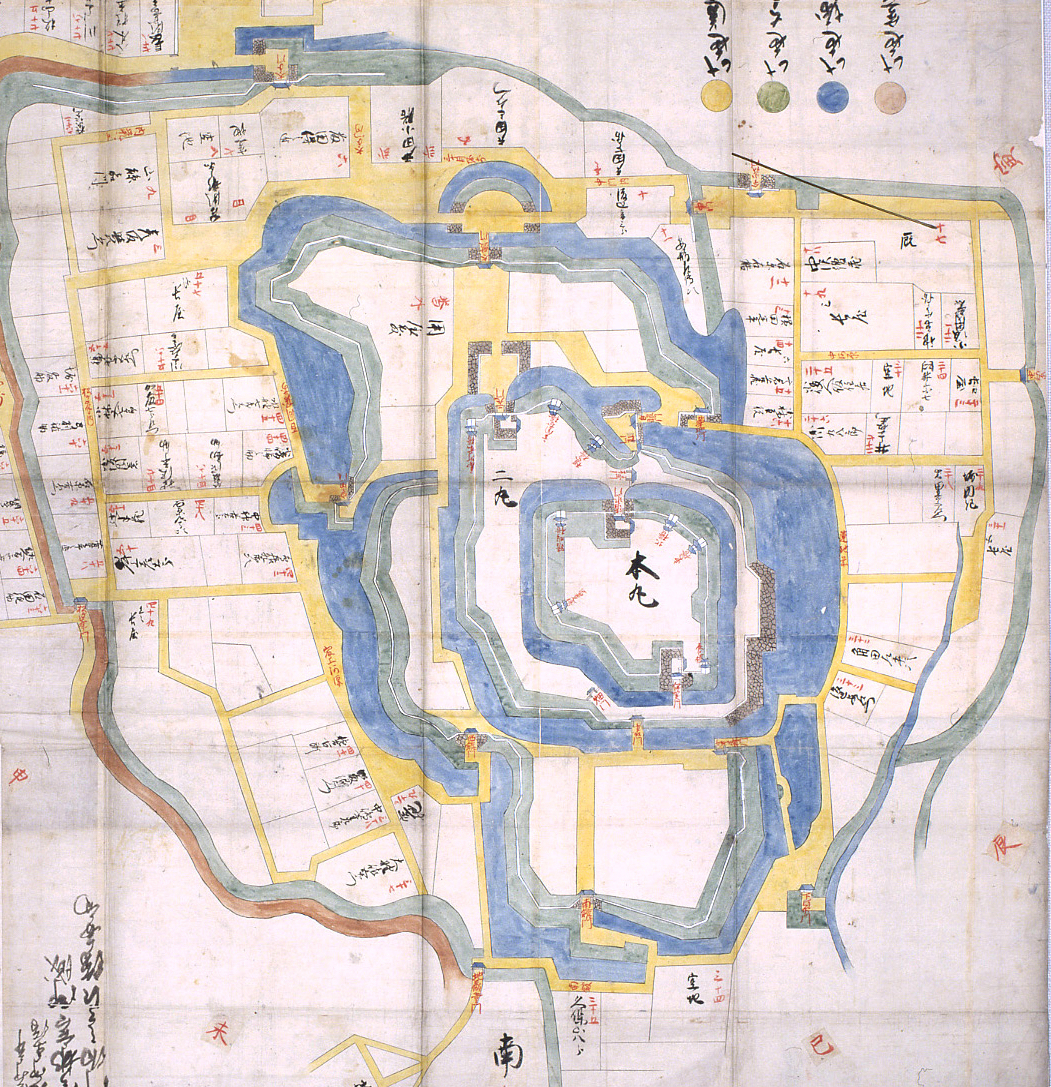
- Edo-period map of Utsunomiya Castle

Site information
- Type: flatland-style Japanese castle
- Open to the public: yes

Location
- Location within Tochigi Prefecture Location within Japan

Site history
- Built: late Heian period
- In use: Sengoku-1889
- Battles/wars: Battle of Utsunomiya Castle

Utsunomiya Castle (宇都宮城, Utsunomiya-jō) is a Japanese castle located in Utsunomiya, central Tochigi Prefecture, Japan. At the end of the Edo period, Utsunomiya Castle was home to a branch of the Toda clan, daimyō of Utsunomiya Domain.

== History ==
=== Early history ===
Utsunomiya Castle was first built in the Heian period by either Fujiwara Hidesato or Fujiwara Sōen around the year 1063. This castle was built on a small hill south of Utsunomiya Futarayama Jinja, the ichinomiya of Shimotsuke Province, on a juncture of the Ōshū Kaidō and the Nikkō Kaidō highways. Fujiwara Sōen played an important role in the Former Nine Years War and was the ancestor of the Utsunomiya clan, who dominated the area for the next 500 years, through the Kamakura and Muromachi periods. During the Sengoku period, the castle was greatly enlarged, enclosing an area over four kilometers in diameter with a series of concentric moats and high earthen ramparts, and came to be renowned as one of the seven major castles of the Kantō region. The Utsunomiya successfully defended the castle against repeated attacks by the Odawara Hōjō clan. However, the Utsunomiya clan was dispossessed of their holdings in 1597 by Toyotomi Hideyoshi, and the castle came under the control of the Gamo clan, based in Aizu. With the establishment of the Tokugawa shogunate, Utsunomiya Castle became the center of Utsunomiya Domain, ruled by a succession of daimyo clans, beginning with the Okudaira in 1601.

In 1619, Honda Masazumi was appointed daimyo of Utsunomiya. Assisted by an able administrative staff, he largely reconstructed the castle and hosted Shōgun Tokugawa Hidetada in the new palace when the shōgun was on his way to worship at the Nikkō Tōshō-gū. However, Honda Masazumi was accused in 1622 by his political enemies on trumped-up charges of planning to assassinate the shōgun using a trap with a falling ceiling in the shogunal guest chamber, and was exiled to Dewa Province (the incident was romanticized in the film The Ceiling at Utsunomiya, directed by Nobuo Nakagawa in 1956). Finally this Ni-no-maru Palace burned down in 1683.

During the Boshin War of 1868, Utsunomiya Domain sided with the Imperial cause but came under attack by a pro-Tokugawa army led by Ōtori Keisuke and former Shinsengumi leader Hijikata Toshizō. The castle fell to the pro-Tokugawa forces after a fierce battle during which most of the structures were destroyed. Unable to hold the castle due to their limited numbers, the pro-Shogunal army soon abandoned the site and moved north.

Following the establishment of the Meiji government, the site of the castle was used as a garrison location for the Imperial Japanese Army until 1890, when it was given over to private hands, with the central portion becoming a public park. In 2007, a large section of the walls, moats and two yagura on the site of the central bailey were reconstructed.

== Literature ==
- De Lange, William (2021). An Encyclopedia of Japanese Castles. Groningen: Toyo Press. pp. 600 pages. ISBN 978-9492722300.
- Schmorleitz, Morton S. (1974). Castles in Japan. Tokyo: Charles E. Tuttle Co. pp. 144–145. ISBN 0-8048-1102-4.
- Motoo, Hinago (1986). Japanese Castles. Tokyo: Kodansha. p. 200 pages. ISBN 0-87011-766-1.
- Mitchelhill, Jennifer (2004). Castles of the Samurai: Power and Beauty. Tokyo: Kodansha. p. 112 pages. ISBN 4-7700-2954-3.
- Turnbull, Stephen (2003). Japanese Castles 1540-1640. Osprey Publishing. p. 64 pages. ISBN 1-84176-429-9.
