= Kiyoshi Igarashi =

Japanese politician

- 五十嵐 清
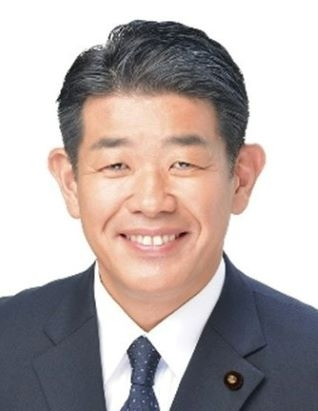
- Official portrait, 2024

Member of the House of Representatives; from Northern Kanto
- Incumbent
- Assumed office 1 November 2021
- Preceded by: Multi-member district
- Constituency: PR block (2021–2026); Tochigi 2nd (2026–present)

Member of the Tochigi Prefectural Assembly
- In office 2003–2021
- Constituency: Oyama & Nogi

Personal details
- Born: 14 December 1969 (age 56) Oyama, Tochigi, Japan
- Party: Liberal Democratic
- Education: Bond University
- Website: Kiyoshi Igarashi website

Kiyoshi Igarashi (五十嵐 清, Igarashi Kiyoshi; born 14 December 1969) is a Japanese politician of the Liberal Democratic Party, who serves as a member of the House of Representatives.

== Early years ==
Igarashi was born in Oyama City, Tochigi Prefecture. After graduating from the Faculty of Business at Bond University in 1993, he served as a secretary to several Diet members — Toshimitsu Motegi, Tsutomu Sato, and Junzo Iwasaki — for approximately ten years.

== Political career ==
In 2003, Igarashi ran for the Tochigi Prefectural Assembly and won.

In June 2021, the LDP Tochigi Prefectural Federation selected Igarashi as Tochigi 2nd district candidate following a recruitment process.

In Tochigi 2nd, Yasuo Nishikawa — a member of the Tochigi Prefectural Assembly and the eldest son of igarashi's predecessor, Koya Nishikawa — also expressed his intention to run. While there was talk of a split election, a compromise was eventually reached to run Igarashi as Tochigi 2nd's candidate and Nishikawa as a PR candidate.

In the 2021 general election, Igarashi lost to Akio Fukuda (CDP) and won a seat in the PR block. Meanwhile, Nishikawa lost the election because he was placed low on the party list.

In the 2024 LDP presidential election, Igarashi voted for Toshimitsu Motegi in first round and voted for Sanae Takaichi in run-off vote.

In the 2024 general election, Igarashi lost to Fukuda and won a seat in the PR block.

In November 2024, Igarashi was appointed to Parliamentary Vice-Minister for the Environment in Second Ishiba cabinet.

In the 2026 general election, Igarashi defeated CRA's Fukuda and gained Tochigi 2nd's seat.
