= Akizuki Noborinosuke =

Japanese samurai

- Born: 1842
- Died: January 6, 1885 (aged 42–43)
- Burial place: Kōtoku-ji
- Military career
- Era: Edo

Akizuki Noborinosuke (秋月 登之助; 1842 – January 6, 1885) was a Japanese samurai of the late Edo period, who served as a retainer of the Aizu domain. Also known as Egami Tarō (江上 太郎), Akizuki fought in the Boshin War, both in the Aizu army as well as the army of the former Shogunate. He is notable for his service as a senior officer under Hijikata Toshizo at the Battle of Utsunomiya Castle. While he survived the Boshin War, the details of his death are unknown.

Akizuki's grave is at Kōtoku-ji, in Aizuwakamatsu.
