= Eiichi Sato =

Japanese mayor

- 佐藤 栄一

Mayor of Utsunomiya
- Incumbent
- Assumed office 29 November 2004
- Preceded by: Tomikazu Fukuda

Personal details
- Born: 5 October 1961 (age 64) Utsunomiya, Tochigi, Japan
- Party: Independent
- Education: Meiji University

Eiichi Sato (佐藤 栄一, Satō Eiichi; born 5 October 1961) is the mayor of Utsunomiya, Tochigi in Japan. A graduate of Meiji University, he has been serving his first term of mayor since 29 November 2004.
