= Akio Fukuda =

Japanese politician (born 1948)

- 福田 昭夫
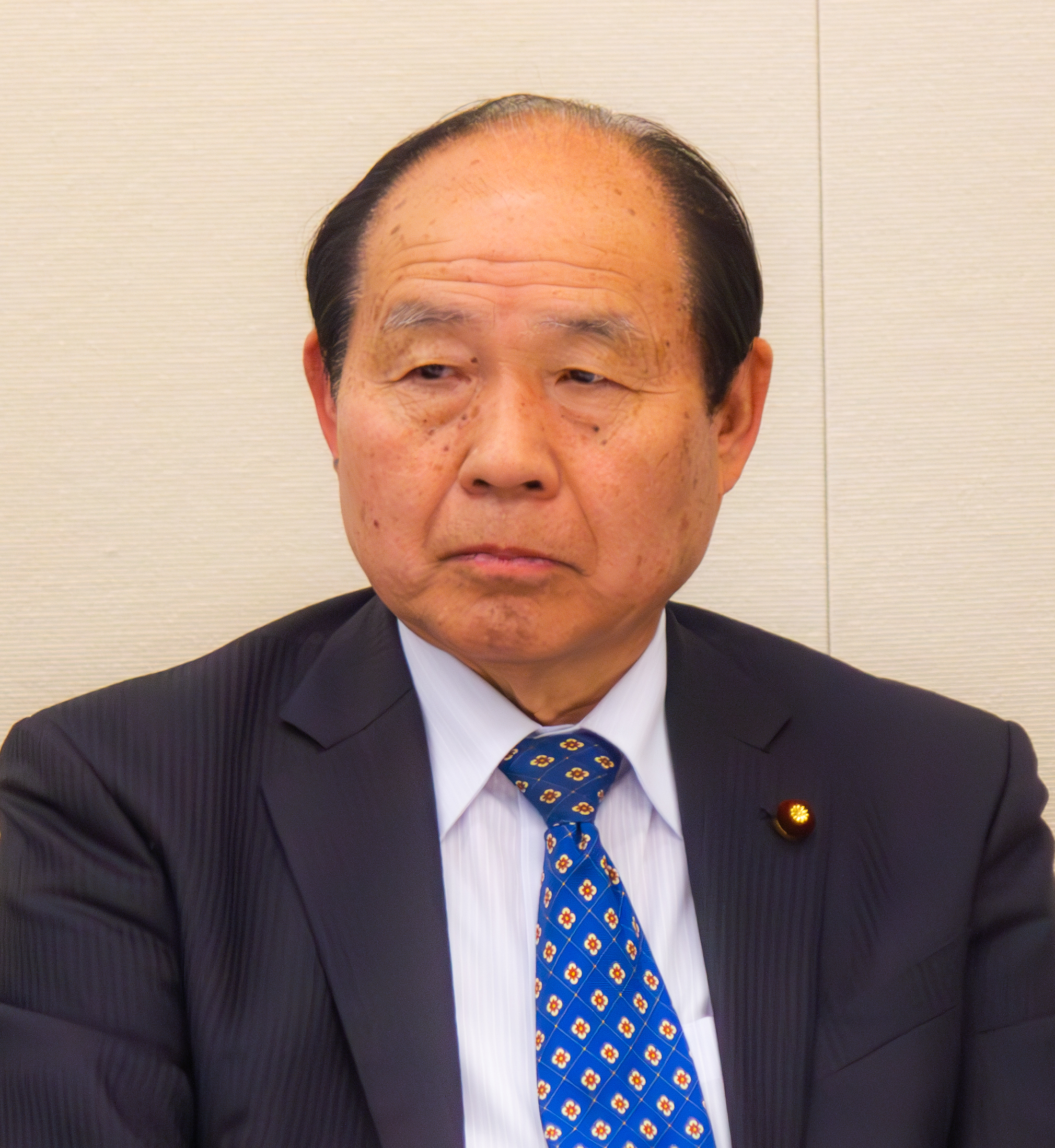
- Fukuda in 2025

Member of the House of Representatives; from Northern Kanto
- In office 11 September 2005 – 23 January 2026
- Preceded by: Multi-member district
- Succeeded by: Kiyoshi Igarashi
- Constituency: PR block (2005–2009); Tochigi 2nd (2009–2012); PR block (2012–2014); Tochigi 2nd (2014–2026)

Governor of Tochigi Prefecture
- In office 9 December 2000 – 8 December 2004
- Monarch: Akihito
- Preceded by: Fumio Watanabe
- Succeeded by: Tomikazu Fukuda

Mayor of Imaichi
- In office 21 April 1991 – 20 September 2000
- Preceded by: Masajirō Inose
- Succeeded by: Fumio Saitō

Personal details
- Born: 17 April 1948 (age 78) Kawachi, Tochigi, Japan
- Party: Independent
- Other political affiliations: Independent (1991–2005); DPJ (2005–2016); DP (2016–2018); CDP (2018–2026); CRA (2026)
- Education: Tohoku University
- Website: Official website

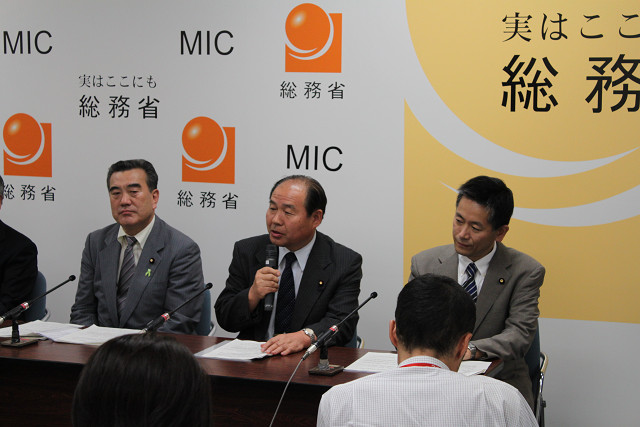
Fukuda (centre) talking in a press conference, September 2011.

Akio Fukuda (福田 昭夫, Fukuda Akio; born 17 April 1948) is a Japanese politician of the Constitutional Democratic Party and a member of the House of Representatives in the Diet (national legislature). A native of Imaichi, Tochigi and graduate of Tohoku University, he joined the city government of Imaichi in 1971 and became the mayor of the city in 1991, serving for three terms. He was elected to be the governor of Tochigi Prefecture in 2000 but lost his re-election in 2004. In 2005, he was elected to the House of Representatives for the first time.

In the February 2026 election, Fukuda was the candidate of the newly formed Centrist Reform Alliance in Tochigi 2nd district, but lost to Liberal Democratic Party candidate Kiyoshi Igarashi. He subsequently left the alliance, criticising the decision to form a new party and the placement of Komeito-affiliated candidates at the top of the party’s proportional representation lists.
