= Utsunomiya =

Utsunomiya 宇都宮市
- Prefecture capital and Core city
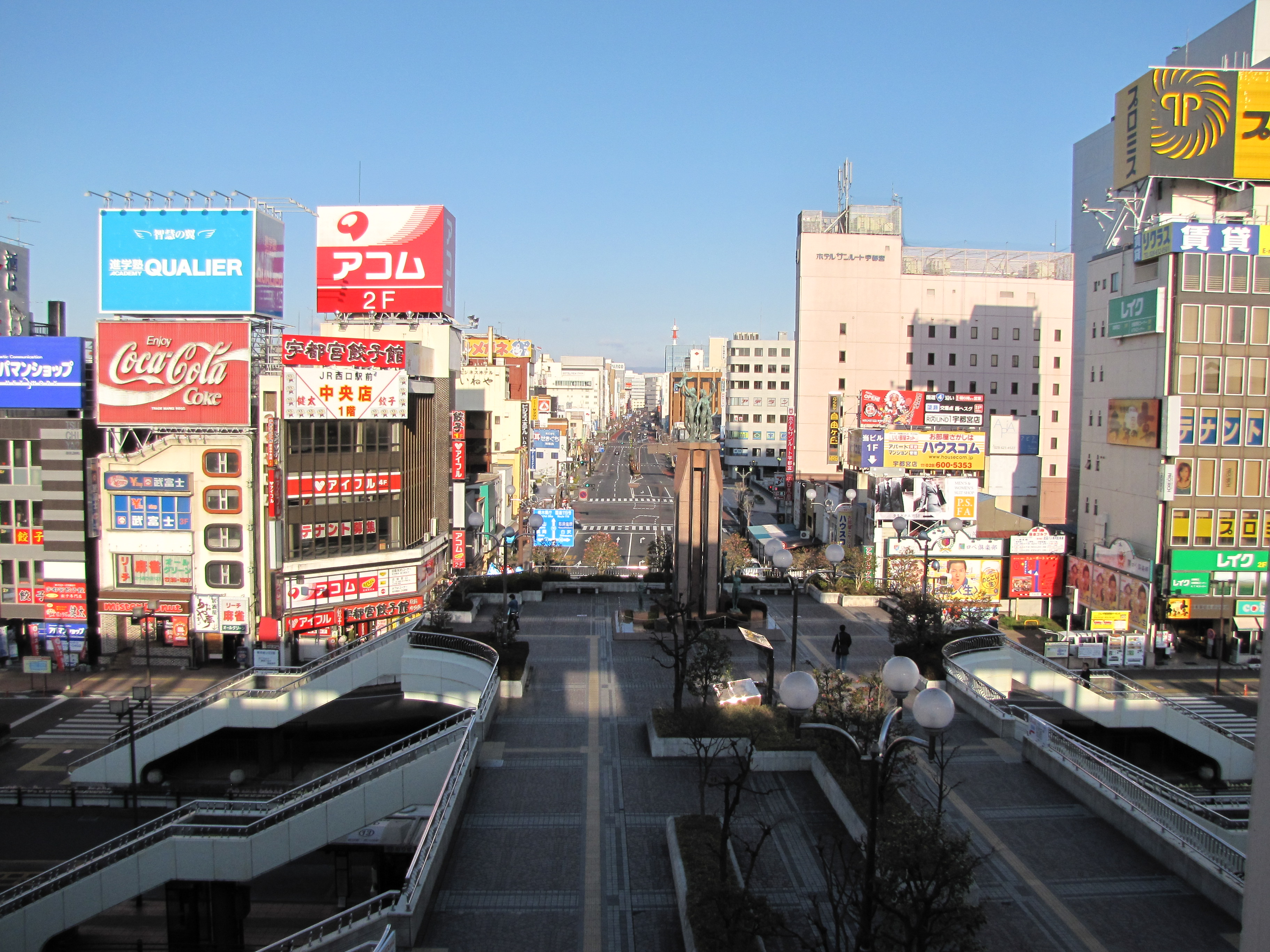
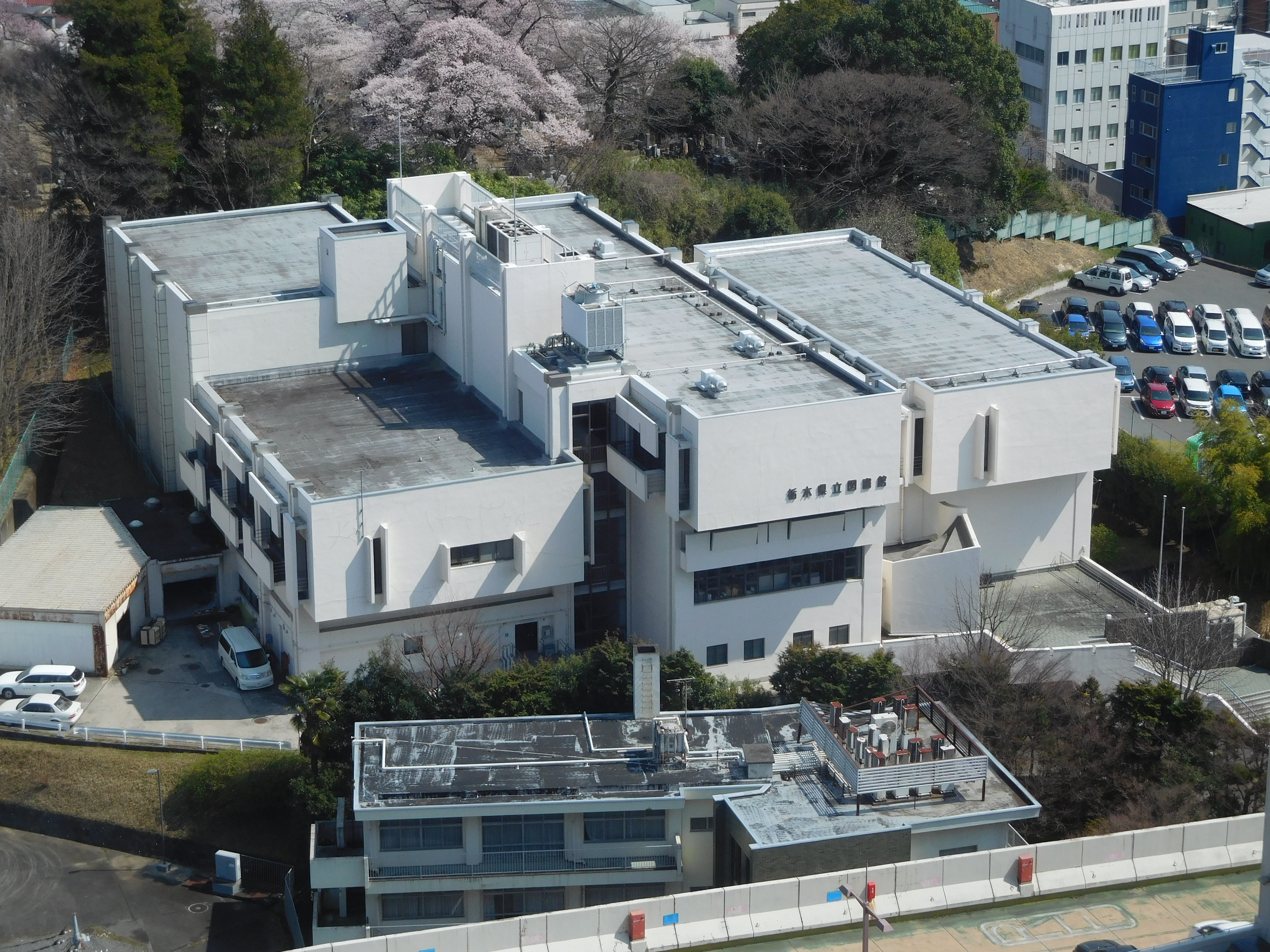
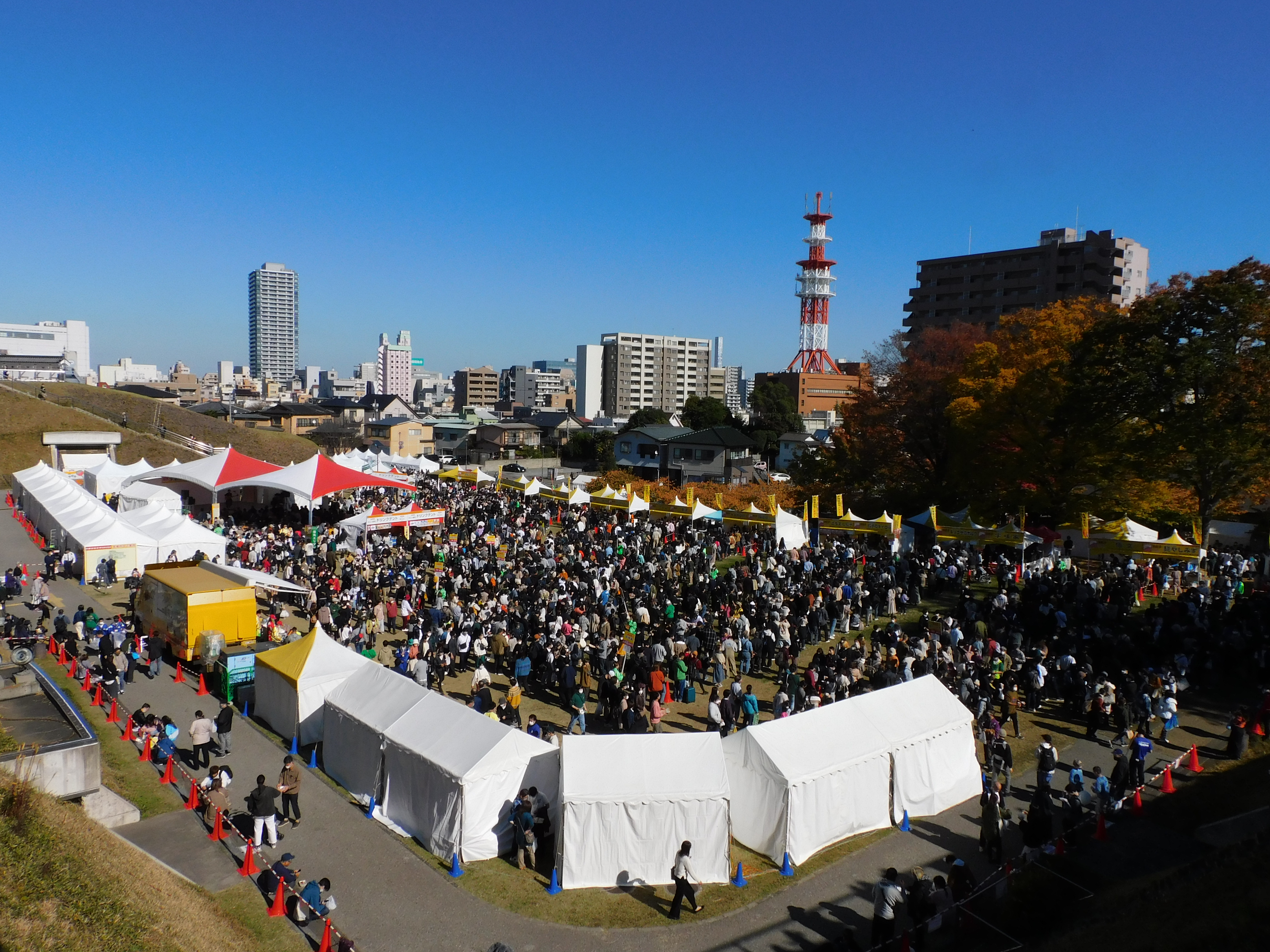
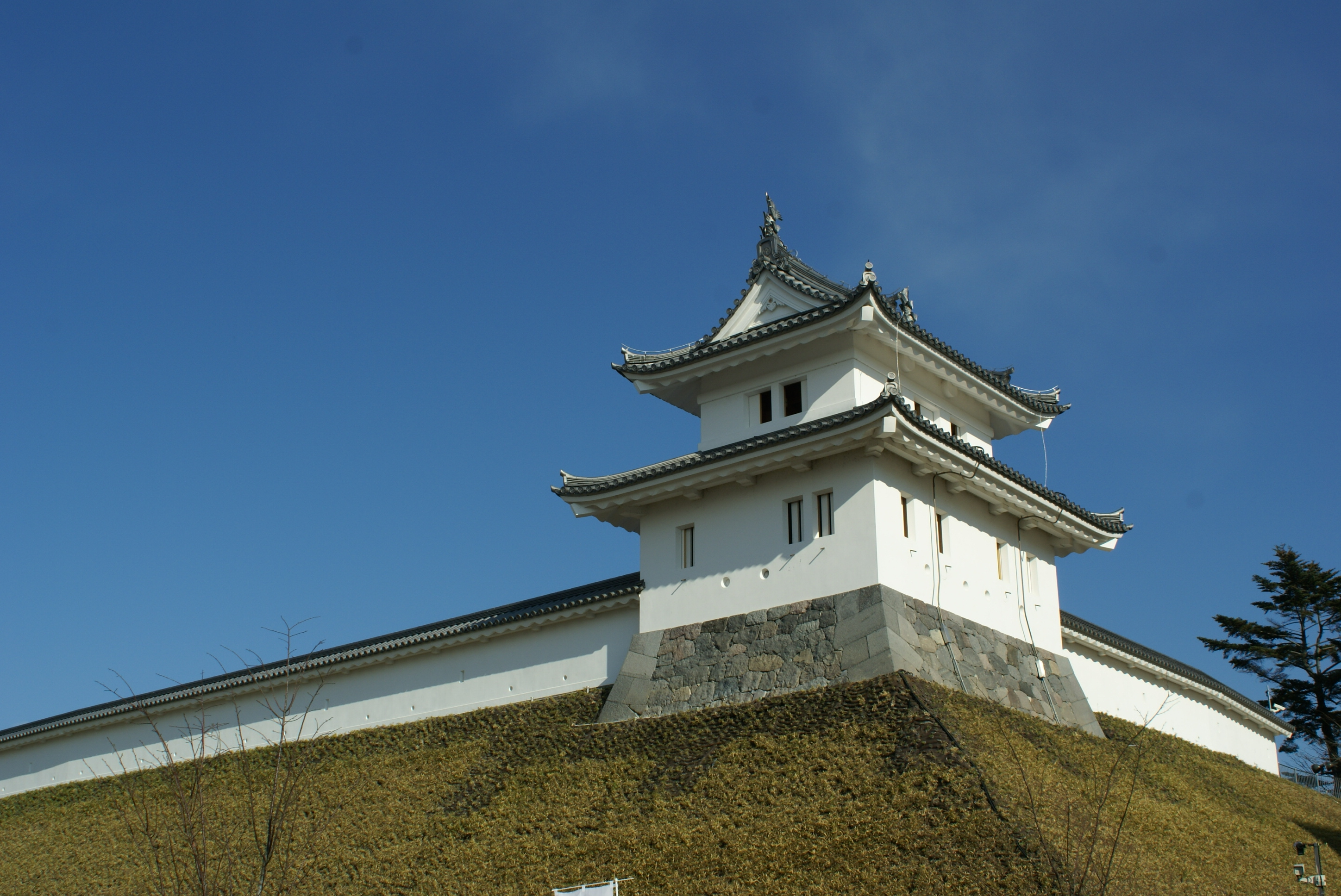
- City view from Utsunomiya Station Tochigi Prefectural Library Utsunomiya Gyoza Festival (in 2022) Utsunomiya Castle Oya Stone Museum Utsunomiya Light Rail

- Flag Seal

- Location of Utsunomiya in Tochigi Prefecture

- Coordinates: 36°33′18″N 139°52′57″E
- Country: Japan
- Region: Kantō
- Prefecture: Tochigi
- First official recorded: 353 AD
- City Settled: April 1, 1896

Government
  - Mayor: Eiichi Sato

Area
  - Prefecture capital and Core city: 416.85 km^{2} (160.95 sq mi)

Population (July 1, 2023)
  - Prefecture capital and Core city: 513,584
  - Density: 1,232.1/km^{2} (3,191.0/sq mi)
  - Metro (2015): 1,103,745 (15th)
- Time zone: UTC+9 (Japan Standard Time)
- Phone number: 028-632-2222
- Address: 1-1-5, Asahi, Utsunomiya-shi, Tochigi-ken 320-8540
- Climate: Cfa
- Website: Official website
- Symbols
- Flower: Satsuki azalea
- Tree: Ginkgo biloba

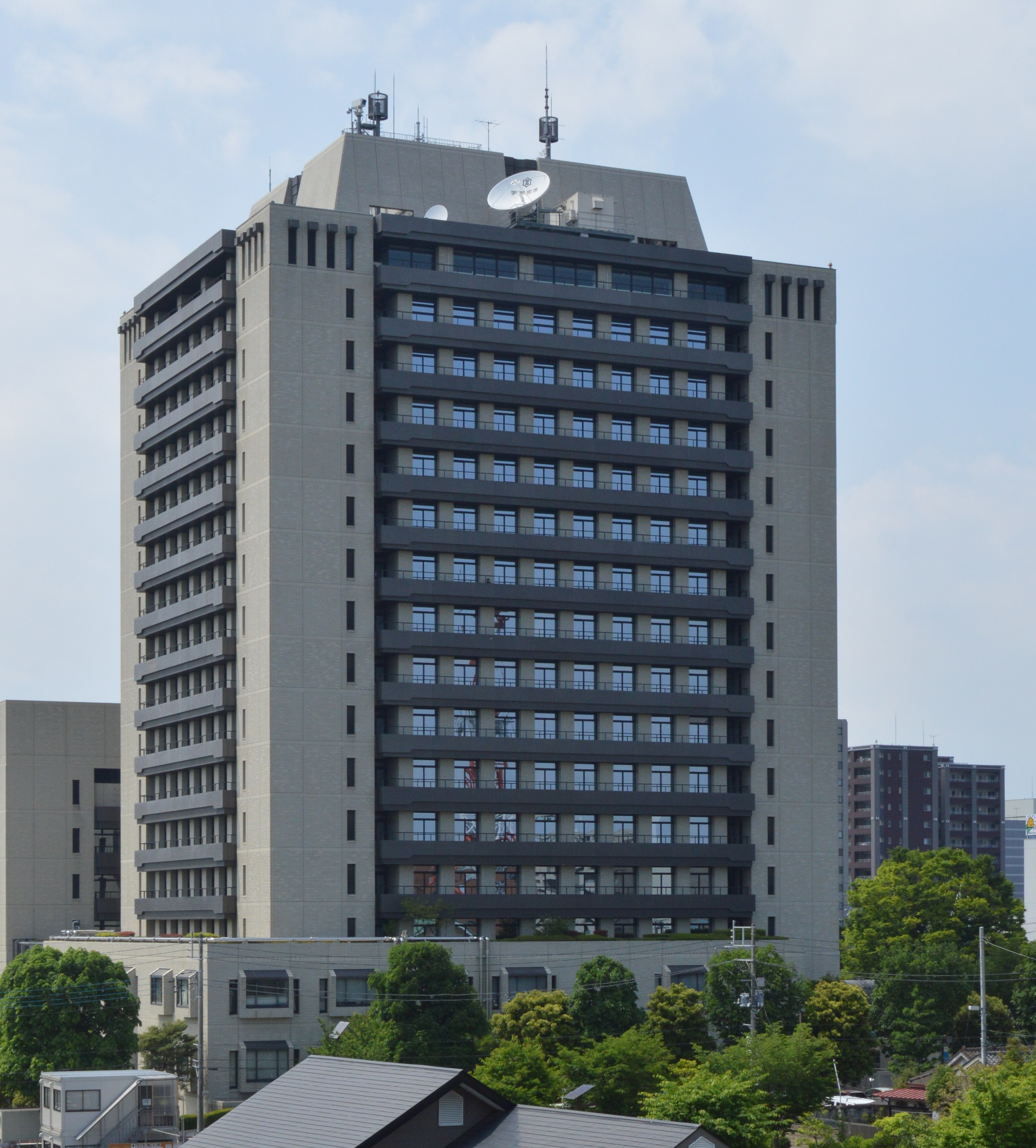
Utsunomiya City Hall

Utsunomiya (宇都宮市, Utsunomiya-shi; [ɯ̈̀.t͡sɨ́.nó̞.mí.jä́(.ɕì)]) is the capital and largest city of Tochigi Prefecture in the northern Kantō region of Japan. As of 1 July 2023, the city had an estimated population of 513,584, and a population density of 1,232 persons per square kilometre (3,190/sq mi). The total area of the city is 416.85 km^{2} (160.95 sq mi). Utsunomiya is famous for its gyoza (pan fried dumplings). There are more than two hundred gyoza restaurants in Utsunomiya.

Greater Utsunomiya (宇都宮都市圏, Utsunomiya Toshi-ken) had a population of 888,005 in the 2000 census. The nearby city of Oyama is included in Greater Tokyo, but Greater Utsunomiya is not, despite the two areas amalgamating somewhat. It is the 10th most populated city in the Kantō region.

== Geography ==
Utsunomiya is located in south-central Tochigi Prefecture in the northern Kantō plains. It is approximately 100 km (60 mi) north of Tokyo. The historic town of Nikkō is approximately 25 km (15 mi) northwest of Utsunomiya. The average elevation of the city is 100 metres (330 ft).

=== Surrounding municipalities ===
Tochigi Prefecture

- Kaminokawa
- Kanuma
- Mibu
- Mooka
- Nikkō
- Sakura
- Shimotsuke
- Shioya
- Takanezawa

=== Climate ===
Utsunomiya has a humid subtropical climate (Köppen climate classification Cfa) with hot and humid summers and cool winters. The average annual temperature in Utsunomiya is 14.3 °C (57.7 °F). The average annual rainfall is 1,524.7 mm (60.03 in) with September as the wettest month. The temperatures are highest on average in August, at around 26.0 °C (78.8 °F), and lowest in January, at around 2.8 °C (37.0 °F).

Climate data for Utsunomiya (1991−2020 normals, extremes 1890−present)
Month	Jan	Feb	Mar	Apr	May	Jun	Jul	Aug	Sep	Oct	Nov	Dec	Year
Record high °C (°F)	21.0 (69.8)	24.6 (76.3)	27.2 (81.0)	30.4 (86.7)	34.4 (93.9)	37.6 (99.7)	38.7 (101.7)	37.5 (99.5)	36.5 (97.7)	33.5 (92.3)	25.1 (77.2)	24.7 (76.5)	38.7 (101.7)
Mean maximum °C (°F)	14.2 (57.6)	17.8 (64.0)	21.9 (71.4)	26.7 (80.1)	30.0 (86.0)	32.8 (91.0)	35.4 (95.7)	35.9 (96.6)	33.4 (92.1)	28.1 (82.6)	21.9 (71.4)	17.0 (62.6)	36.5 (97.7)
Mean daily maximum °C (°F)	8.6 (47.5)	9.7 (49.5)	13.4 (56.1)	18.8 (65.8)	23.3 (73.9)	25.9 (78.6)	29.5 (85.1)	30.9 (87.6)	27.0 (80.6)	21.4 (70.5)	15.9 (60.6)	10.8 (51.4)	19.6 (67.3)
Daily mean °C (°F)	2.8 (37.0)	3.8 (38.8)	7.4 (45.3)	12.8 (55.0)	17.8 (64.0)	21.2 (70.2)	24.8 (76.6)	26.0 (78.8)	22.4 (72.3)	16.7 (62.1)	10.6 (51.1)	5.1 (41.2)	14.3 (57.7)
Mean daily minimum °C (°F)	−2.2 (28.0)	−1.3 (29.7)	2.1 (35.8)	7.4 (45.3)	13.0 (55.4)	17.4 (63.3)	21.4 (70.5)	22.5 (72.5)	18.8 (65.8)	12.6 (54.7)	5.7 (42.3)	0.2 (32.4)	9.8 (49.6)
Mean minimum °C (°F)	−6.0 (21.2)	−5.6 (21.9)	−2.9 (26.8)	0.5 (32.9)	6.6 (43.9)	12.3 (54.1)	17.5 (63.5)	18.4 (65.1)	12.6 (54.7)	5.7 (42.3)	−0.3 (31.5)	−4.4 (24.1)	−6.4 (20.5)
Record low °C (°F)	−14.8 (5.4)	−13.3 (8.1)	−12.4 (9.7)	−6.4 (20.5)	−0.8 (30.6)	4.7 (40.5)	10.3 (50.5)	11.4 (52.5)	5.5 (41.9)	−2.7 (27.1)	−6.7 (19.9)	−10.9 (12.4)	−14.8 (5.4)
Average precipitation mm (inches)	37.5 (1.48)	38.5 (1.52)	87.7 (3.45)	121.5 (4.78)	149.2 (5.87)	175.2 (6.90)	215.4 (8.48)	198.5 (7.81)	217.2 (8.55)	174.4 (6.87)	71.1 (2.80)	38.5 (1.52)	1,524.7 (60.03)
Average snowfall cm (inches)	7 (2.8)	8 (3.1)	2 (0.8)	0 (0)	0 (0)	0 (0)	0 (0)	0 (0)	0 (0)	0 (0)	0 (0)	1 (0.4)	18 (7.1)
Average precipitation days (≥ 0.5 mm)	4.3	5.5	9.6	11.2	12.4	14.9	16.0	13.8	13.6	11.4	7.1	4.7	124.4
Average relative humidity (%)	61	59	60	64	69	76	79	78	77	74	71	66	70
Mean monthly sunshine hours	211.7	193.3	194.2	184.9	175.4	118.5	118.9	140.9	119.8	140.3	165.9	197.4	1,961.1
Source: Japan Meteorological Agency

=== Demographics ===
Per Japanese census data, the population of Utsunomiya has recently plateaued after decades of strong growth.

Historical population
Year	Pop.	±%
1950	235,516	—
1960	261,964	+11.2%
1970	324,216	+23.8%
1980	408,908	+26.1%
1990	465,162	+13.8%
2000	487,560	+4.8%
2010	511,296	+4.9%
2020	518,757	+1.5%

== History ==
Archaeologists have uncovered evidence that the area of Utsunomiya has been continuously settled since the Japanese Paleolithic period onwards, and numerous burial mounds from the Kofun period are found within its borders. The Utsunomiya Futarasan Shrine (宇都宮二荒山神社), which is the Ichinomiya of Shimotsuke Province claims to have been founded in 353 AD. The town of Utsunomiya developed around this shrine, and the area was under the control of the Utsunomiya clan, an offshoot of the Fujiwara clan from the Heian through Sengoku periods, and was destroyed by Toyotomi Hideyoshi.

During the Edo period, the Utsunomiya area was ruled by a succession of daimyō clans under Utsunomiya Domain, and prospered from its location at the junction of the Nikkō Kaidō and the Ōshū Kaidō. During the Bakumatsu period Boshin War, the Battle of Utsunomiya Castle was a major conflict in the northern Kantō area. Following the Meiji restoration, Utsunomiya was briefly (1871–1873) part of Utsunomiya Prefecture, which was then merged into the new Tochigi Prefecture, and became the capital of the prefecture in 1884. Utsunomiya became an important garrison for the Imperial Japanese Army.

With the establishment of the municipalities system on April 1, 1889, the town of Utsunomiya was officially established. At the end of 1889, Utsunomiya had a population of 30,698 making it the third most populous municipality in the Kantō area, after Tokyo and Yokohama. Utsunomiya was raised to city status on April 1, 1896. On July 12, 1945, much of Utsunomiya and the surrounding areas were destroyed in the American Bombing of Utsunomiya during World War II.

The city limits were expanded from 1951 to 1955 by annexing neighboring Suzumenomiya town and Hiraishi, Yokokawa, Mizuhono, Kunimoto, Shiroyama, Tomiya, Toyosato, and Sugatagawa villages and the part of Shinoi village from Kawachi District and Kiyohara village from Haga District. In 1996, Utsunomiya was designated a core city with increased autonomy. On March 31, 2007, Utsunomiya absorbed the towns of Kamikawachi and Kawachi (both from Kawachi District), pushing the population of Utsunomiya City over 500,000.

== Government ==
Utsunomiya has a mayor-council form of government with a directly elected mayor and a unicameral city legislature of 45 members. Utsunomiya, together with the town of Kamikawa collectively contributes 13 members to the Tochigi Prefectural Assembly. In terms of national politics, the city is divided between the Tochigi 1st district and Tochigi 2nd district of the lower house of the Diet of Japan.

== Economy ==
Utsunomiya is the commercial and industrial center of Tochigi Prefecture. Utsunomiya is home to a Canon optical manufacturing plant, a Japan Tobacco plant, Honda design centers, and various other industrial concerns in the Kiyohara Industrial Park. In addition, one of the largest malls in the north Kantō region, Bell Mall is located near central Utsunomiya.

There are six industrial complexes located in Utsunomiya, in addition to Kiyohara Industrial Park, one of the largest industrial parks in Japan.

== Education ==
- Bunsei University of Art
- Sakushin Gakuin University
- Utsunomiya Kyowa University
- Utsunomiya Junior College
- Utsunomiya Kaisei
- Utsunomiya University
- Teikyo University Utsunomiya campus
- Utsunomiya has 68 public elementary schools and 25 public junior high schools operated by the city government as well as one junior high school operated by the prefectural government and one elementary school and one junior high school by the national government. In addition, there is one private elementary school and four private junior high schools. The city has ten public high schools operated by the Tochigi Prefectural Board of Education. There are also five private high schools. In addition, Tochigi Prefecture also operates eight special education schools for the handicapped.

== Transportation ==
=== Railway ===
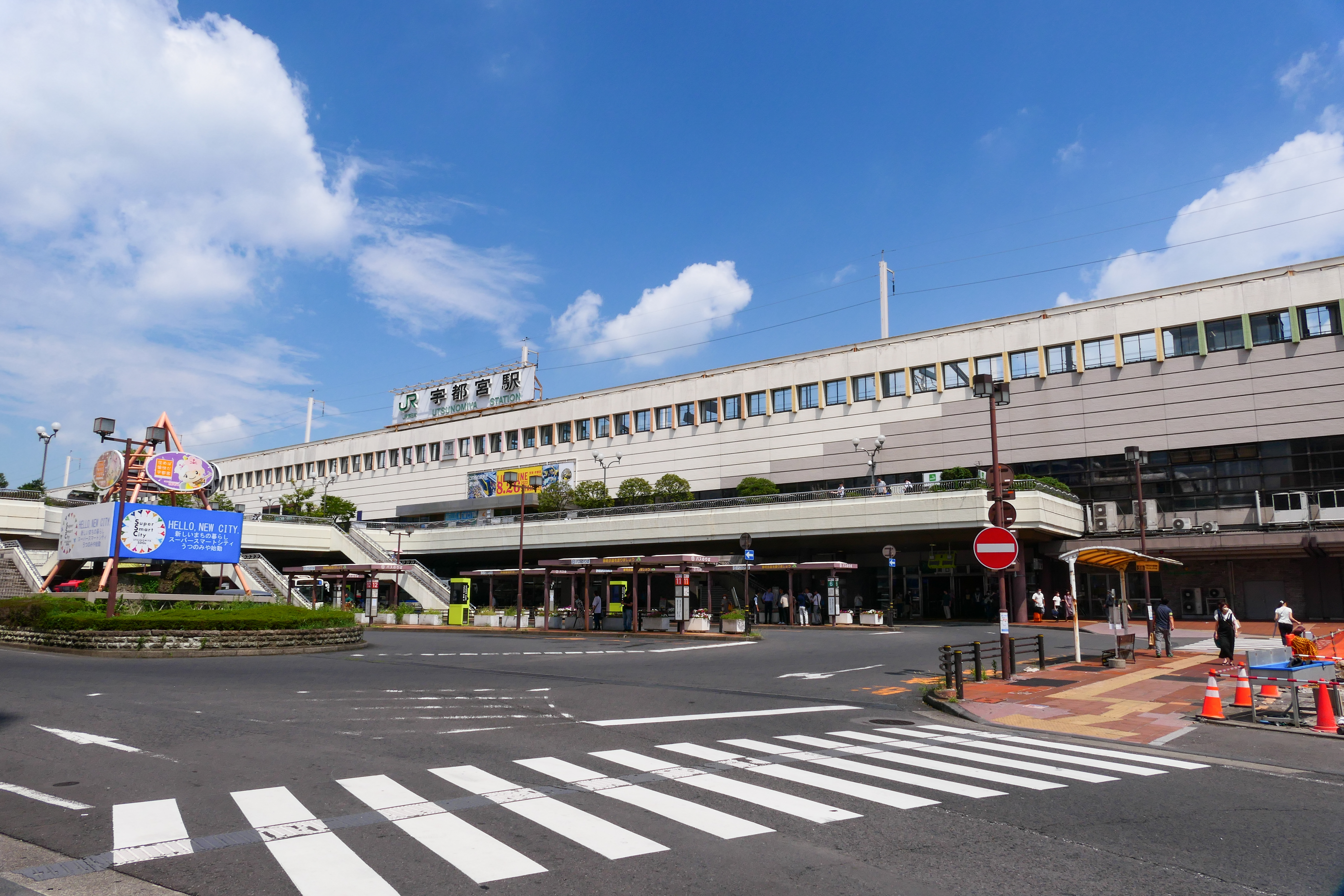
Utsunomiya Station West Exit (August 2023)

Utsunomiya is served by the high-speed Tohoku Shinkansen line from Tokyo, as well as a number of suburban lines operated by East Japan Railway Company (JR East) and the private railway operator Tobu Railway.

JR East – Tohoku Shinkansen

- Utsunomiya

JR East – Tohoku Main Line (Utsunomiya Line/Shōnan-Shinjuku Line/Ueno-Tokyo Line)

- Suzumenomiya - Utsunomiya - Okamoto

JR East – Nikkō Line

- Tsuruta - Utsunomiya

JR East – Karasuyama Line

- Utsunomiya - Karasuyama

Tobu Railway - Tobu Utsunomiya Line

- Nishi-Kawada - Esojima - Minami-Utsunomiya - Tōbu Utsunomiya

Construction of a light rail transit system, Utsunomiya Light Rail, connecting Utsunomiya railway station with the neighbouring town of Haga was approved in 2016, with completion originally scheduled for December 2019. The network started operation on August 26, 2023 and Utsunomiya became the first city in Japan to have a new tram system in 75 years after Takaoka, Toyama.

Map of the Utsunomiya Haga Light Rail Line operated by Utsunomiya Light Rail Co., Ltd.

=== Highways ===
- Tōhoku Expressway
- Kita-Kantō Expressway
- Nikkō Utsunomiya Road
- National Route 4
- National Route 119
- National Route 121
- National Route 123
- National Route 293
- National Route 408

=== Air ===
The nearest airports to the city are Tokyo's Haneda Airport and Narita International Airport which both can be reached within 2 hours by road.

== Local attractions ==
- site of Utsunomiya Castle
- site of Tobuyama Castle
- Ōya-ji – a Buddhist temple including a museum with artifacts dating back to the Jōmon Period.
- Official Utsunomiya City Tourism Website

== Sports ==
- 1990 UCI Road World Championships took place in Utsunomiya.
- Utsunomiya is represented in the J. League of football with its local club Tochigi SC.
- Kiyohara Baseball Stadium
- The Utsunomiya Brex are part of Japan's main basketball league, the B.League
- Tochigi Green Stadium
- Utsunomiya Velodrome - Utsunomiya is the host city of the Japan Cup, a UCI-sanctioned cycling race.

== Culture ==
=== Utsunomiya's famous dumplings ===
==== History of Gyoza ====
Following the Second World War, Japanese soldiers who returned from Manchuria brought home to Utsunomiya gyoza recipes that originated from China. Soon after, the soldiers began to open dumpling (gyoza) restaurants around Utsunomiya. After the Utsunomiya city officials started to realize the popularity of gyoza in 1990, the Utsunomiya Gyoza Association was created. The creation of this association only made gyoza's popularity grow in the city. Utsunomiya gyoza is famous country-wide, so it attracts many tourists, as well as brings in a significant amount of revenue into the city.

==== Popularity of Gyoza ====
The city has 30 restaurants that specialize in serving gyoza. Utsunomiya is allegedly the highest consumer city of gyoza in Japan. There is also a 1.5-metre (5 ft) statue in the shape of the gyoza outside of Utsunomiya's JR station.

==== The Gyoza Festival ====
Utsunomiya's annual Gyoza Dumplings Festival occurs at the Castle Ruins Park. Visitors are able to taste different types of gyozas served by various gyoza-making restaurants. Festival attendees can also watch various bands and comedians near the festival grounds.

== Sister cities ==
- Auckland (then Manukau City), New Zealand, sister city since February 24, 1982
- Tulsa, Oklahoma, United States, sister city since July 10, 1992
- Qiqihar, Heilongjiang, China, friendship city since September 30, 1984
- Nuremberg, Bavaria, Germany, friendship city since June 12, 1998
- Orléans, Centre-Val de Loire, France, friendship city since May 7, 1989
- Pietrasanta, Tuscany, Italy, friendship city since August 3, 1995

== Notable people ==
- Kozue Ando, professional football player
- Minori Chihara, voice actress
- Nanae Chrono, manga artist
- Yukio Edano, politician
- Hajime Funada, politician
- Yuria Hime, professional wrestler
- Kanako Itō, singer
- Naoya Kondo, professional football player
- Ai Kurogo, professional volleyball player
- Ikuo Matsumoto, professional football player
- Masako Mori, singer
- Meichi Narasaki, professional rock climber
- Tomoa Narasaki, professional rock climber
- Toshio Nobe, manga artist
- Takuya Nomura, professional wrestler
- Sadao Watanabe, jazz musician
- Naoki Yamamoto, professional racing driver
- Susumu Yanase, politician
- Rui Okubo, kickboxing champion
