= Kamikawachi, Tochigi =

Dissolved municipality in Tochigi prefecture, Japan

Kamikawachi (上河内町, Kamikawachi-machi) was a town located in Kawachi District, Tochigi Prefecture, Japan.

As of 2003, the town had an estimated population of 9,510 and a density of 166.96 persons per km^{2}. The total area was 56.96 km^{2}.

On March 31, 2007, Kamikawachi, along with the town of Kawachi (also from Kawachi District), was merged into the expanded city of Utsunomiya.
