= Kawachi, Tochigi =

Dissolved municipality in Tochigi prefecture, Japan

Coordinates: 36°37′43.3″N 139°56′21.6″E

Kawachi (河内町, Kawachi-machi) was a town located in Kawachi District, Tochigi Prefecture, Japan.

As of 2003, the town had an estimated population of 35,247 and a density of 738.62 persons per km^{2}. The total area was 47.72 km^{2}.

On March 31, 2007, Kawachi, along with the town of Kamikawachi (also from Kawachi District), was merged into the expanded city of Utsunomiya.
