= Kawachi District =

District in Tochigi prefecture, Japan

Kawachi (河内郡, Kawachi-gun) is a district located in Tochigi Prefecture, Japan.

As of 2005, the district has an estimated population of 76,471 and a density of 480.35 persons per km^{2}. The total area is 159.20 km^{2}.

The district has one town.

- Kaminokawa

== Timeline (1960s to present) ==
- April 1, 1966 - The village of Kawachi gained town status.
- April 1, 1971 - The village of Minamikawachi gained town status.
- July 1, 1994 - The village of Kamikawachi gained town status.
- January 10, 2006 - The town of Minamikawachi merged with the towns of Ishibashi and Kokubunji, both from Shimotsuga District to form the city of Shimotsuke.
- March 31, 2007 - The towns of Kamikawachi and Kawachi merged into the city of Utsunomiya.
