= Mount Nantai =

Stratovolcano on the island of Honshu, Japan

- 男体山
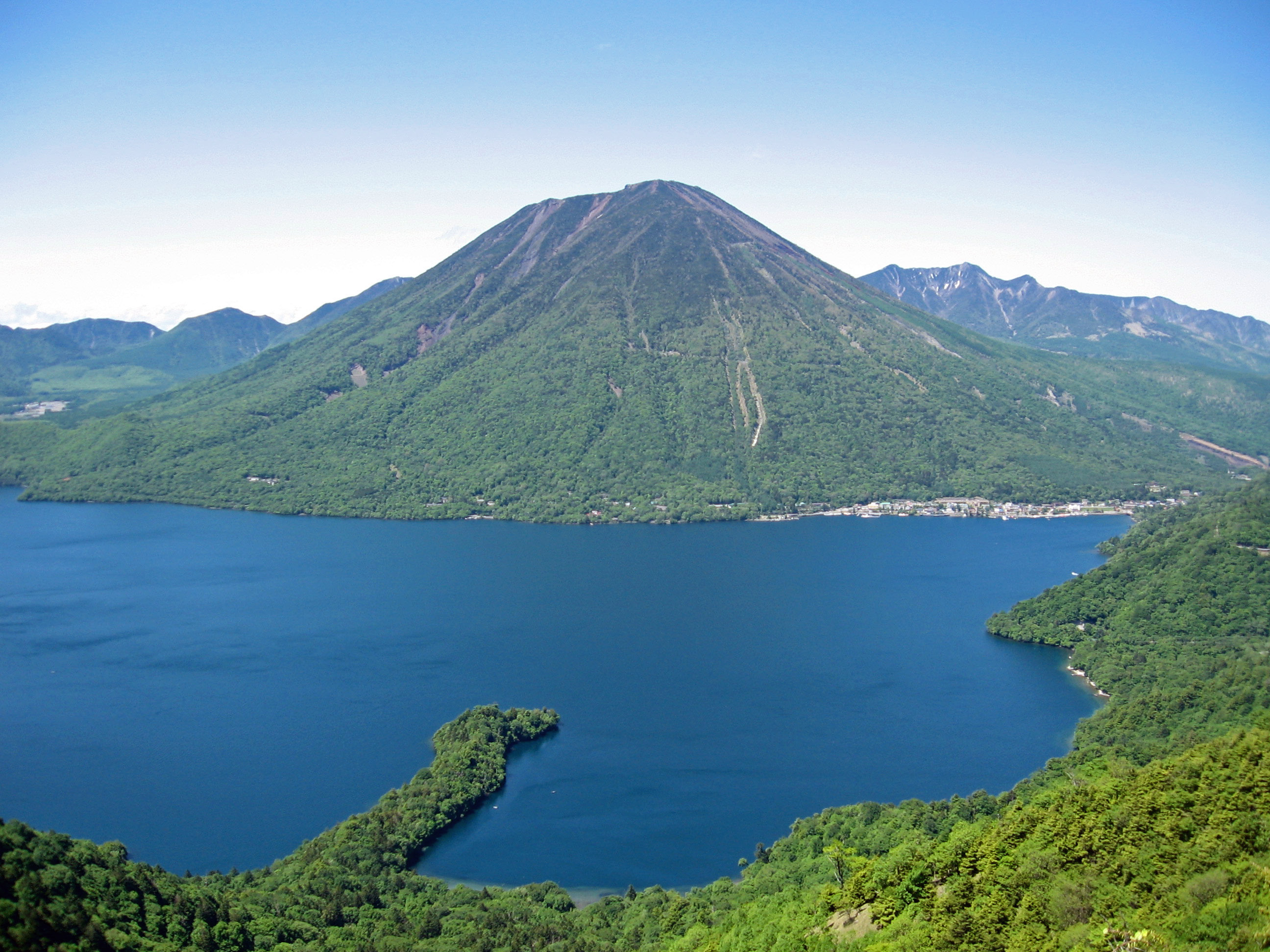
- Mount Nantai and Lake Chūzenji

Highest point
- Elevation: 2,486 m (8,156 ft)
- Listing: List of volcanoes in Japan
- Coordinates: 36°45′43″N 139°29′38″E

Geography
- Location within Japan
- Location: Honshū, Japan

Geology
- Mountain type: Stratovolcano
- Volcanic arc: Northeastern Japan Arc
- Last eruption: 9540 BCE ± 500 years

Mount Nantai (男体山, Nantai-san; lit. 'male-body mountain', also called Mount Futara (二荒山, Futāra-san)) is a stratovolcano in the Nikkō National Park in Tochigi Prefecture, in central Honshū, the main island of Japan. The mountain is 2,486 metres (8,156 ft) high. A prominent landmark, it can be seen on clear days from as far as Saitama, a city 100 km (62 mi) away.

Alongside Mount Nikkō-Shirane, Mount Nantai is one of the newest volcanic edifices in the National Park. Scientific studies of the volcano's geological structure began in 1957 and have established that it was formed roughly 23,000 years ago and that its last eruption was 7000 years ago. The volcano was classified as active by the Japan Meteorological Agency in June 2017.

Since its first known ascent by Buddhist monk Shōdō Shōnin in the 8th century AD, Mount Nantai has become a sacred mountain and a site of pilgrimage in Buddhism and Shinto. As such, it is currently maintained by Futarasan jinja, a Shinto shrine whose go-shintai (御神体) constitutes Mount Nantai. With Tōshō-gū and Rinnō-ji, the site forms the Shrines and Temples of Nikkō, a UNESCO World Heritage Site. Archaeological excavations conducted here from the 19th to 20th centuries have unearthed many artifacts, dating from the end of the Nara period in the 8th century AD to the Edo period from the 17th to 19th centuries. A few of these have been declared Important Cultural Properties by the Japanese Agency for Cultural Affairs.

Mount Nantai is listed among the 100 Famous Japanese Mountains as written by mountaineer and author Kyūya Fukada.

== Toponymy ==
Literally, the two kanji characters that make up the name, 男 and 体, mean "man" and "body" respectively, and so together the combined word 男体 means "male body". Mount Nantai is said to have been the father in a family of mountain deities in Shinto, of which the neighboring Mount Nyohō is the mother and Mount Tarō the eldest son.

== Trekking ==
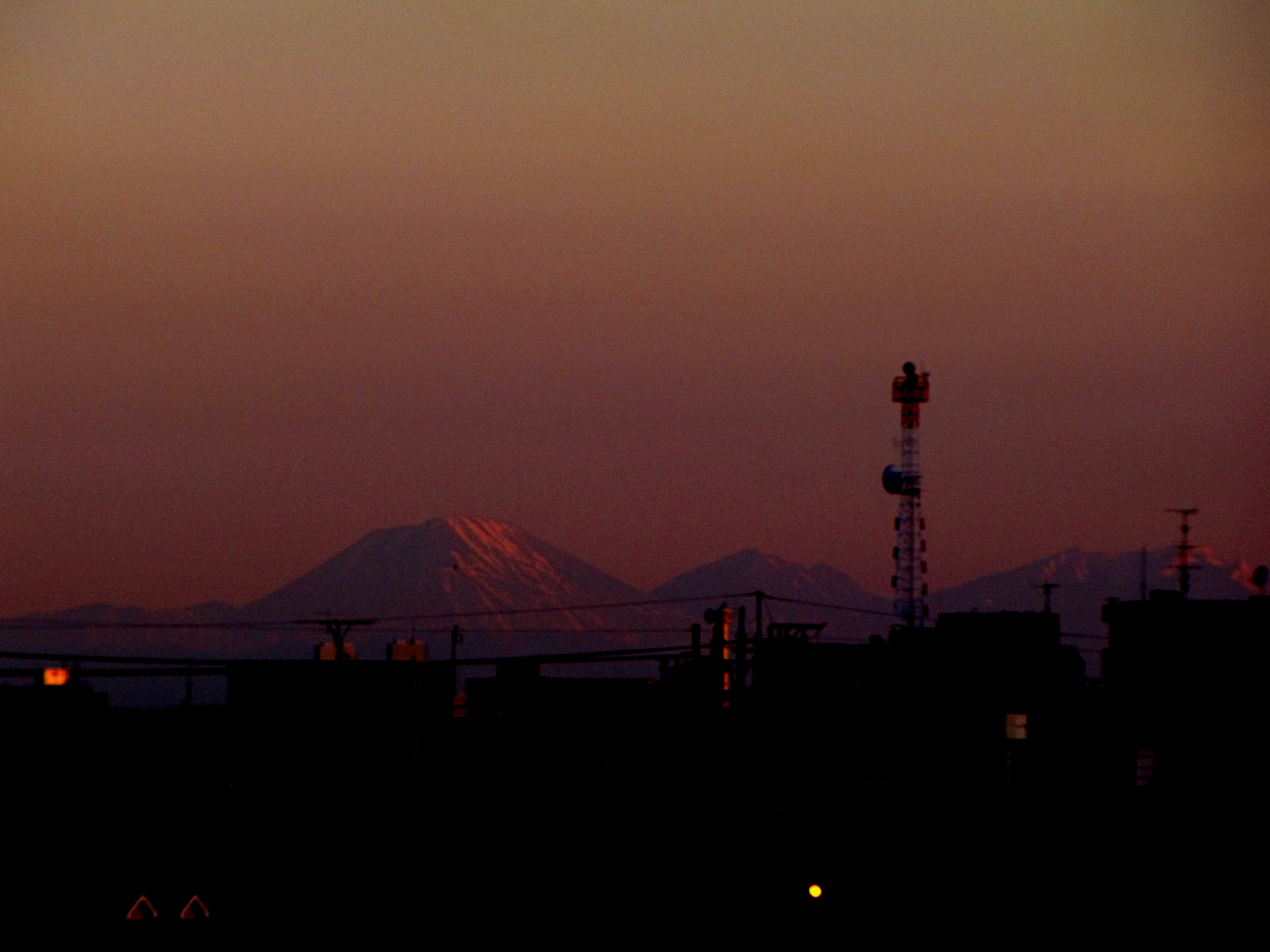
Mount Nantai, as seen from the Japanese city of Saitama.

The mountain is popular with hikers, and the trail to the summit starts through a gate at Futarasan Shrine's Chūgushi (中宮祠, middle shrine). The gate is open between 5 May and 25 October.

Mount Nantai is one of the 100 famous mountains in Japan.

== Volcanic activity ==
In September 2008, the Japan Meteorological Agency was asked to reclassify Mount Nantai as "active" based upon work by Yasuo Ishizaki and colleagues of Toyama University showing evidence of an eruption approximately 7000 years ago.

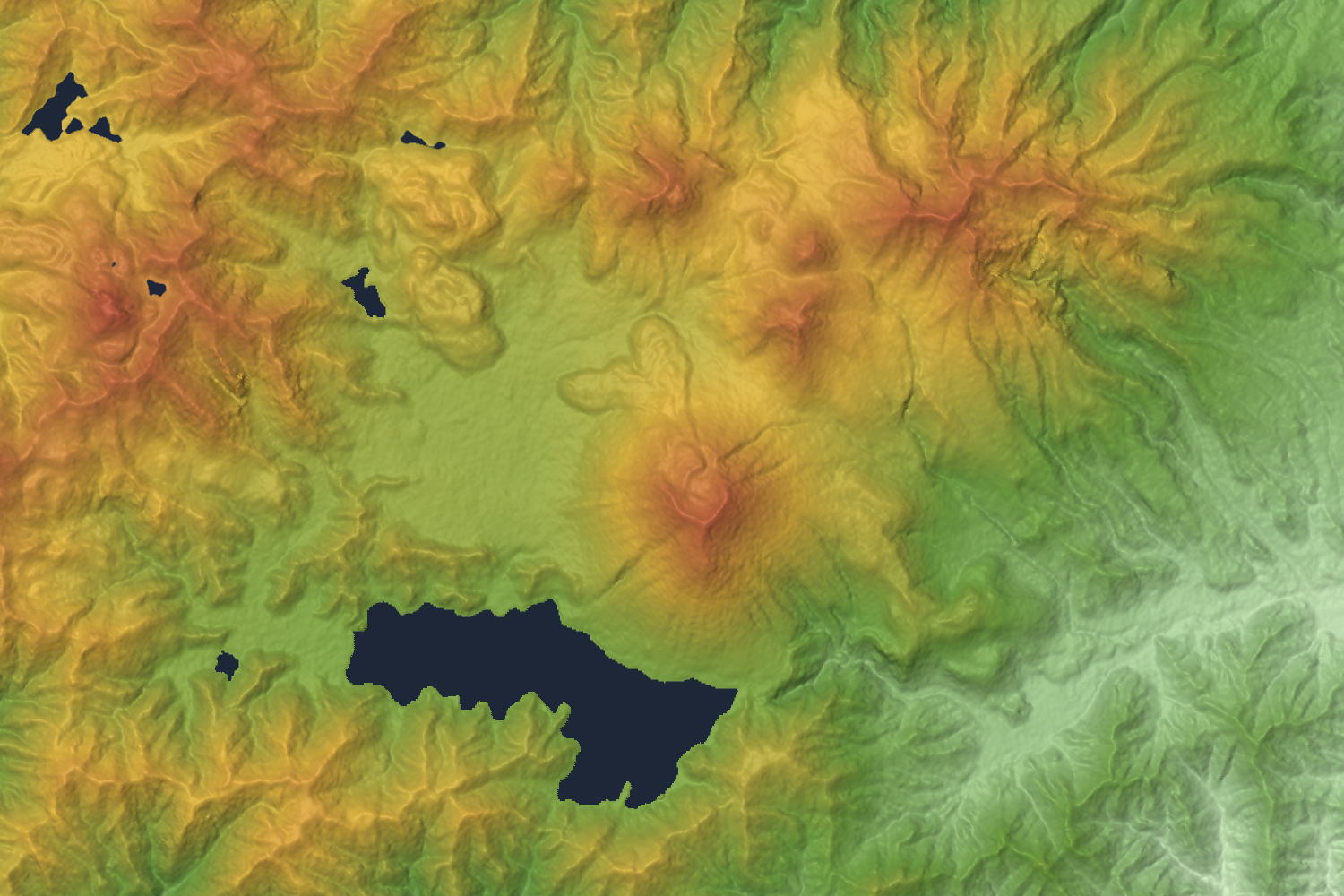
Relief Map

== Mount Nantai as a sacred mountain ==
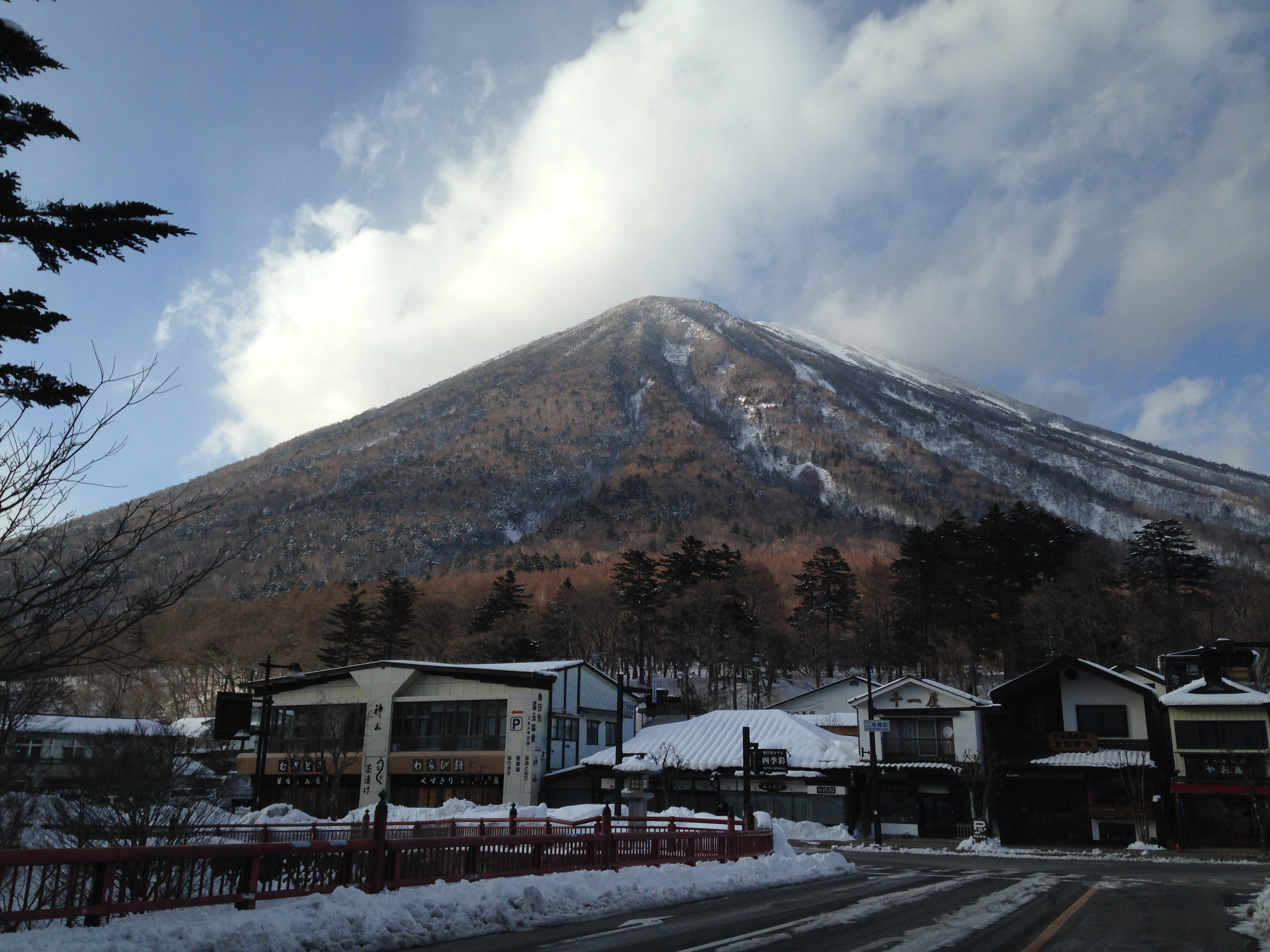
View of Mount Nantai from Futara Bridge

Archaeologists affirm that during the Yayoi period the most common go-shintai (御神体) (a yorishiro housing a kami) in the earliest Shinto shrines was a nearby mountain peak supplying with its streams water, and therefore life, to the plains below where people lived.

Mount Nantai constitutes Futarasan Shrine's go-shintai, and the shrine is an important example of this ancient type of mountain cult. Significantly, the name Nantai (男体) itself means "man's body". The mountain not only provides water to the rice paddies below, but has the shape of the phallic stone rods found in pre-agricultural Jōmon sites.

== See also ==
- List of volcanoes in Japan
- List of mountains in Japan
