= Mount Nyohō =

Mountain in Nikko, Japan

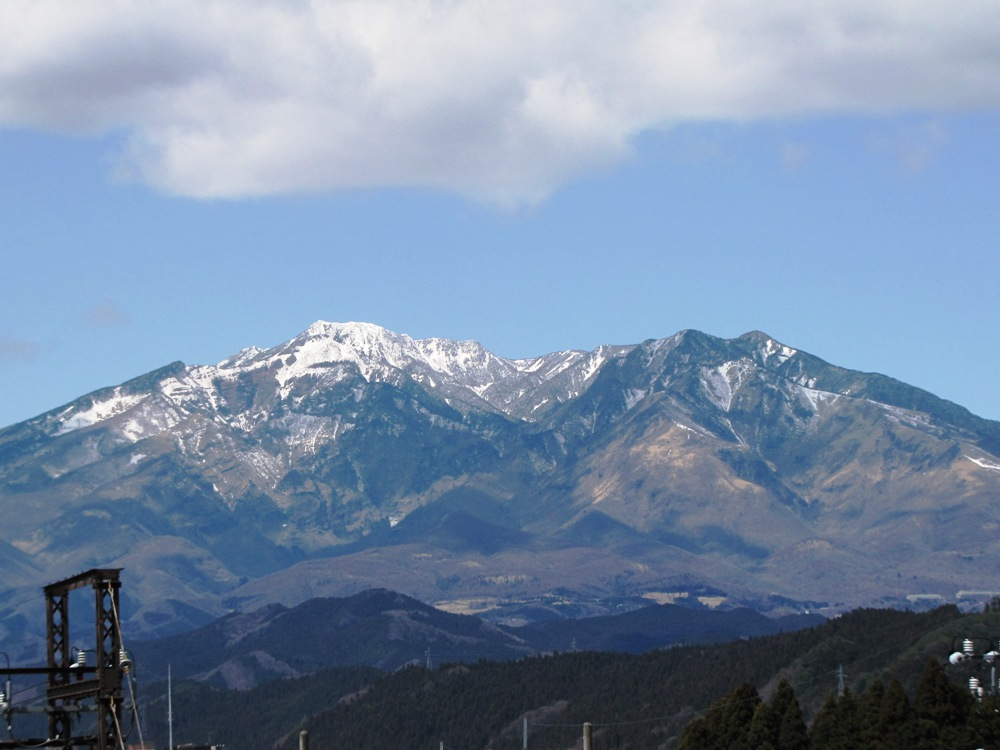
- View of Mount Nyohō from Nikkō.

Highest point
- Elevation: 2,483 m (8,146 ft)
- Listing: Volcanoes of Japan
- Coordinates: 36°48′41.3424″N 139°32′11.3316″E

Naming
- Native name: 女峰山 (Japanese)

Geography
- Location within Japan
- Country: Japan
- Prefecture: Tochigi
- Protected area: Nikkō National Park

Geology
- Last eruption: Late Pleistocene

Mount Nyohō (女峰山, Nyohō-san) is a mountain in Japan located in Nikkō, on the island of Honshū, north of the Tokyo metropolitan area. This 2,483-metre (8,146 ft) stratovolcano is part of the Nikkō Mountains volcanic complex in Nikkō National Park. It emerged from the floor of Japan's volcanic arc about 560,000 years ago, when the formation of the Nikkō Mountains began, and ceased all volcanic activity 86,000 years ago. The Nyohō volcano has been the object of Shinto worship since time immemorial, and in the 7th century, in connection with the nearby Mount Nantai, it also became a sacred mountain of Buddhism by the will of the Buddhist monk Shōdō Shōnin, a mountain ascetic and propagator of the Buddha's teachings in the ancient province of Shimotsuke. The clerics of Futarasan jinja, a World Heritage Site, maintain it as a place of pilgrimage.

The development of Japanese mountain exploration as a sport and leisure activity, initiated in the late nineteenth century by Westerners and continued by the Japanese after World War II, brings large numbers of hikers in all seasons along the hiking trails that stretch along its slopes, and in the river valley that, as an extension of the collapsed slope of its crater, extends to downtown Nikkō.

== Bibliographic sources ==
- (ja) Kohei Hirano et Masaki Takahashi, « 日光男体火山最末期噴出物の斑晶鉱物化学組成とマグマ溜りプロセス » [« Chemical composition of phenocrysts in products of the last eruption of Nikko-Nantai Volcano, central Japan, and its implications for the processes in magma chamber »], Proceedings of the Institute of Natural Sciences, Tokyo, Nihon University, vol. 41, 2006 (ISSN 1343-2745).
- (ja) 日光市史編さん委員会, 日光市史 [« Histoire de Nikkō »], vol. 1, Nikkō, Shimotsuke Shimbun, December 1979, 1st ed., 1101 p. (OCLC 835695408 ).
- (ja) Takahiro Yamamoto, Geological survey of Japan, « 日本の主要第四紀火山の積算マグマ噴出量階段図 : 日光火山群 », on www.gsj.jp, 2014.
- Hayashi, Shushi (1994). "Diffusion of a New Strawberry Variety, Nyoho, in Tochigi Prefecture". Geographical Review of Japan (in Japanese). 67 (9). Tokyo: 619–637. doi:10.4157/grj1984a.67.9_619. ISSN 2185-1735.
- Japan Travel Bureau, Inc., Must-See in Nikko, Tokyo, JTB, coll. « Japan in your Pocket » (no 6), January 1994, 4th ed. (1st ed. 1985), 191 p. (ISBN 4-533-00529-2).
