= Shrines and Temples of Nikkō =

Shrines and Temples of Nikko
UNESCO World Heritage Site
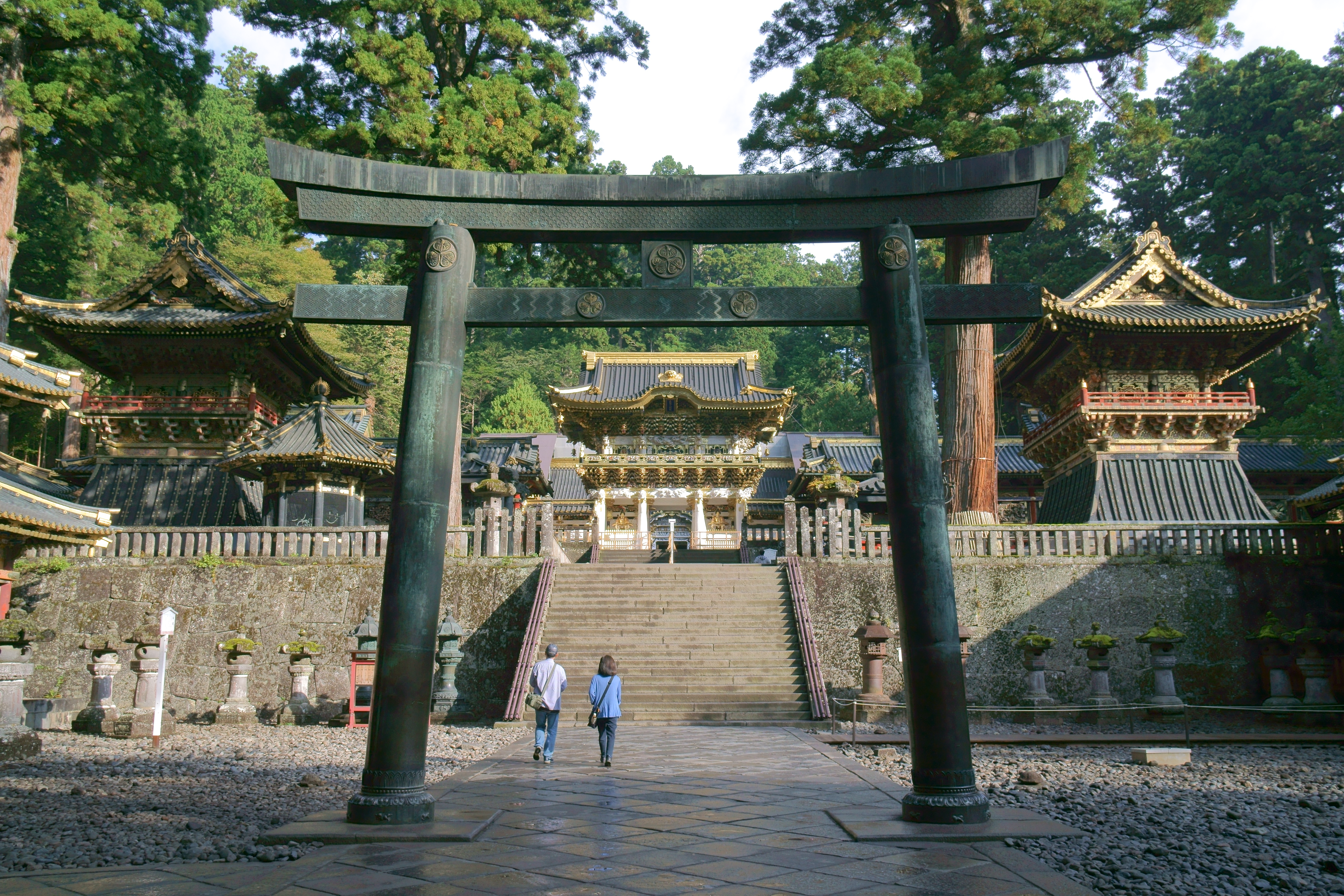
- Interactive map of Shrines and Temples of Nikko
- Location: Nikkō, Tochigi Prefecture, Kantō region, Japan
- Criteria: Cultural: (i), (iv), (vi)
- Reference: 913
- Inscription: 1999 (23rd Session)
- Area: 50.8 ha (126 acres)
- Buffer zone: 373.2 ha (922 acres)
- Coordinates: 36°45′23″N 139°35′58″E

The UNESCO World Heritage Site Shrines and Temples of Nikkō encompasses 103 buildings or structures and the natural setting around them. It is located in Nikkō, Tochigi Prefecture, Japan. The buildings belong to two Shinto shrines (Futarasan Shrine and Tōshō-gū) and one Buddhist temple (Rinnō-ji). Nine of the structures are designated National Treasures of Japan while the remaining 94 are Important Cultural Properties. UNESCO listed the site as World Heritage in 1999.

== Nominated properties ==
=== Futarasan Shrine ===
23 structures of the Futarasan Shrine are included in the nomination. All are registered Important Cultural Properties. They are:

Name	Remarks	Age	Picture
Honden	Main building enshrining the three deities of the Futarasan shrine.	1619	
Karamon	Gate in front of the Honden.	early Edo period	
Wakimon	Gate of the Sukibe.	early Edo period	
Sukibe	Roofed wall enclosing the Honden.	early Edo period	
Haiden	Worship hall.	1645	
Torii	Copper torii marking the entrance to the shrine.	1799	
Shinkyō	Wooden arched bridge.	1904	
Betsugū Taki-no-o-jinja Honden	Building enshrining Tagorihime no Mikoto.	1713	
Betsugū Taki-no-o-jinja Karamon	Gate of the Betsugū Taki-no-o-jinja Honden.	1740	
Betsugū Taki-no-o-jinja Haiden	Worship hall.	c. 1713	
Betsugū Taki-no-o-jinja Rōmon	Gate to the Betsugū Taki-no-o-jinja.	1697	
Betsugū Taki-no-o-jinja Torii (3 structures)	Stone torii at the approach to the Betsugū Taki-no-o-jinja marking the sacred area.	1696, 1779	
Betsugū Hongū-jinja Honden	Building enshrining Ajisukitakahikone no Mikoto.	1685	
Betsugū Hongū-jinja Karamon	Gate in front of the Betsugū Hongū-jinja Honden.	c. 1685	
Betsugū Hongū-jinja Sukibe	Roofed wall enclosing the Betsugū Hongū-jinja Honden.	c. 1685	
Betsugū Hongū-jinja Haiden	Worship hall.	1685	
Betsugū Hongū-jinja Torii	Stone torii at the approach to the Betsugū Hongū-jinja marking the sacred area.	1800	
Shin-yosha	Storehouse for mikoshi, portable shrines.	1641	
Daikokuden	Building enshrining Ōkuninushi no Mikoto.	1745	
Massha Mitomo-jinja Honden	Building enshrining Sukunabikona no Mikoto.	c. 1751–1761	
Massha Hie-jinja Honden	Building enshrining Oyamakui no Mikoto.	c. 1648–1651	

=== Tōshō-gū 東照宮 ===
42 buildings of the Tōshō-gū shrine are included in the nomination. Eight structures are registered National Treasures of Japan and 34 are Important Cultural Properties.

Name	Remarks	Age	Picture
Honden, Ishinoma, Haiden	Honden: Building enshrining the deified image of Tokugawa Ieyasu, Tōshō Daigongen. Ishinoma: Chamber connecting Honden and Haiden. Haiden: Worship hall.	1636	
Shōmen Karamon	Gate in front of Haiden. Third gate.	1636	
Haimen Karamon	Gate behind Honden.	1636	
Tōzai Sukibe	Roofed wall enclosing Honden, Ishinoma and Haiden.	1636	
Yōmeimon	Two-storied gate. Second gate.	1636	
Tōzai Kairō and Kugurimon	Roofed cloisters enclosing shrine buildings.	1636	
Kamishamusho	Building for Shinto services.	1636	
Kaguraden	Building for the Kagura ritual.	early Edo period	
Shin-yosha	Storehouse for mikoshi, portable shrines.	1636	
Shōrō	Belfry	1636	
Korō	Storehouse for drums.	1636	
Honjidō	Building enshrining Yakushi, the healing Buddha.	1636	
Kyōzō	Storehouse for sutras.	1636	
Kamijinko	Storehouse.	early Edo period	
Nakajinko	Storehouse.	early Edo period	
Shimojinko	Storehouse.	early Edo period	
Mizuya	Stone building sheltering the water basin.	1636	
Shinkyū	Stable for sacred horses.	1636	
Omotemon	First gate.	1636	
Gojūnotō	Five-storied pagoda.	1818	
Ishidorii	Stone torii at front approach.	1618	
Sakashitamon	Gate at the entrance to the Okusha.	1636	
Okusha Hōtō	Building enshrining the remains of Tokugawa Ieyasu.	1683	
Okusha Karamon	Gate in front of the Hōtō.	1650	
Okusha Ishitamagaki	Stonewall enclosing the Okusha.	early Edo period	
Okusha Haiden	Worship hall.	1636	
Okusha Dōjinko	Treasure storehouse.	1654	
Okusha Torii	Copper torii at the front approach to the Okusha.	c. 1683	
Okusha Sekisaku	Stone fence along the front approach.	early Edo period	
Kariden Honden, Ainoma, Haiden	Honden: Building enshrining the deified image of Tokugawa Ieyasu, Tōshō Daigongen in case of repair works on the main Honden. Ainoma: Building connecting the Honden and Haiden. Haiden: Worship hall.	1639	
Kariden Karamon	Gate in front of the Kariden Honden.	early Edo period	
Kariden Sukibe	Roofed wall enclosing the Kariden Honden.	early Edo period	
Kariden Wakimon	Gate of the Kariden Sukibe.	early Edo period	
Kariden Torii	Copper torii at the front approach to the Kariden Honden.	early Edo period	
Kariden Shōrō	Belfry.	early Edo period	
Otabisho Honden	Building used in the Togyosai festival.	1685	
Otabisho Haiden	Worship hall used in the Togyosai festival.	c. 1685	
Otabisho Shinsenjo	Building where sacred food is prepared during the Togyosai festival.	c. 1685	
Kyūokusha Karamon	Stone gate of the Kyūokusha. Reconstructed in a new location after destruction in an earthquake.	1641	
Kyūokusha Torii	Torii of the Kyūokusha. Reconstructed in a new location after destruction in an earthquake.	1641	

=== Rinnō-ji ===
38 buildings of Rinnō-ji temple are included in the nomination. One structure, comprising the Honden, Ainoma and Haiden of the Taiyuin Mausoleum, is a registered National Treasure of Japan and 37 are Important Cultural Properties.

Name	Remarks	Age	Picture
Hon-dō (Sanbutsudō)	Buddha hall.	1647	
Sōrintō	Copper sutra repository tower.	1643	
Hombō Omotemon	Front gate of the Hombō.	mid Edo period	
Kaizandō	Founder's hall dedicated to the priest Shōdō.	c. 1720	
Jōgyōdō	Buddha hall enshrining Amida Nyorai.	1649	
Hokkedō	Buddha hall enshrining Shaka Nyorai.	1649	
Jōgyōdō Hokkedō Watarirō	Roofed corridor between Hokkedō and Watarirō.	1649	
Jigendō Byōdō	Building enshrining the remains of the priest Tenkai.	early Edo period	
Jigendō Haiden	Building for worshipping Jigendō.	1649	
Jigendō Kyōzō	Storehouse for documents collected by the priest Tenkai.	early Edo period	
Jigendō Shōrō	Belfry.	early Edo period	
Jigendō Amidadō	Buddha hall enshrining Amida Nyorai.	early Edo period	
Kodamadō	Buddha hall enshrining Kodama.	early Edo period	
Gohōtendō	Buddha hall enshrining Bishamonten, Benzaiten and Daikokuten.	c. 1615–1623	
Kannondō	Buddha hall enshrining Kanzeon Bosatsu (Avalokiteśvara Kṣitigarbha).	1685	
Sanjūnotō	Three-storied pagoda.	1685	
Taiyuin Mausoleum (Taiyū-in Reibyō): Honden, Ainoma and Haiden	Honden: Building enshrining Taiyū-in, the deified image of Tokugawa Iemitsu. Ainoma: Chamber connecting the Honden and Haiden. Haiden: Worship hall.	1653	
Taiyū-in Reibyō Karamon	Gate in front of the Taiyū-in Reibyō.	1653	
Taiyū-in Reibyō Mizugaki	Roofed wall enclosing the Taiyū-in Reibyō Honden and other structures.	1653	
Taiyū-in Reibyō Wakamon	Gate of the Taiyū-in Reibyō Mizugaki.	1653	
Taiyū-in Reibyō Gokūsho	Building used for preparing sacred food.	1653	
Taiyū-in Reibyō Gokūsho Watarirō	Roofed corridor between the Honden and Gokūsho.	1653	
Taiyū-in Reibyō Yashamon	Third gate.	1653	
Taiyū-in Reibyō Yashamon Sayū Kairō	Roofed corridors on both sides of the Yashamon.	1653	
Taiyū-in Reibyō Shōrō	Belfry.	1653	
Taiyū-in Reibyō Korō	Storehouse for drums.	1653	
Taiyū-in Reibyō Nitemmon	Second gate.	1653	
Taiyū-in Reibyō Saijō	Lavatory for ritual use.	1653	
Taiyū-in Reibyō Mizuya	Stone column building sheltering the water basin.	1653	
Taiyū-in Reibyō Hōko	Storehouse.	1653	
Taiyū-in Reibyō Niōmon	First gate.	1653	
Taiyū-in Reibyō Kōkamon	Gate at the entrance to the Taiyū-in Reibyō Oku-in.	1653	
Taiyū-in Reibyō Dōzutsumi Hōzō	Copper-plated storehouse.	1653	
Taiyū-in Reibyō Oku-in Hōtō	Building enshrining the remains of Tokugawa Iemitsu.	1653	
Taiyū-in Reibyō Oku-in Inukimon	Copper gate in front of the Hōtō.	1653	
Taiyū-in Reibyō Oku-in Haiden	Worship hall	1653	
Taiyū-in Reibyō Bettōsho Ryūkō-in	Management building for Taiyū-in.	mid Edo period	

=== Cultural Landscape ===
Included in the nomination are the forested mountain slopes on which the buildings are located. The dominating cedar forest was planted in the early 17th century during the construction of the Tōshō-gū. The area where buildings are located is designated as Historic Site. Other parts of the Cultural Landscape are protected within the Nikkō National Park.

== See also ==
- Tourism in Japan
- List of World Heritage Sites in Japan
