= Shōyō-en =

Japanese garden

Coordinates: 36°45′14.60″N 139°36′01.40″E

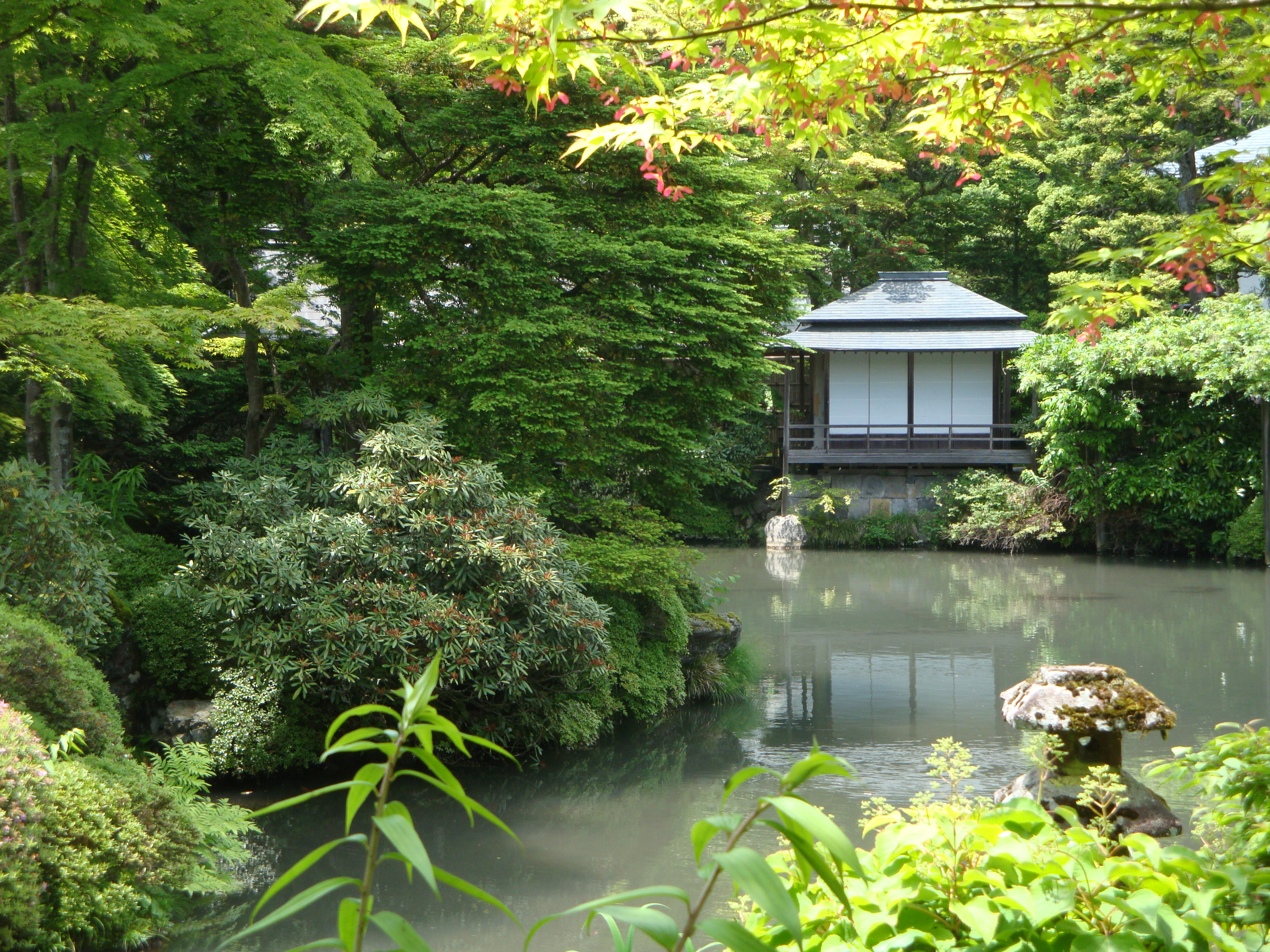
A tea house in Shōyō-en Garden

Shōyō-en (逍遥園) is a Japanese garden located next to the Sanbutsudō Hall of Rinnō-ji Temple in Nikkō. It was constructed in early Edo period, but reformed in the beginning of 19th century. The garden was given its name by a Confucian scholar Issai Sato. There is a pond containing carp in the middle; stone lanterns, bridges, bamboo fences, a pagoda, and a small tea house adorn the garden.

Shōyō-en Garden was designed to look like Lake Biwa and the surrounding scenery in Shiga Prefecture known as the "Eight Views of Omi".

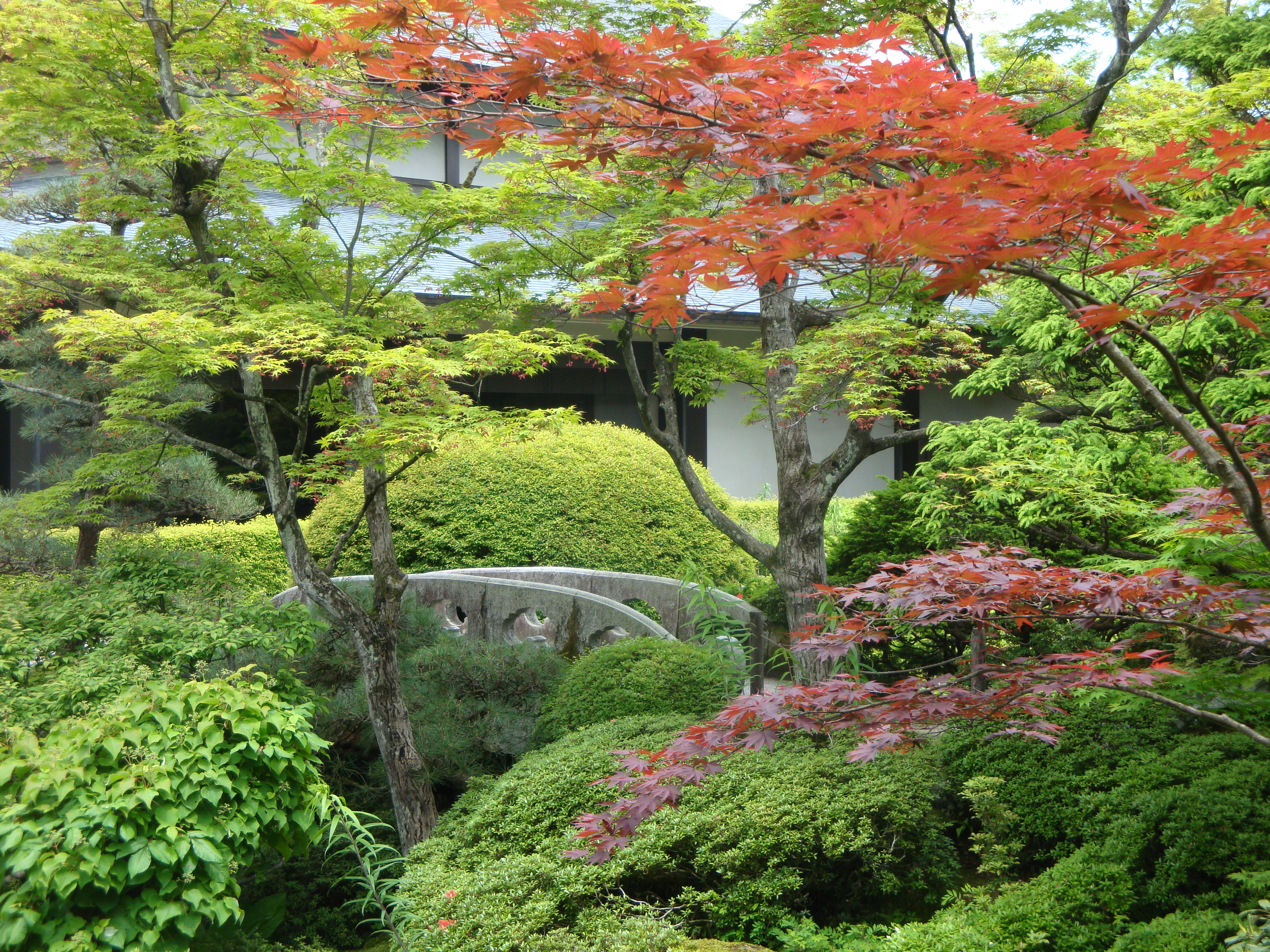
A stone bridge

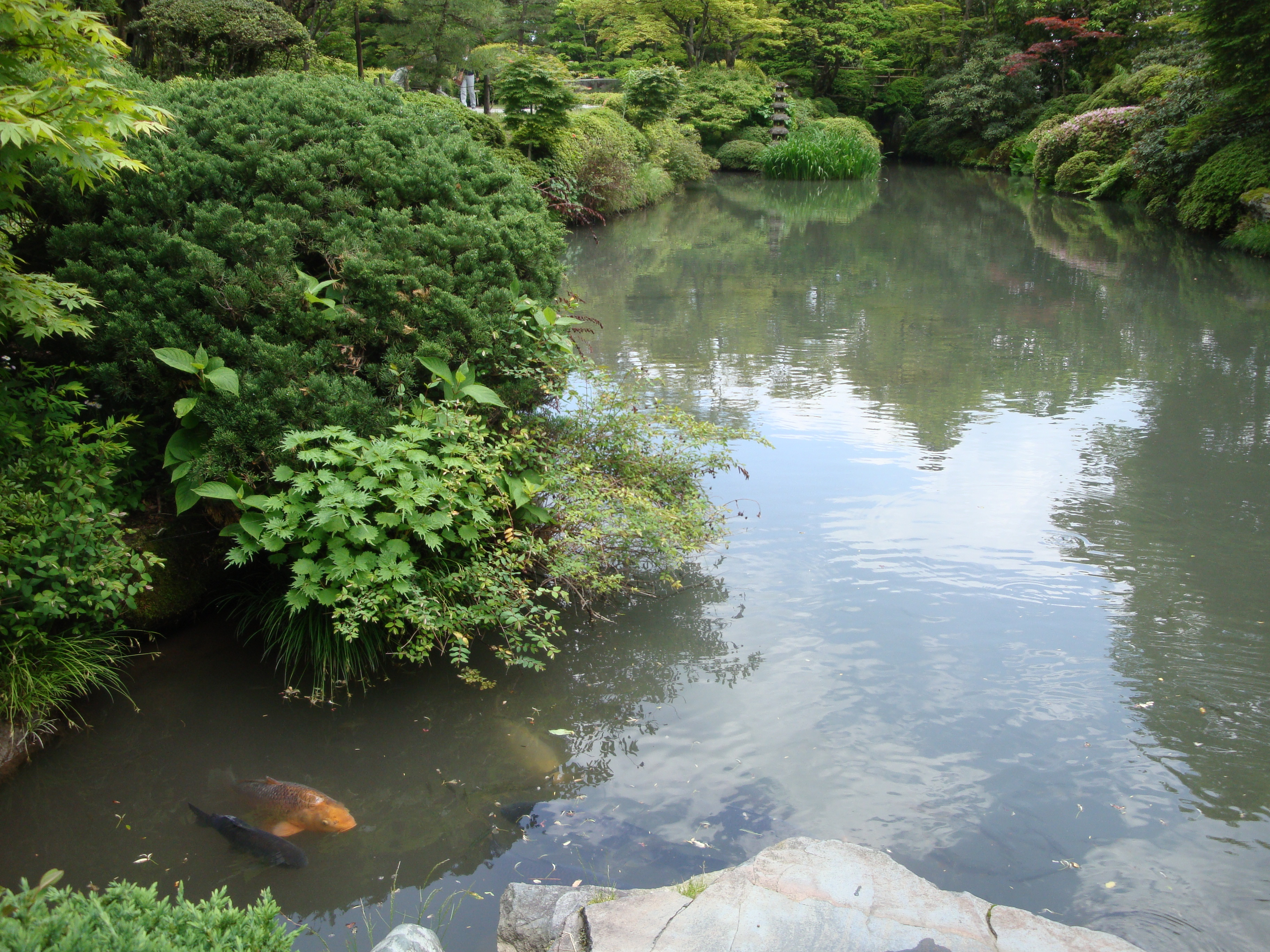
A pond with carp

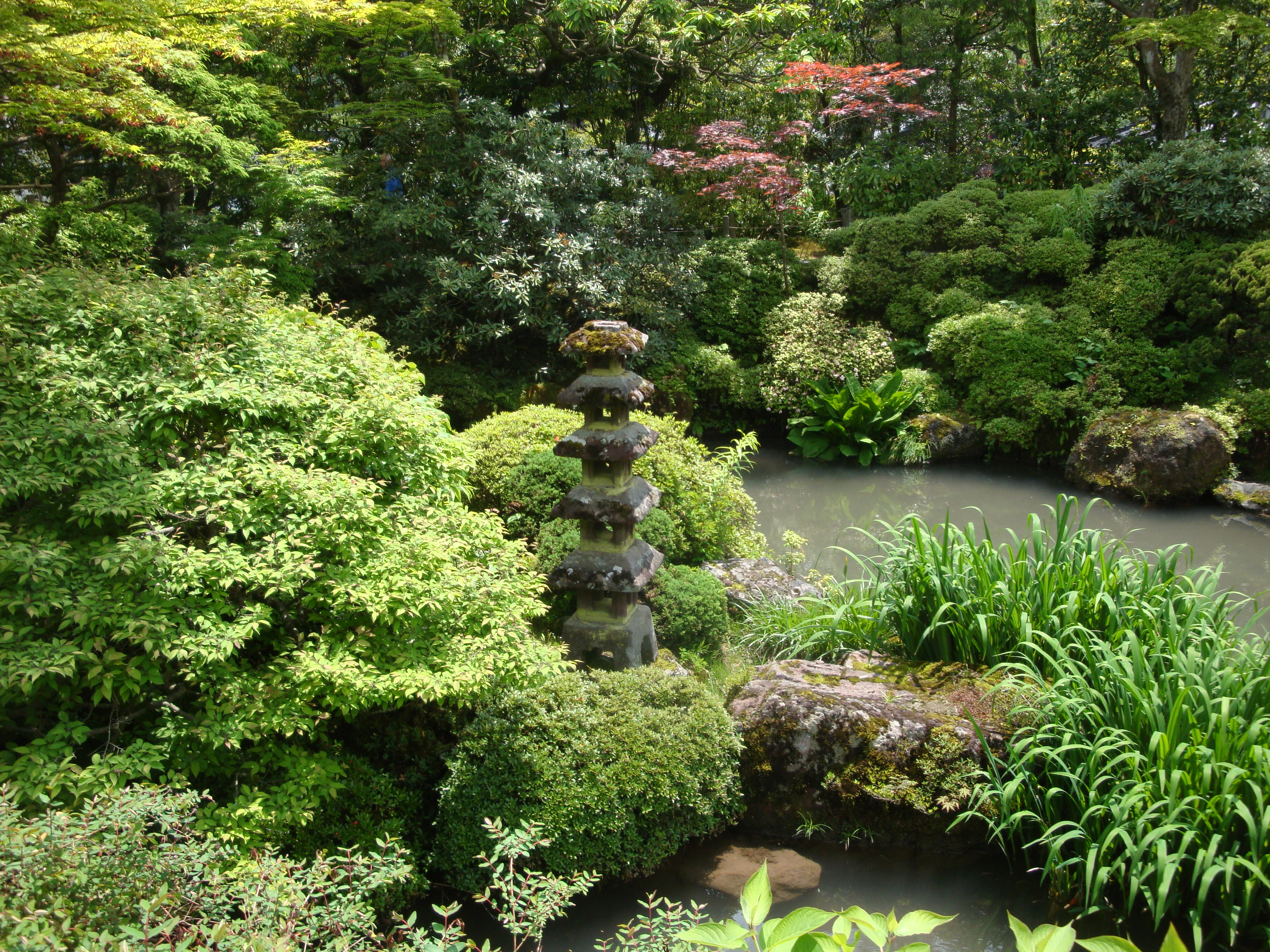
A stone pagoda

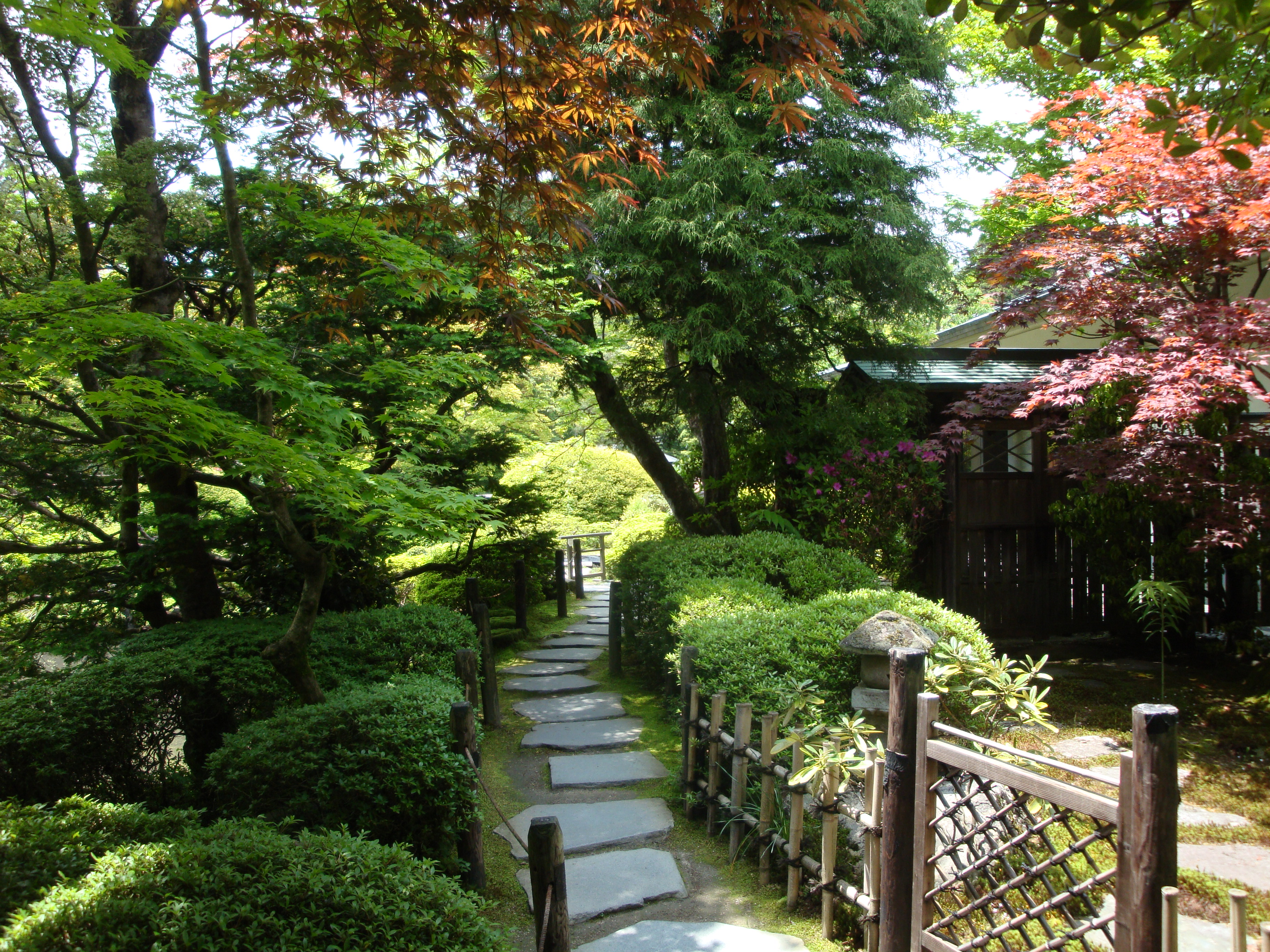
A pathway

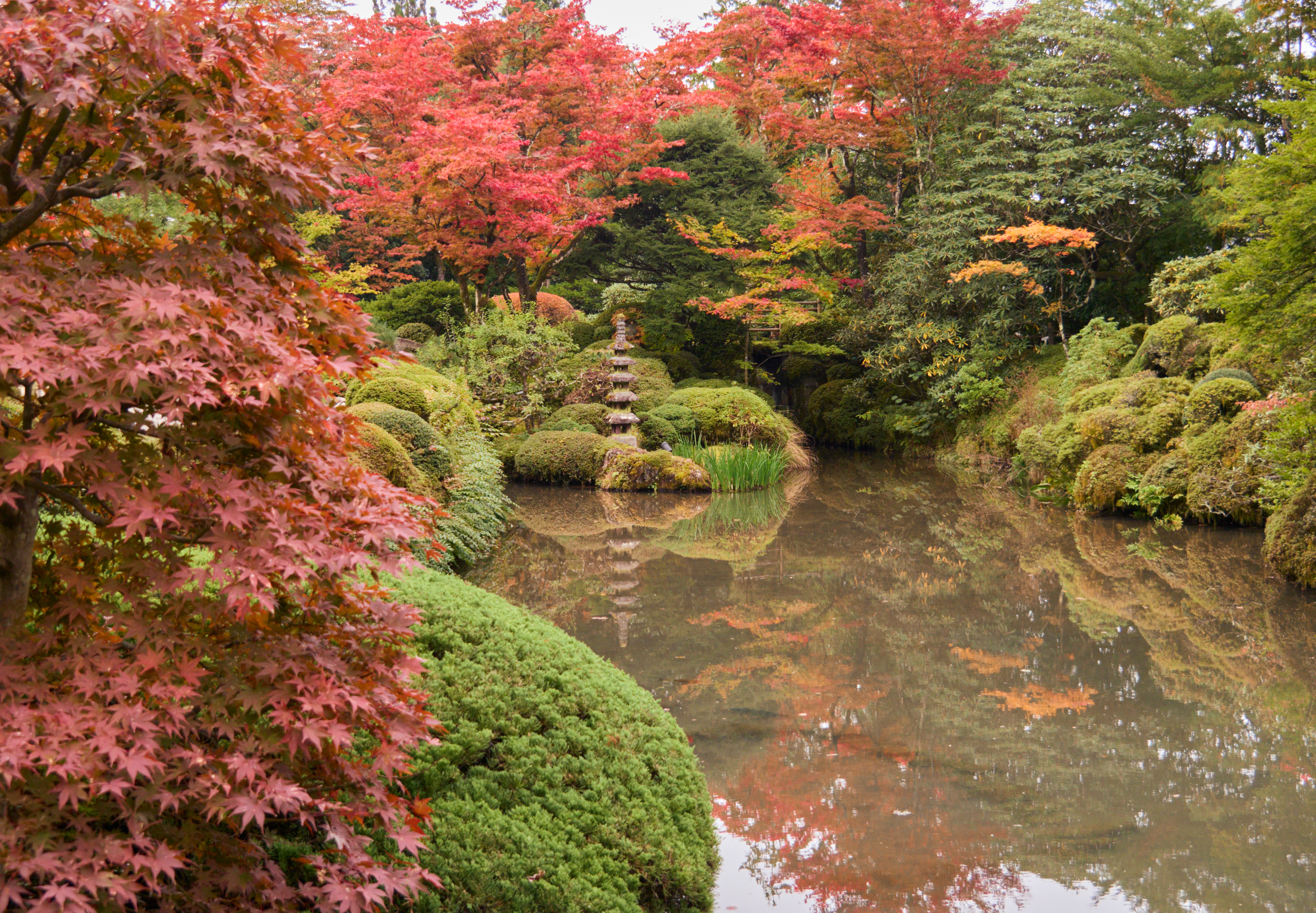
In autumn

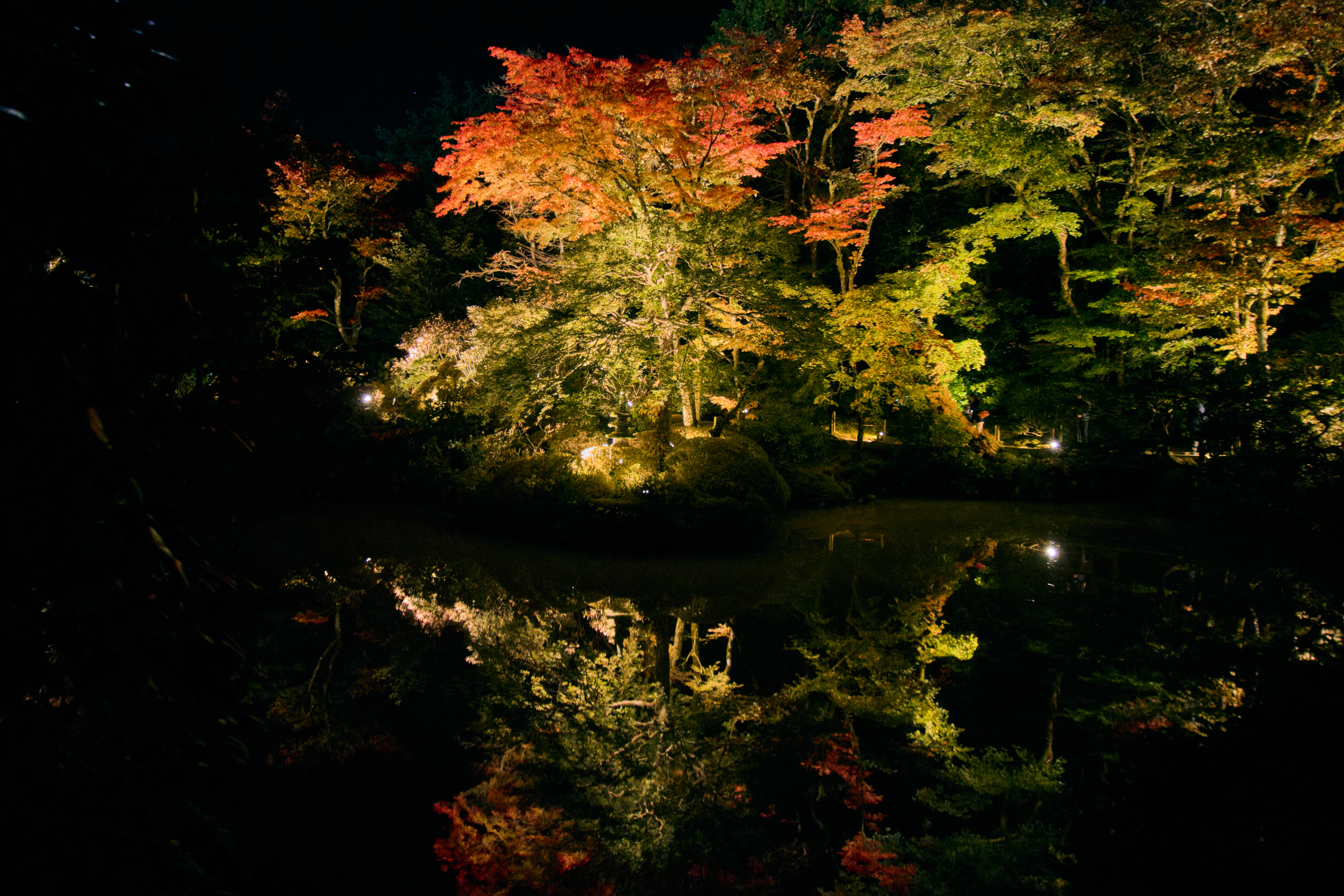
Autumn illuminations
