= Utsunomiya Futarayama Shrine =

Shinto shrine in Utsunomiya, Tochigi, Japan

Utsunomiya Futaarasan Jinja 宇都宮二荒山神社
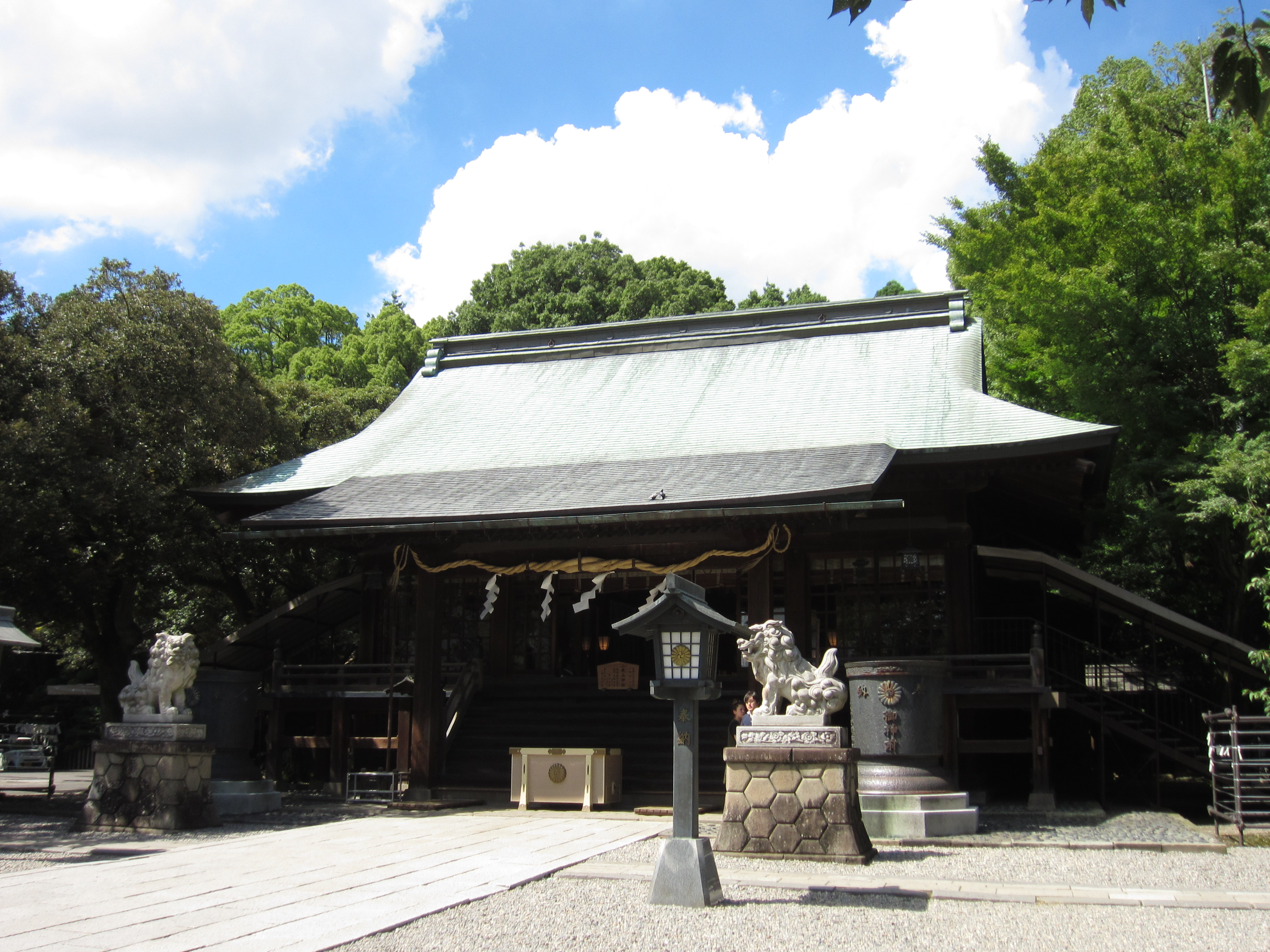
- Haiden of Utsunomiya Futarasan Jinja

- Location within Tochigi Prefecture Location within Japan

Religion
- Affiliation: Shinto
- Deity: Toyokiirihiko no Mikoto
- Festival: October 21

Location
- Location: 1-1-1, Babadori, Utsunomiya-shi, Tochigi-ken
- Interactive map of Utsunomiya Futaarasan Jinja 宇都宮二荒山神社
- Coordinates: 36°33′45″N 139°53′9″E

Architecture
- Style: Shinmei-zukuri
- Founder: Emperor Nintoku
- Established: c.Kofun period

Website
- Official website

Utsunomiya Futarayama Jinja (宇都宮二荒山神社) is a Shinto shrine located in the city of Utsunomiya, Tochigi Prefecture, Japan. Along with the Futarasan Shrine in Nikkō, it is one of the two shrines claiming the title of ichinomiya of former Shimotsuke Province. The shrine's main festival is held annually on October 21. It is located on the summit of Mt. Myōjin (Usugamine; elevation, 135 meters) in the center of Utsunomiya city.

== Enshrined kami ==
- Toyokiirihiko-no-mikoto (豊城入彦命), eldest son of the semi-legendary Emperor Sujin
- Ōmononushi (大物主命), god of nation-building, agriculture, business, medicine, brewing, and seafaring
- Kotoshironushi (事代主命), son of Ōmononushi, one of the eight deities charged with protecting the Imperial Court

== History ==
According to the shrine's legend, when Emperor Nintoku divided the ancient province of Keno at the Kinugawa River into Kamitsukeno (上毛野) and Shimotsukeno (下毛野) (later Kōzuke and Shimotsuke) in the 5th century, he appointed Narawake-no-kimi as the kuni no miyatsuko of Shimotsukeno. This Narawake-no-kimi built a shrine to honor his great-grandfather Prince Toyokiirihiko as ujigami of the region. Per the Nihon Shoki, Prince Toyokiirihiko had been dispatched by his father Emperor Sujin to rule over Keno in response to a dream in which he had climbed Mount Miwa and swung a spear and a sword to the east. When he travelled to his new territory, he brought with him a bunrei of the kami Ōmononushi from Ōmiwa Shrine. The original location of the shrine was a place called Araozaki on the south side across the main street from the current location, but in 838 the shrine was relocated to the current location at Usugamine (Mt. Myōjin). There are many shrines called "Futarasan Shrine", mainly in the Kantō region, but only this shrine, and the one in Nikkō have an ancient origin and are listed in the early Heian period Engishiki. As Prince Toyokiirihiko excelled in the martial arts, the shrine was patronized by famous military commanders throughout its history. Fujiwara Hidesato was able to defeat Taira no Masakado in the Jōhei-Tengyō Rebellion using a magic sword received from this shrine. Per the Heike Monogatari, Nasu no Yoichi prayed to the shrine during the Battle of Yashima. Minamoto no Yoriyoshi, Minamoto no Yoshiie, Minamoto no Yoritomo, and Tokugawa Ieyasu prayed for victory and made various donations and renovations of the shrine.

The place name of "Utsunomiya" is derived from the name of this shrine, and the Utsunomiya clan, a cadet branch of the Fujiwara clan who ruled his area for some five centuries from the end of the Heian period, were originally kannushi of the Futarasan Shrine.

Under State Shinto of the early Meiji period, the shrine received the designation of National shrine, 2nd rank (国幣中社, kokuhei-chūsha) under the Modern system of ranked Shinto shrines in 1871. It was demoted to a prefectural shrine in 1873, but its rank was restored in 1883.

The shrine was once rebuilt every 20 years. In addition, the shrine burned down on several occasions, notably during the invasion of Utsunomiya by the Late Hōjō clan in 1585, during the fires in Utsunomiya in 1773 and 1832, and during the Battle of Utsunomiya Castle in 1868 during the Boshin War. The current shrine was rebuilt as a temporary shrine by the new Meiji government in 1877.

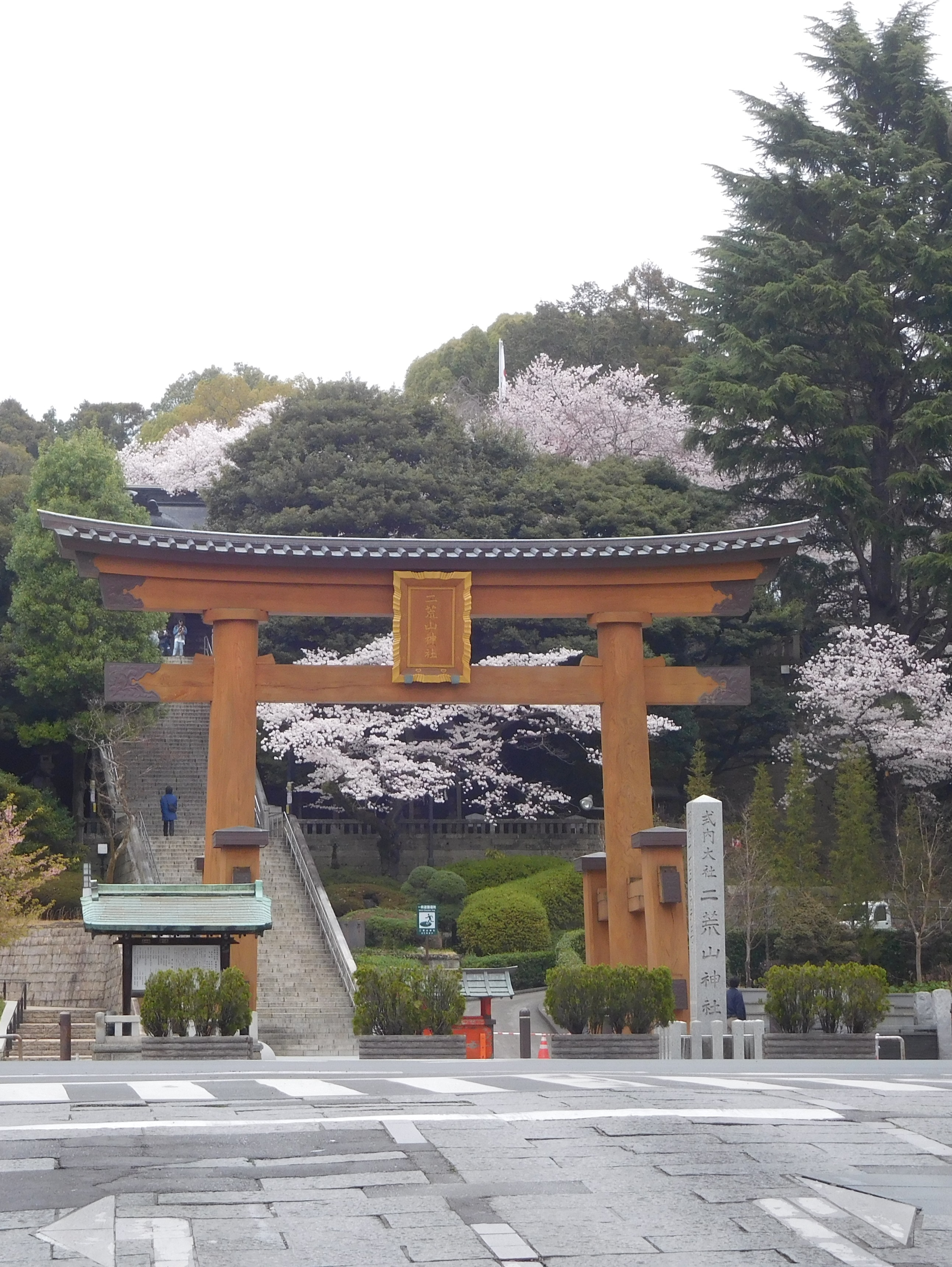
Torii

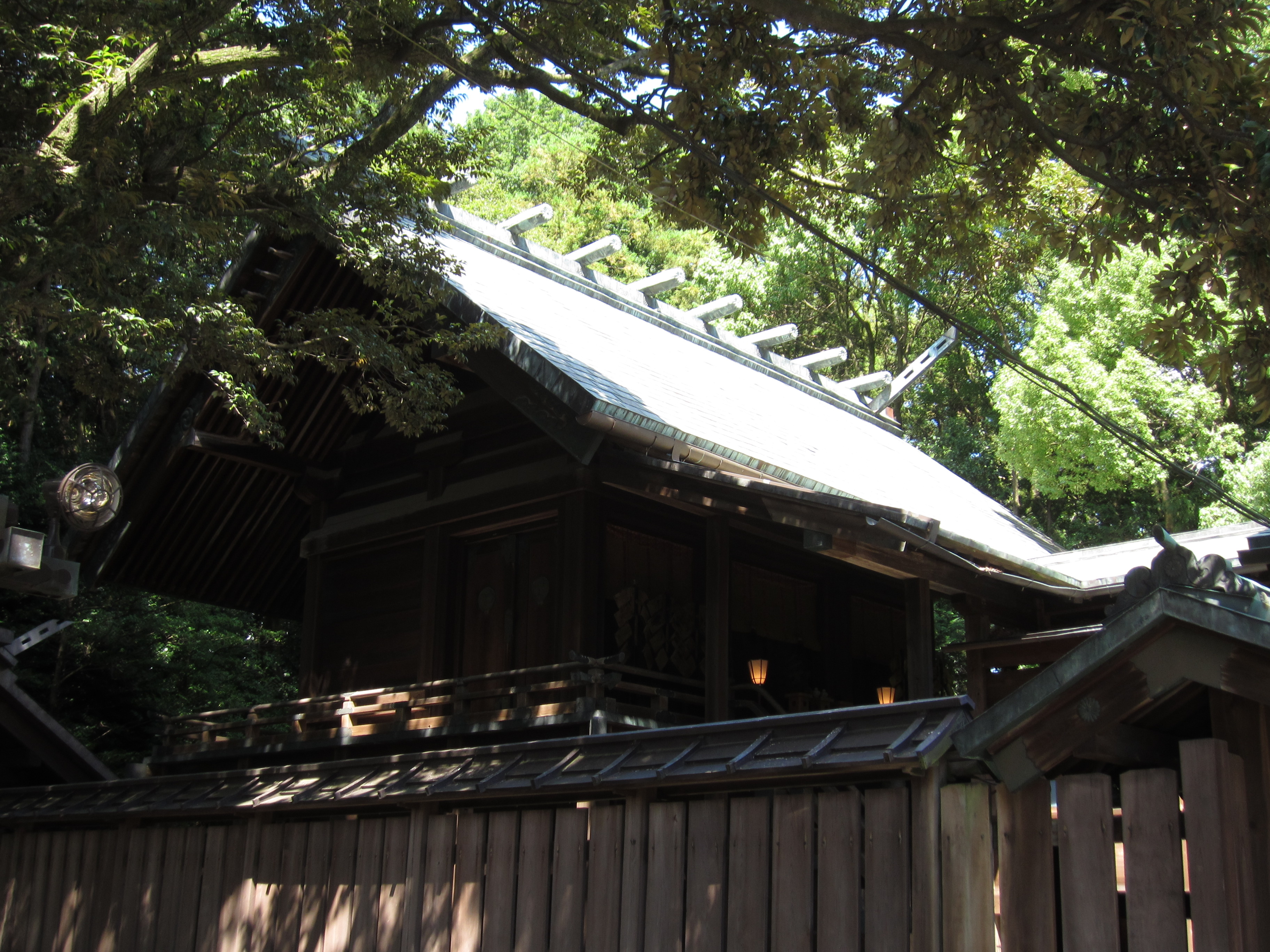
Honden

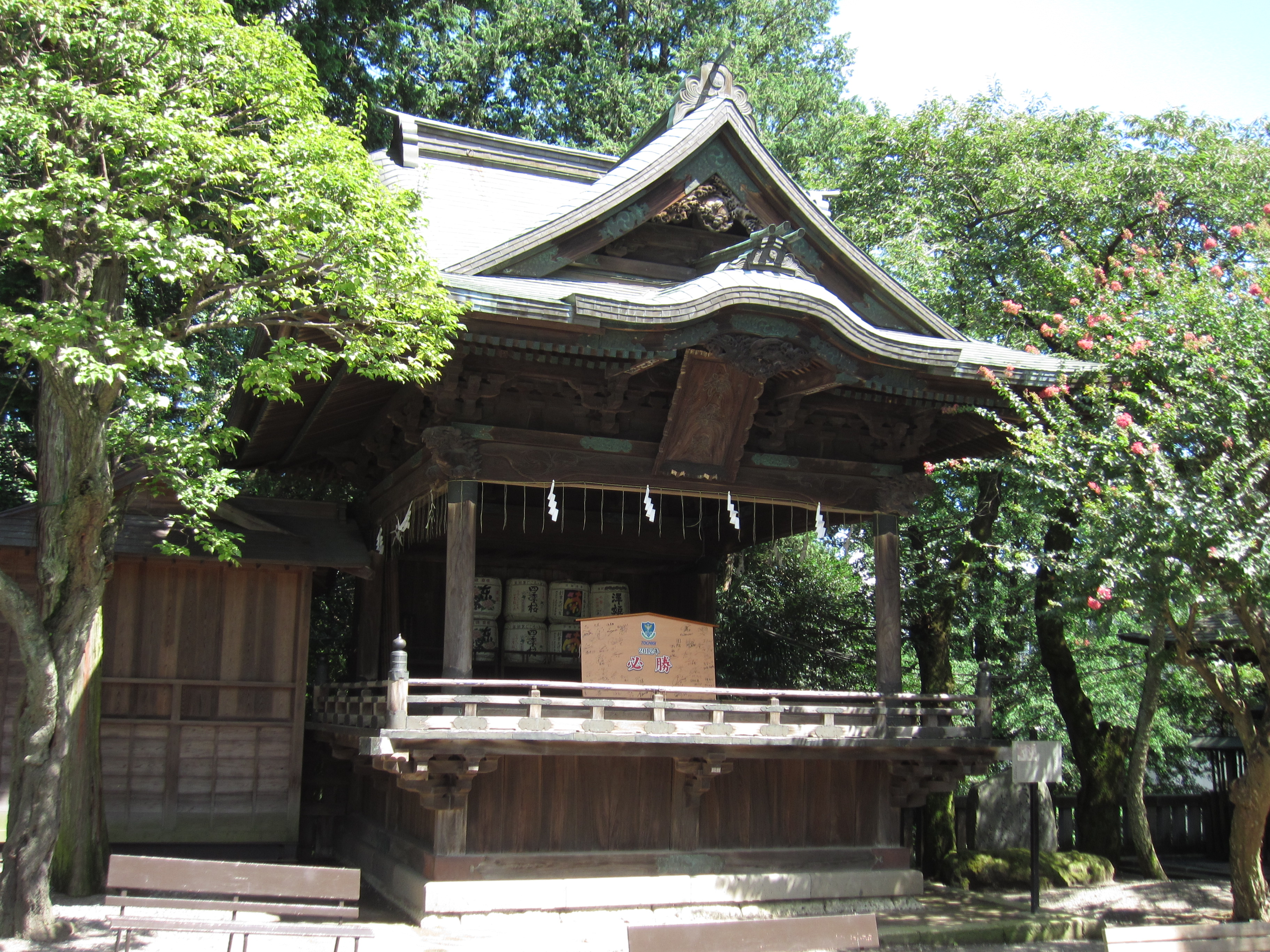
'Kagura stage

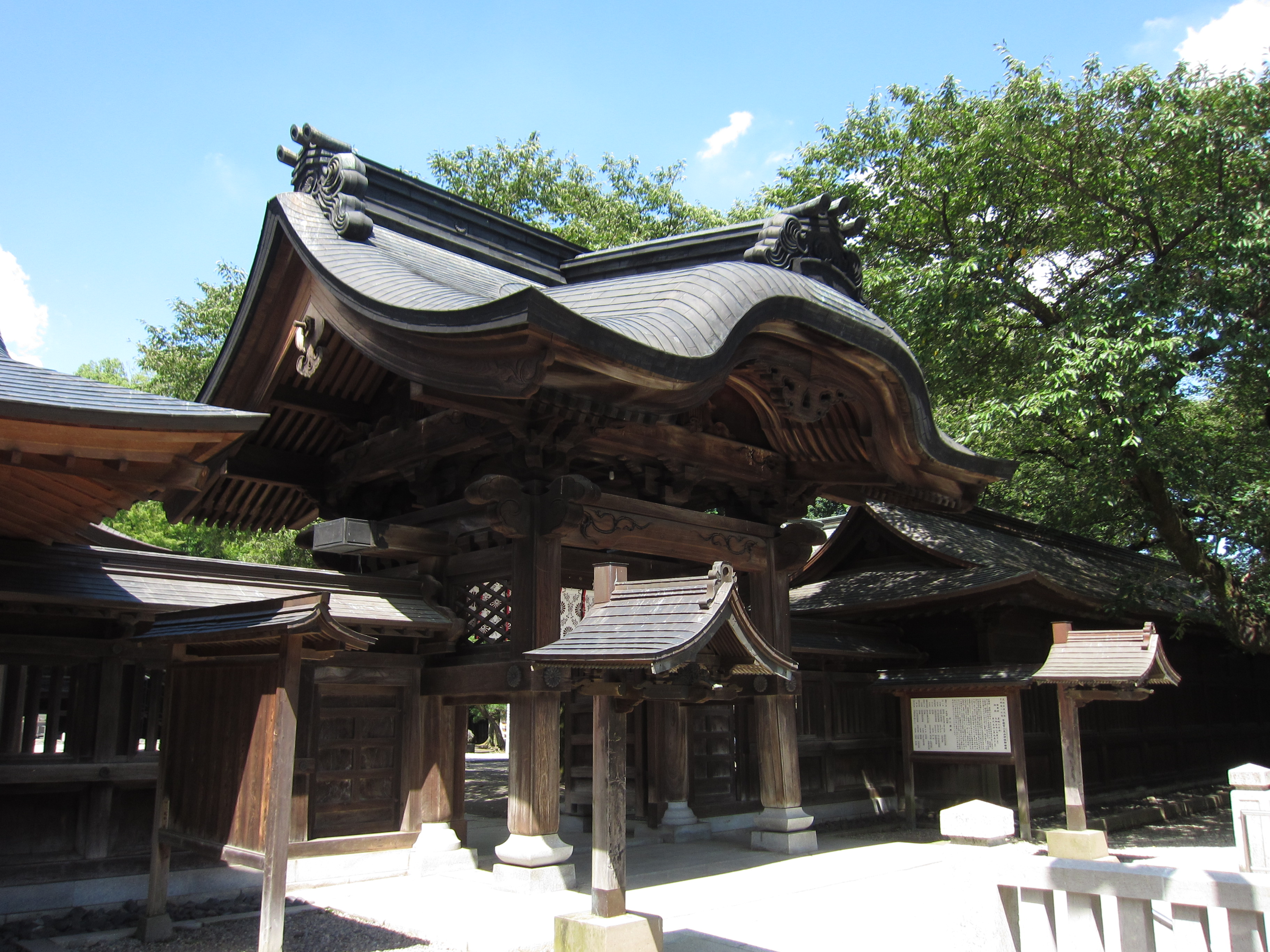
Gate

The shrine is a ten-minute walk from Tōbu-Utsunomiya Station on the Tobu Utsunomiya Line.

== Cultural Properties ==
=== Important Cultural Properties ===
- Thirty-eight section Star Kabuto (三十八間星兜; Sanju-hachi ken Hoshi Kabuto), Nanboku-chō period, made by joining 38 sections of iron base plates and hitting studs from the back, in the shape of a star.
- Komainu (鉄製狛犬; Tetsu-sei Komainu), Kamakura period, made of cast iron.

== See also ==
- List of Shinto shrines
- Ichinomiya
