= Futarasan shrine =

Shinto shrine in the city of Nikkō, Tochigi Prefecture, Japan

Futarasan jinja 二荒山神社
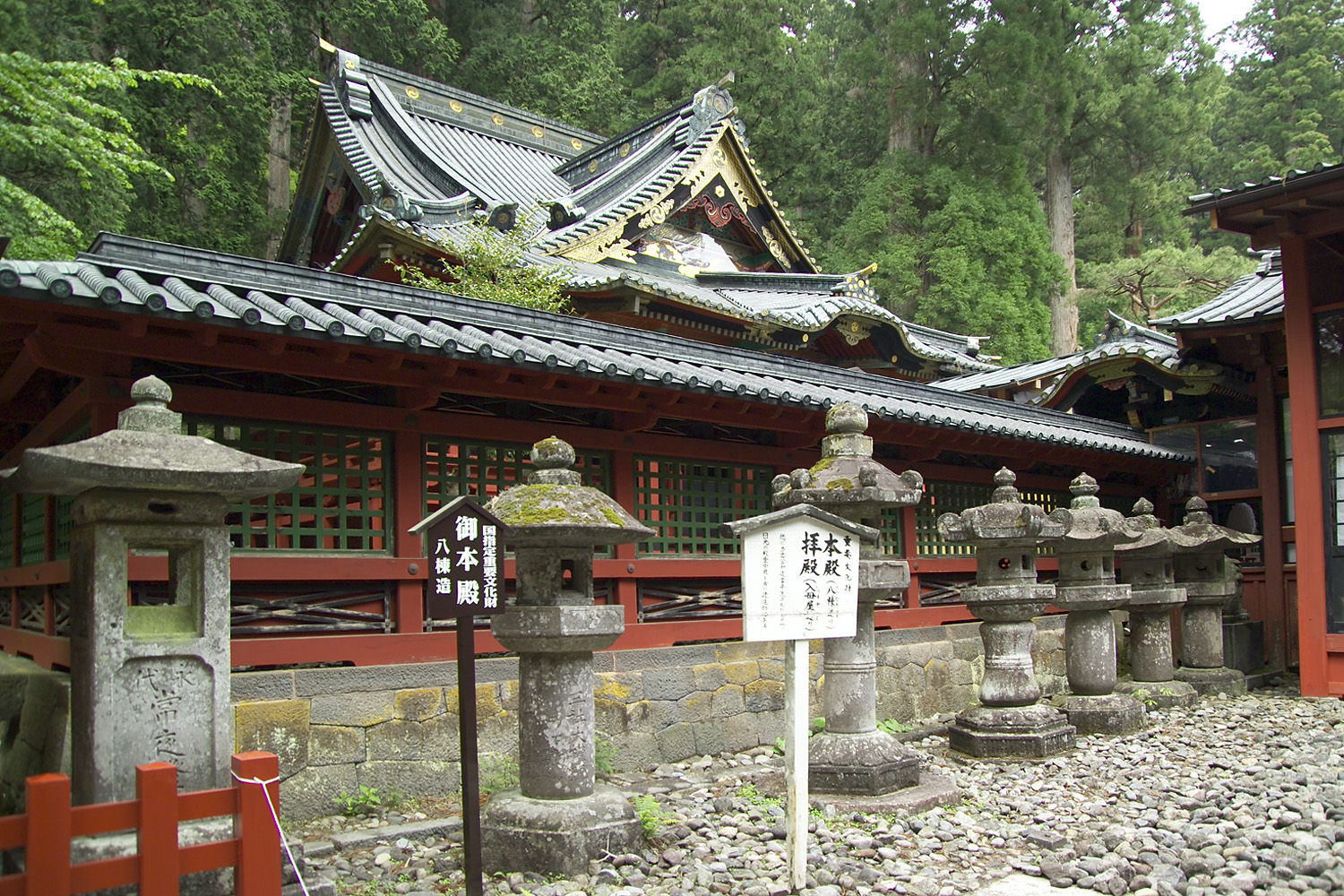
- The honden (main hall) lies within the enclosure.

- Location within Tochigi Prefecture Location within Japan

Religion
- Affiliation: Shinto
- Deity: Ōkuninushi; Tagorihime; Ajisukitakahikone
- Festival: April 13–17

Location
- Location: Nikkō, Tochigi
- Coordinates: 36°45′30″N 139°35′47″E

Architecture
- Founder: Shōdō Shōnin
- Established: 767
- UNESCO World Heritage Site
- Type: Cultural
- Criteria: i, iv, vi
- Designated: 1999
- Reference no.: 913
- National Treasure of Japan

Website
- Official website

Futarasan jinja (二荒山神社) is a Shinto shrine in the city of Nikkō, Tochigi Prefecture, Japan. It is also known as Nikkō Futarasan Shrine, to distinguish it from the Utsunomiya Futarayama Jinja, which shares the same kanji in its name. Both shrines claim the title of ichinomiya of the former Shimotsuke Province. The main festival of the shrine is held annually from April 13 to April 17.

The shrine consists of three geographically separate sections. The main shrine is located between Nikkō Tōshō-gū and the Taiyū-in Mausoleum. Many visitors go to all three, as well as to Rinnō-ji, which are part of the Shrines and Temples of Nikkō UNESCO World Heritage Site. The "middle shrine" is located off the shore of Lake Chuzenji. The "inner shrine" is located at the summit of Mount Nantai, the volcano overlooking the lake.

The shrine possesses two swords that are National treasures of Japan. Dozens of buildings and cultural artifacts are listed as National Important Cultural Properties. The precincts have been designated a National Historic Site.

== Enshrined kami ==
The kami enshrined at Nikkō Futarasan Jinja are:

- Ōkuninushi-no-Mikoto (玉祖命), god of nation-building, agriculture, medicine, and protective magic
- Tagorihime no Mikoto (田心姫命), one of the three Munakata goddesses
- Ajisukitakahikone (味耜高彦根命), god of agriculture and thunder

== Overview ==
The precincts of the shrine include eight peaks of the Nikkō Mountains (Mt. Nantai, Mt. Nyōhō, Mt. Tarō, Mt. Oku-Shirane, Mt. Maeshirane, Mt. Omanago, Mt. Komanako, Mt.Akanagi) as well as the Kegon Falls. It covers 3,400 hectares, which is second only to the Ise Grand Shrine in area. The main shrine is located to the west of Nikkō Tōshō-gū where it was relocated to in 1617. The current shrine buildings date from that reconstruction. 11 buildings in the complex, including the Honden, Haiden are designated as national Important Cultural Properties.

The Middle Shrine is located on the shore of Lake Chuzenji. It was built in 1096. The current buildings were reconstructed in 1699. Seven buildings in the complex including the main shrine are designated as national Important Cultural Properties. The Oku-no-miya is located at the summit of Mount Nantai and was founded in 782. Archaeologists have found relics and ritual instruments from the Nara period confirming the site's age, and many of these artifacts have been designated national Important Cultural Properties.

== History ==
The shrine was founded in 767 by Shōdō Shōnin (勝道上人), a Kegon school Buddhist priest who sought a training ground in the northern mountainous area of Shimotsuke Province. The area had been sacred since at least the Yayoi period as Mount Nantai (also called Futarasan (二荒山)) was a sacred mountain worshipped as a go-shintai (御神体) (a yorishiro housing the enshrined kami), as it supplied streams of water, and therefore life, to the plains below, where people lived.

The mountain was the center of this ancient mountain cult, which merged with the Buddhist Shugendō religion. Significantly, the name Nantai (男体) itself means "man's body". The mountain not only provides water to the rice paddies below, but has the shape of the phallic stone rods found in pre-agricultural Jōmon sites.

According to shrine legend, it was visited by Kukai, who built the Takino Shrine, and by Ennin, who built the Sanbutsu-dō, which is now the Main Hall of the temple of Rinnō-ji, and Nikko became a center for the Tendai school of Buddhism. The shrine was relocated a short distance away from the temple to its current location, and together with the original site and the Takino Shrine was collectively called the Nikkō-sansha. During the Heian period, the shrine appears in various national histories, including the 927 AD Engishiki. There is an ongoing controversy as to whether the Engishiki is referring to this shrine, or the Utsunomiya Futarayama Jinja. This controversy extends to the designation of ichinomiya of former Shimotsuke Province, which is likewise claimed by both shrines.

The shrine suffered during the Sengoku period as many of its estates were seized by the Late Hōjō clan and later by Toyotomi Hideyoshi. The construction of the Nikkō Tōshō-gū in the early Edo Period resulted in the reconstruction of the shrine by Tokugawa Hidetada and support of the shrine by many daimyō and members of the nobility.

From 1871 the shrine was officially designated National Shrine, 2nd rank (国幣中社, kokuhei-chūsha) under Modern system of ranked Shinto Shrinesin State Shinto. In 1998, the grounds of the shrine were included within the National Historic Site designation the Shrines and Temples of Nikkō, which gained World Heritage Site designation the following year.

== Sacred Bridge ==
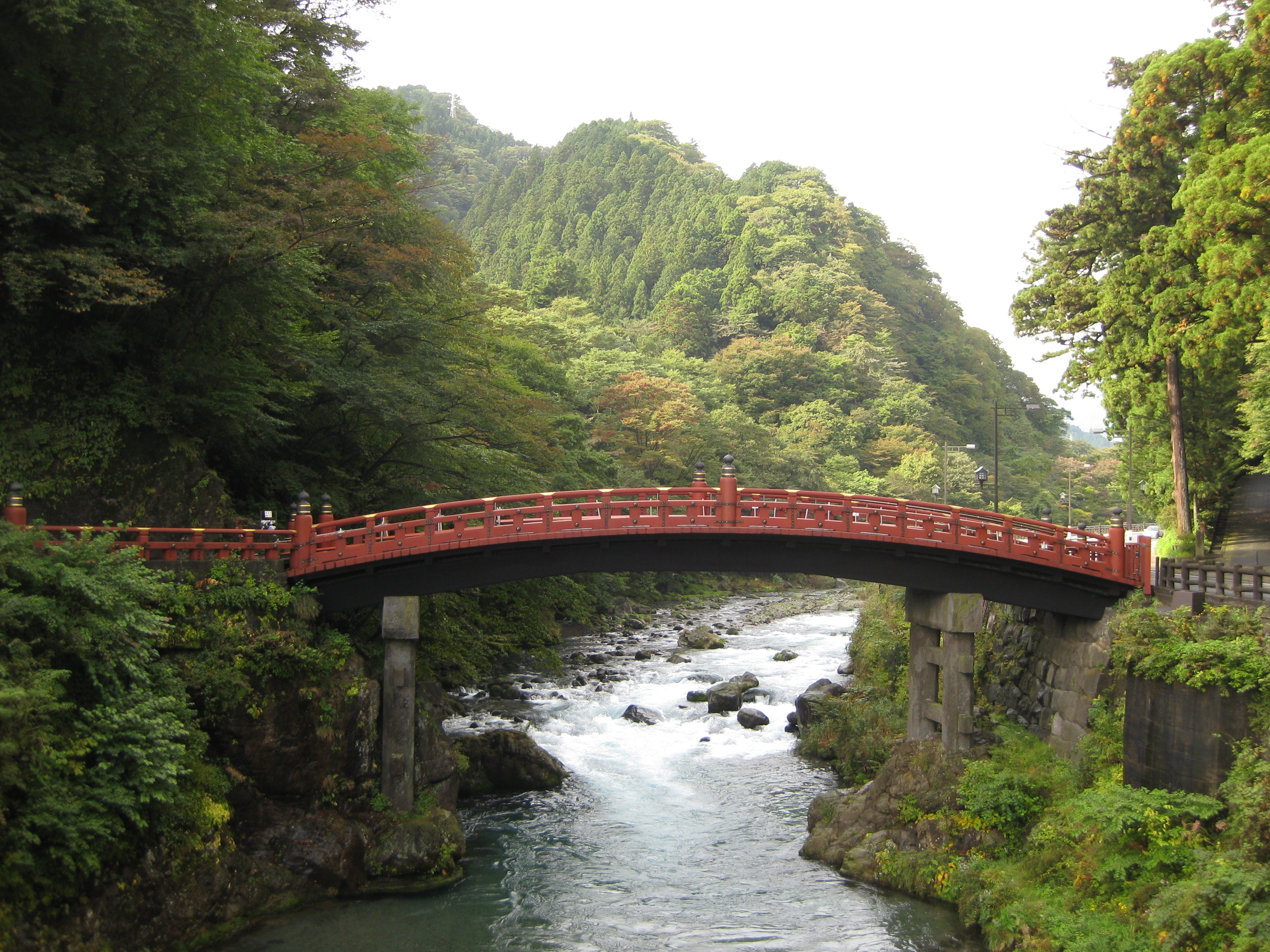
The Sacred Bridge, part of the Futarasan Shrine.

The Sacred Bridge (神橋, shinkyō) crossing the Daiya River belongs to the Futarasan Shrine. This beautiful vermilion lacquered structure is known as one of the three most beautiful bridges in Japan and is a gateway for Nikko. The bridge was registered as a World Heritage in December 1999. The Shinkyo measures 28 meters long, 7.4 meters wide, and stands 10.6 meters above the Daiya River.

According to legend, a priest named Shōdō and his followers climbed Mt. Nantai in the year 766 to pray for national prosperity. They could not cross the fast flowing Daiya River. Shōdō prayed and a 10 foot tall god named Jinja-Daiou appeared with two snakes twisted around his right arm. Jinja-Daiou released the blue and red snakes and they transformed themselves into a rainbow-like bridge covered with sedge, which Shōdō and his followers could use to cross the river. That is why this bridge is sometimes called Yamasugeno-jabashi, which means the "Snake Bridge of Sedge".

The Shinkyō has been rebuilt many times but has followed the same design pattern since 1636, when it could be used only by messengers of the Imperial court. It has been opened to the general public since 1973.

== Photo gallery ==
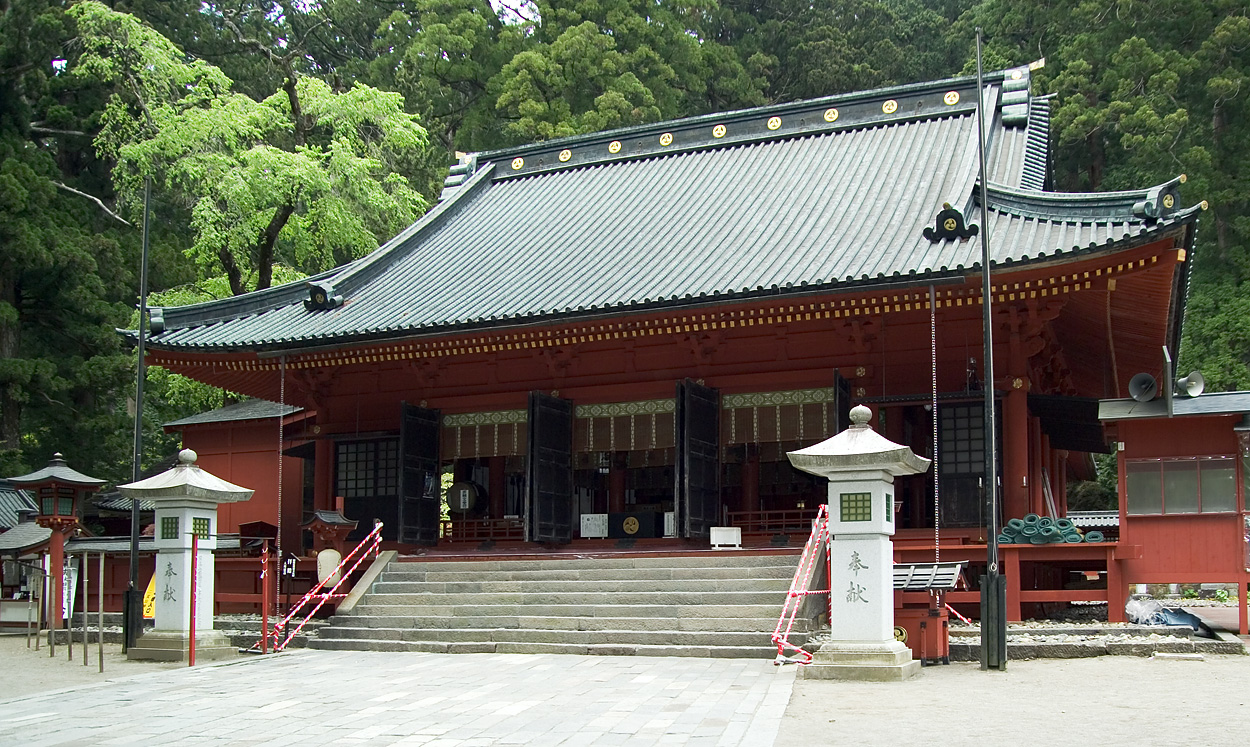
Haiden

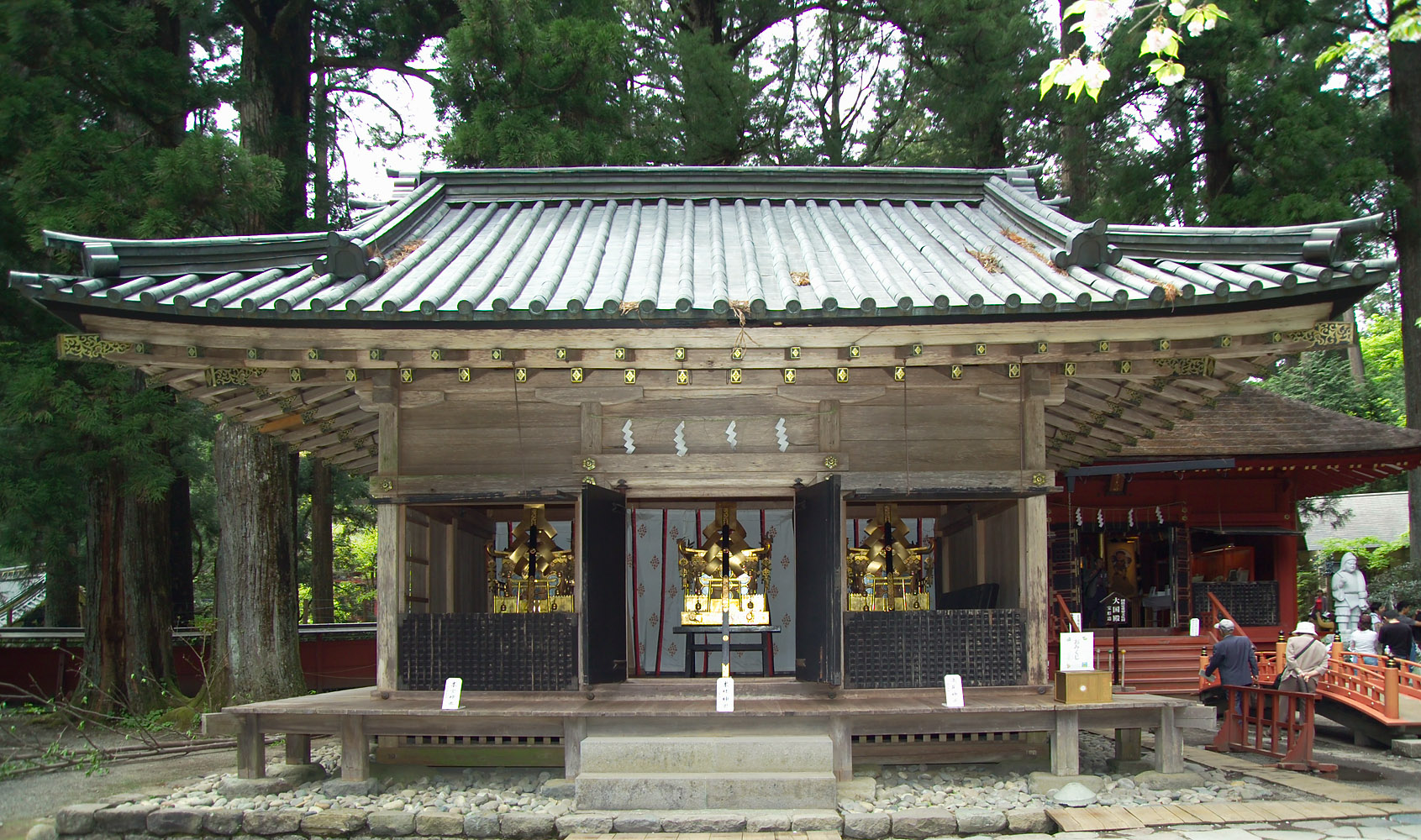
Building housing mikoshi

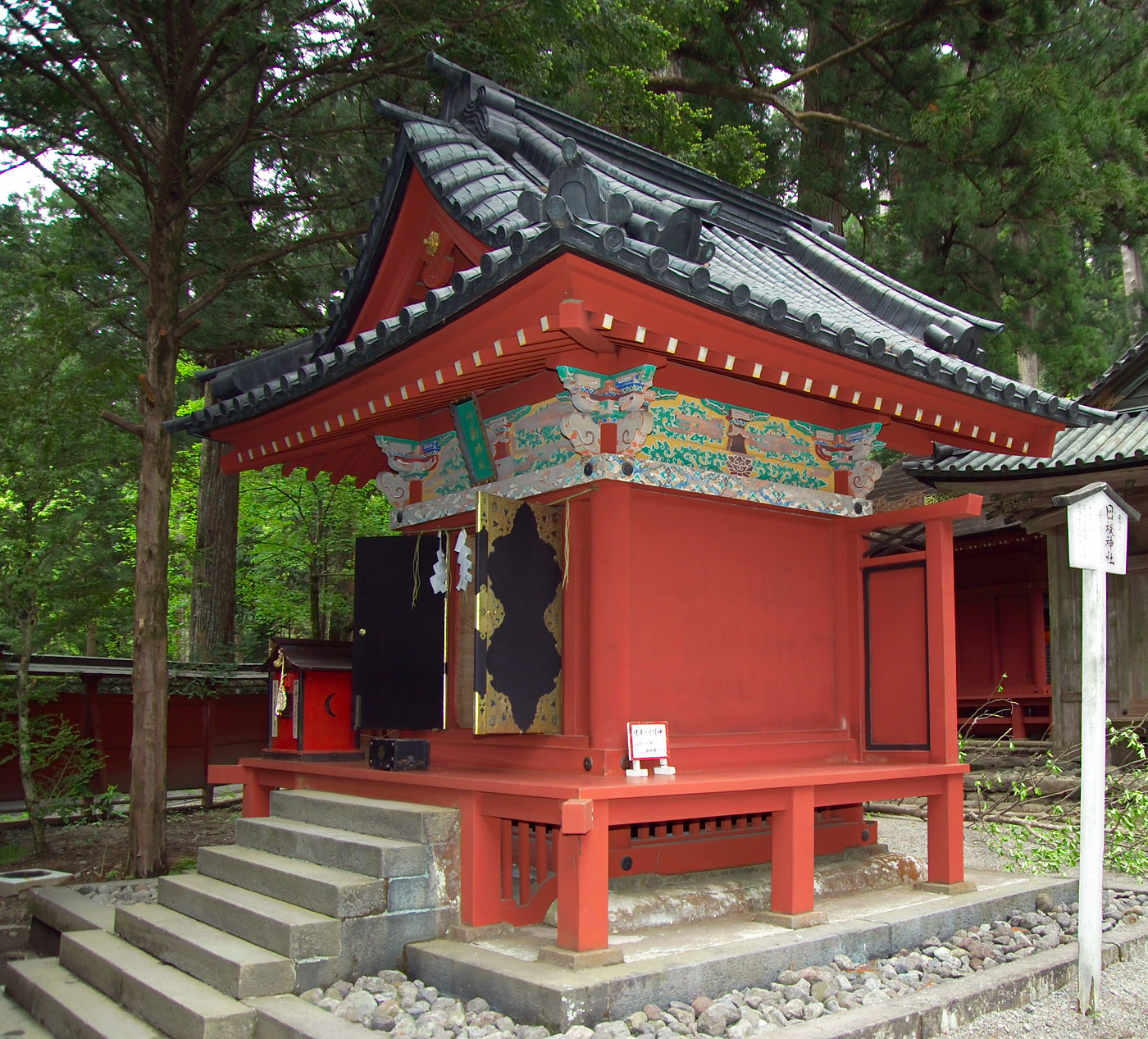
Hie Shrine

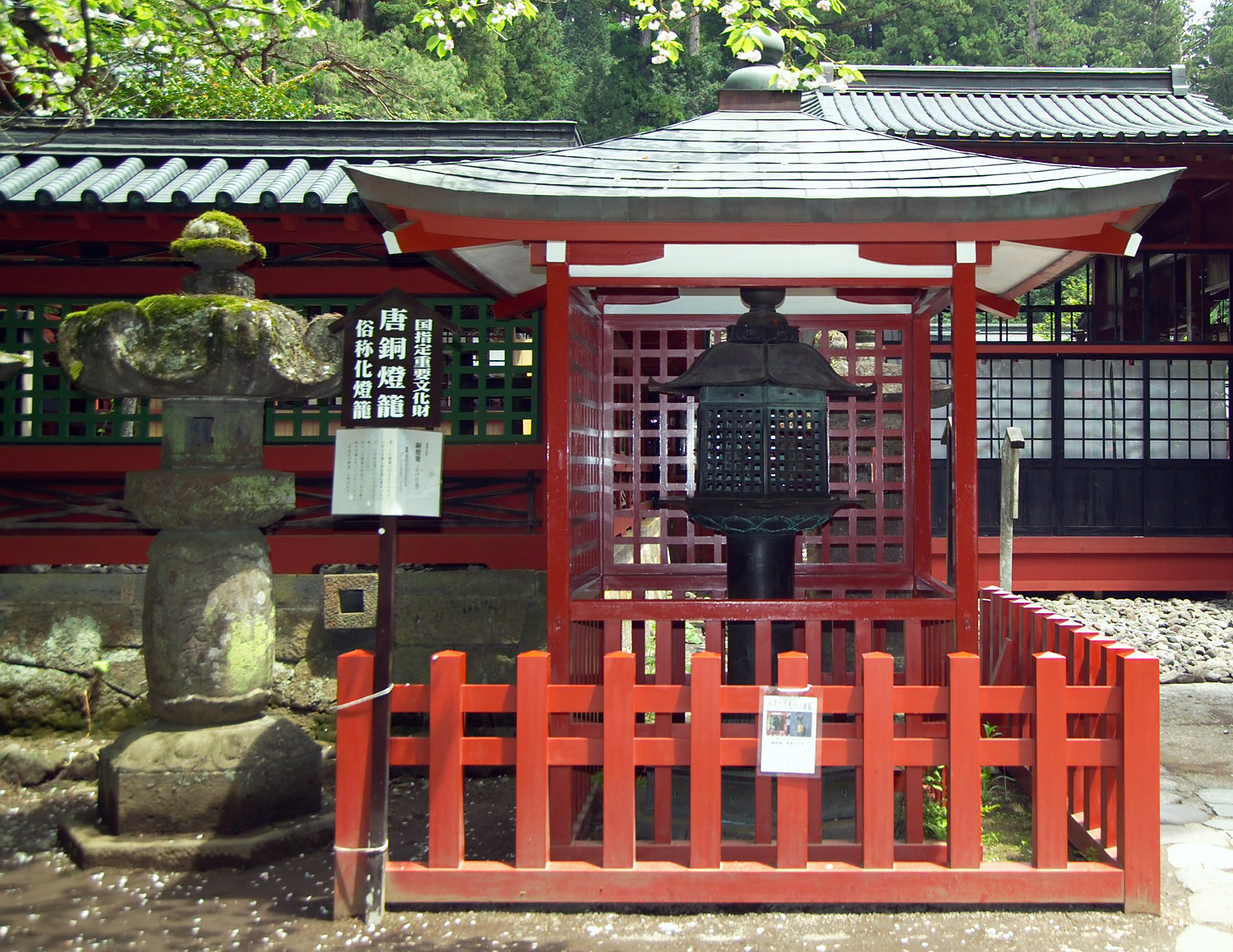
Chinese-style lantern, the Bake-doro ("Ghost Lantern")

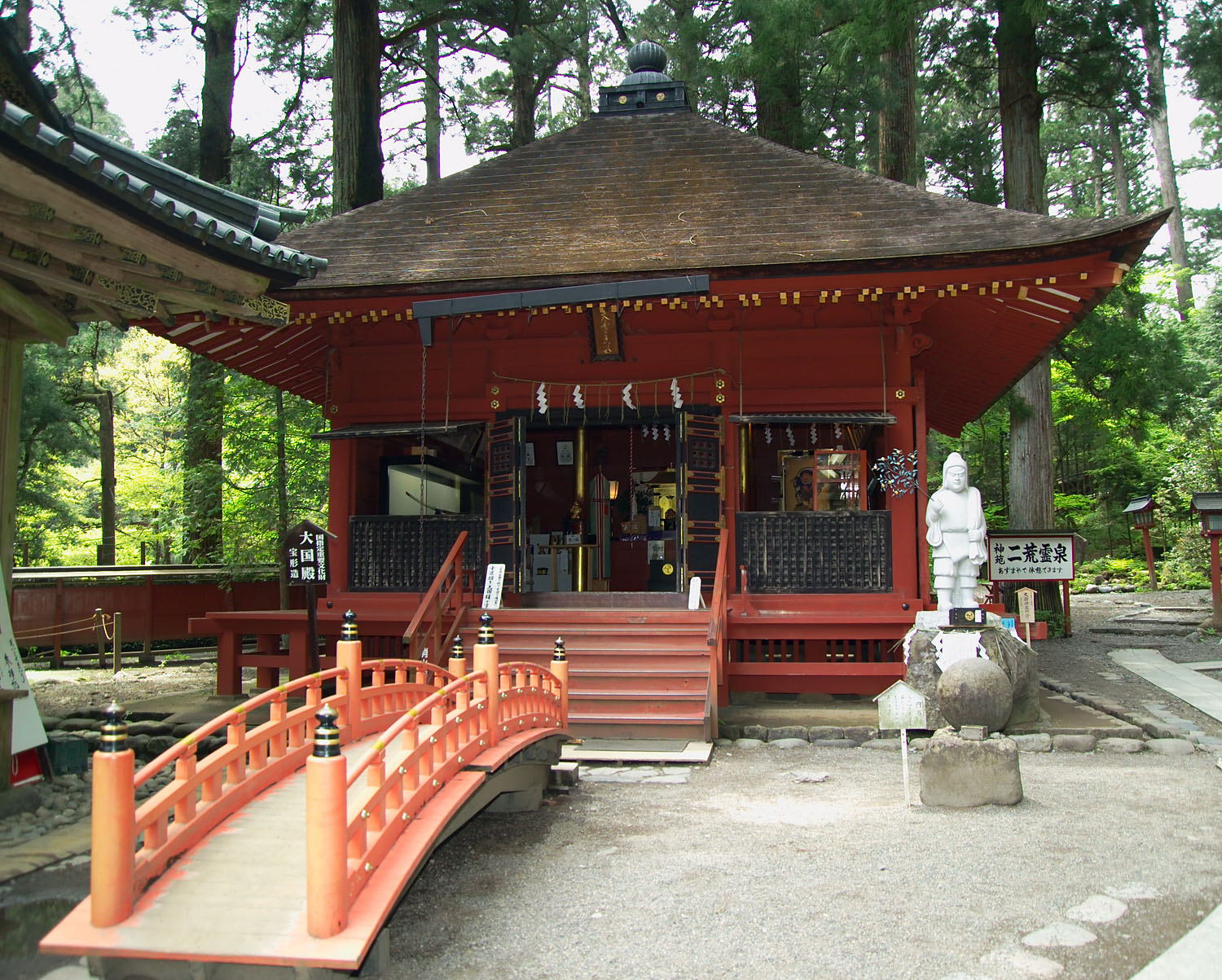
Daikoku-den 大黒殿

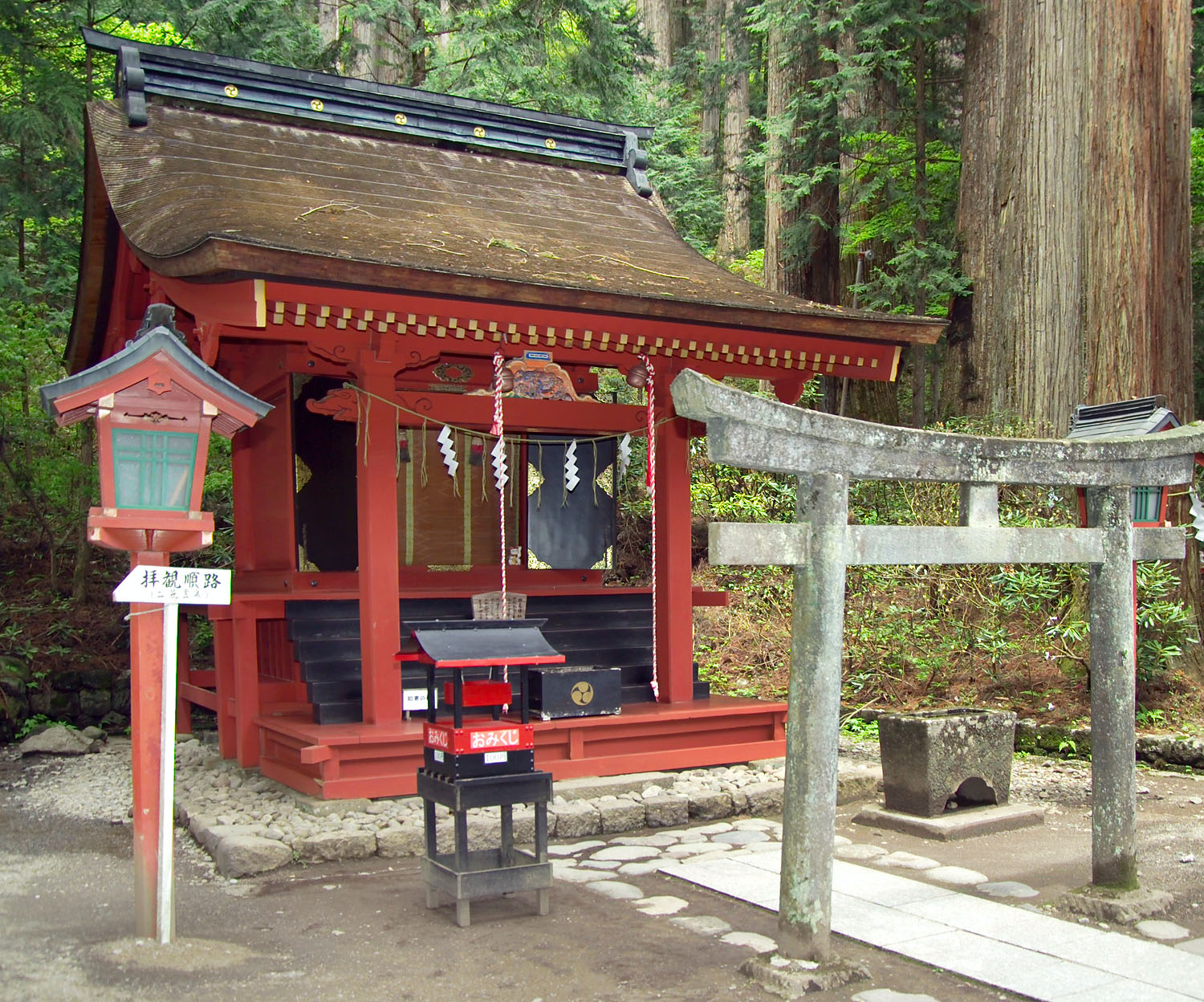
Mitomo Jinja

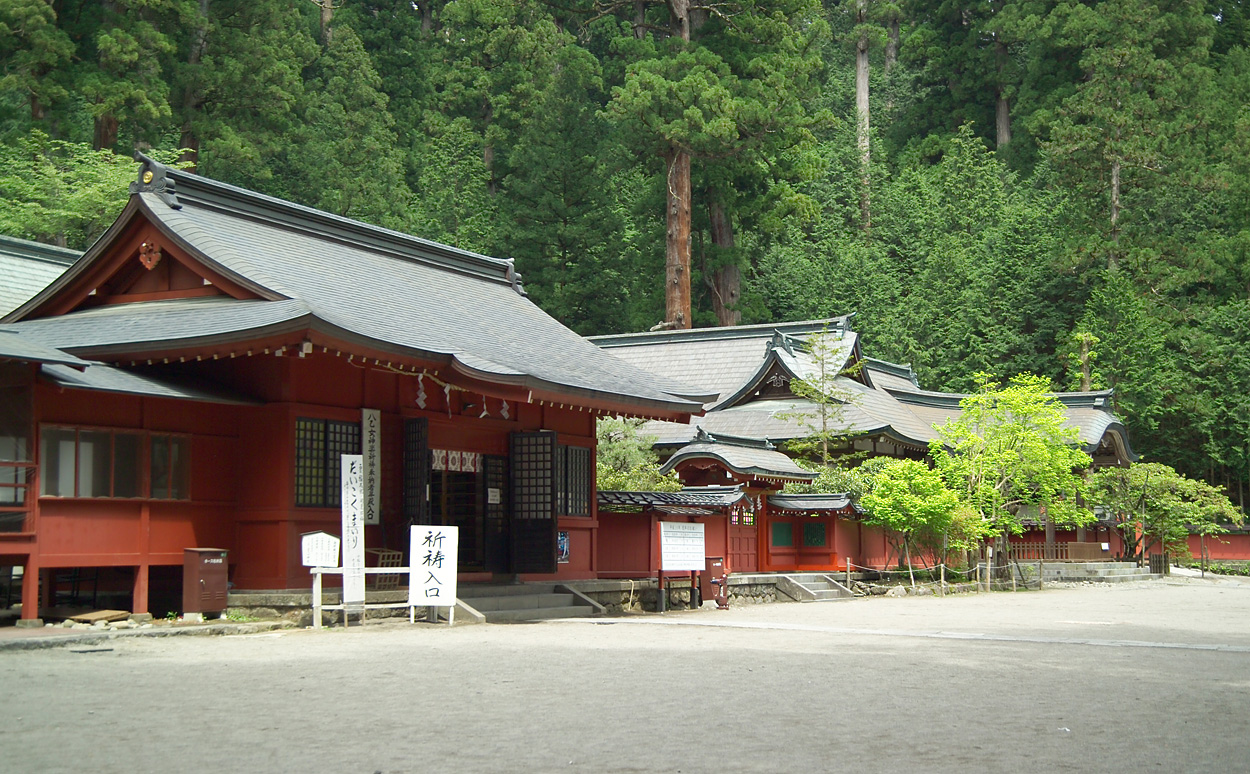
Other buildings at Futarasan Shrine

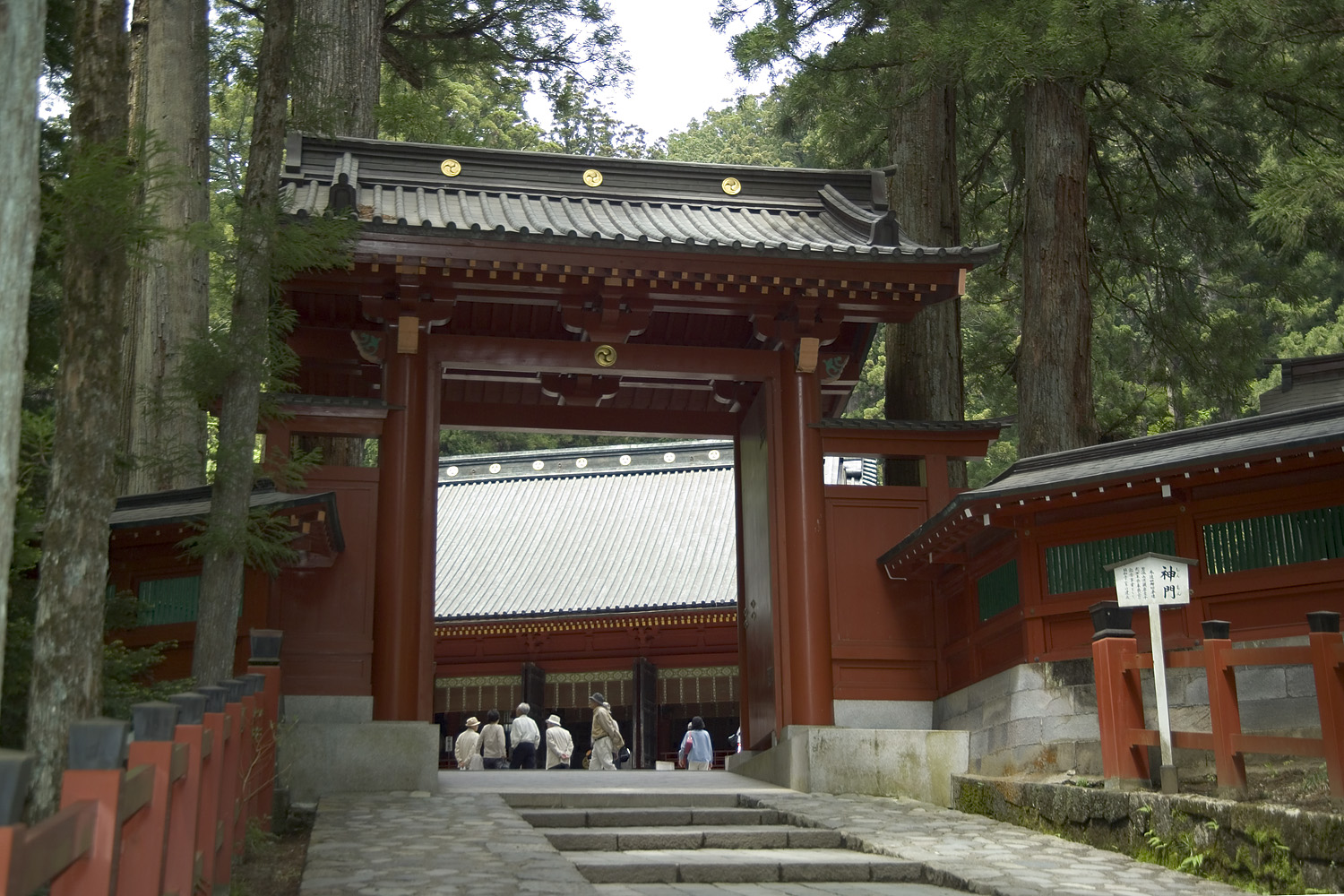
The gate leads to the precincts of the shrine

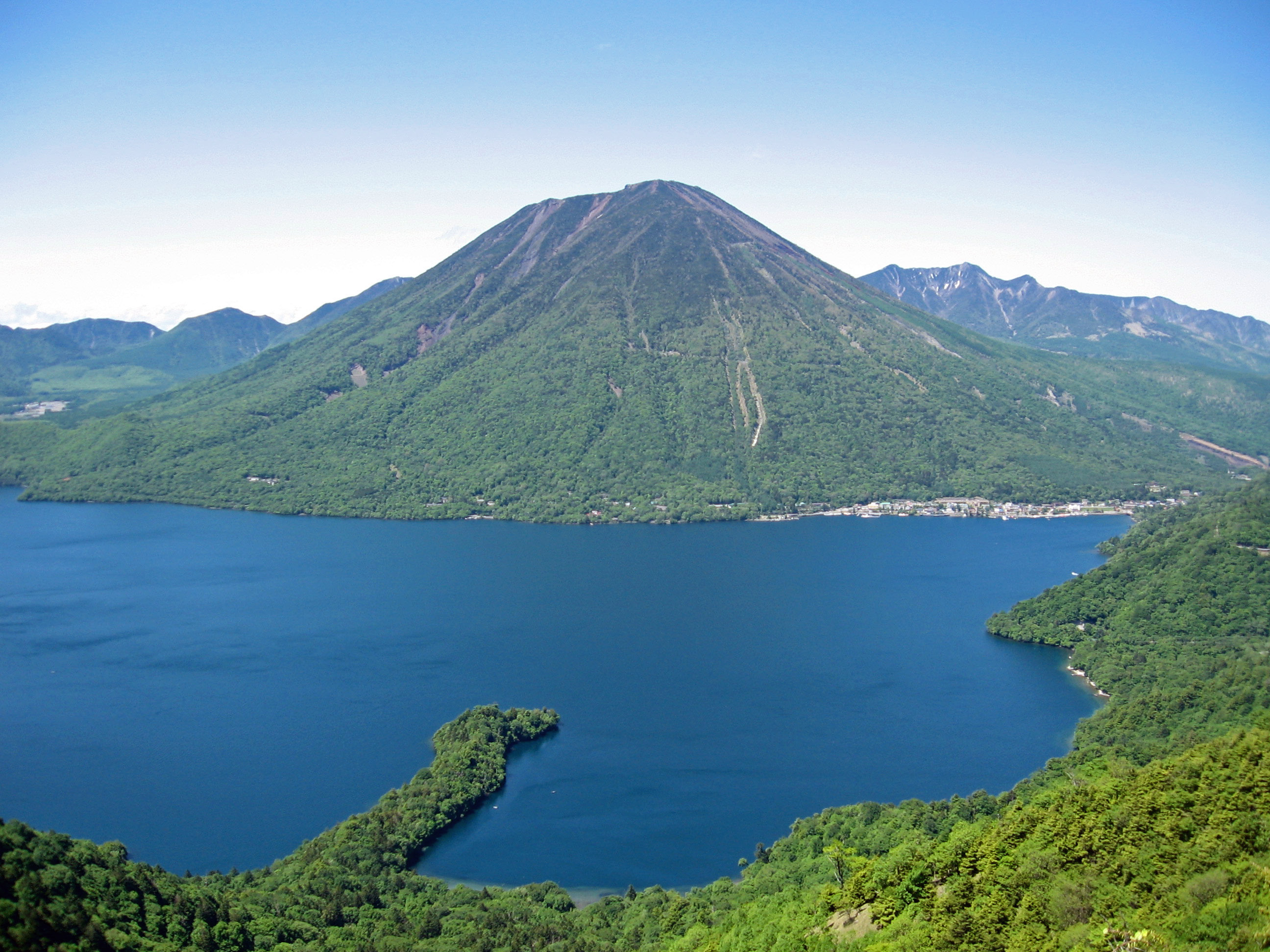
Mount Nantai

== See also ==
- List of National Treasures of Japan (crafts-swords)
- List of Shinto shrines
- Ichinomiya
