= Rinnō-ji =

Tendai Buddhist temple in Nikkō, Tochigi prefecture, Japan

Coordinates: 36.754°N 139.603°E

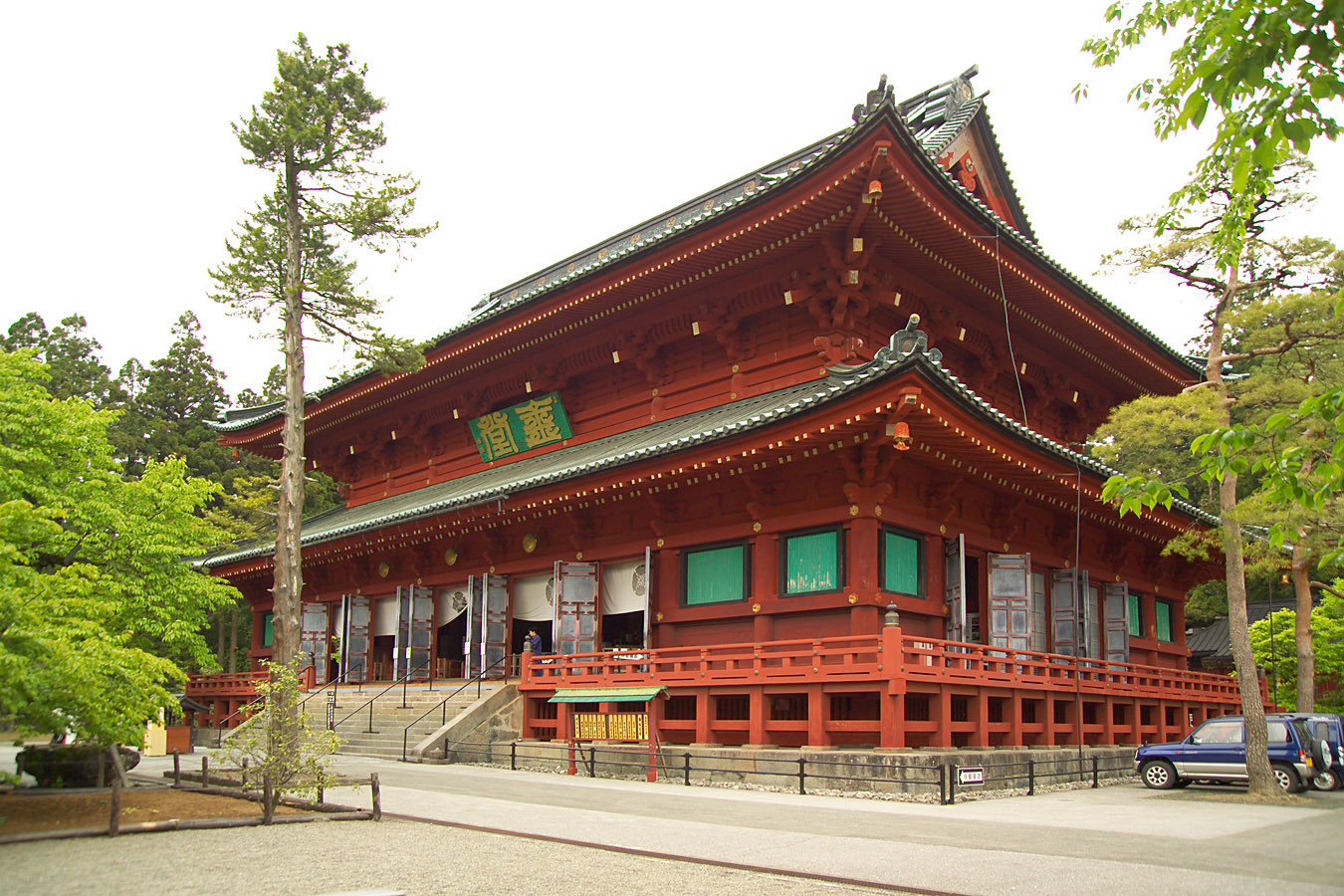

Religion
- Affiliation: Tendai
- Deity: Amida Nyorai; Senju Kannon; Batō Kannon

Location
- Location: 2300 Sannai, Nikkō, Tochigi Prefecture 〒 321-1431
- Country: Japan
- Interactive map of Rinnō-ji

Architecture
- Founder: Shōdō Shōnin
- Completed: 766

Website
- www.rinnoji.or.jp

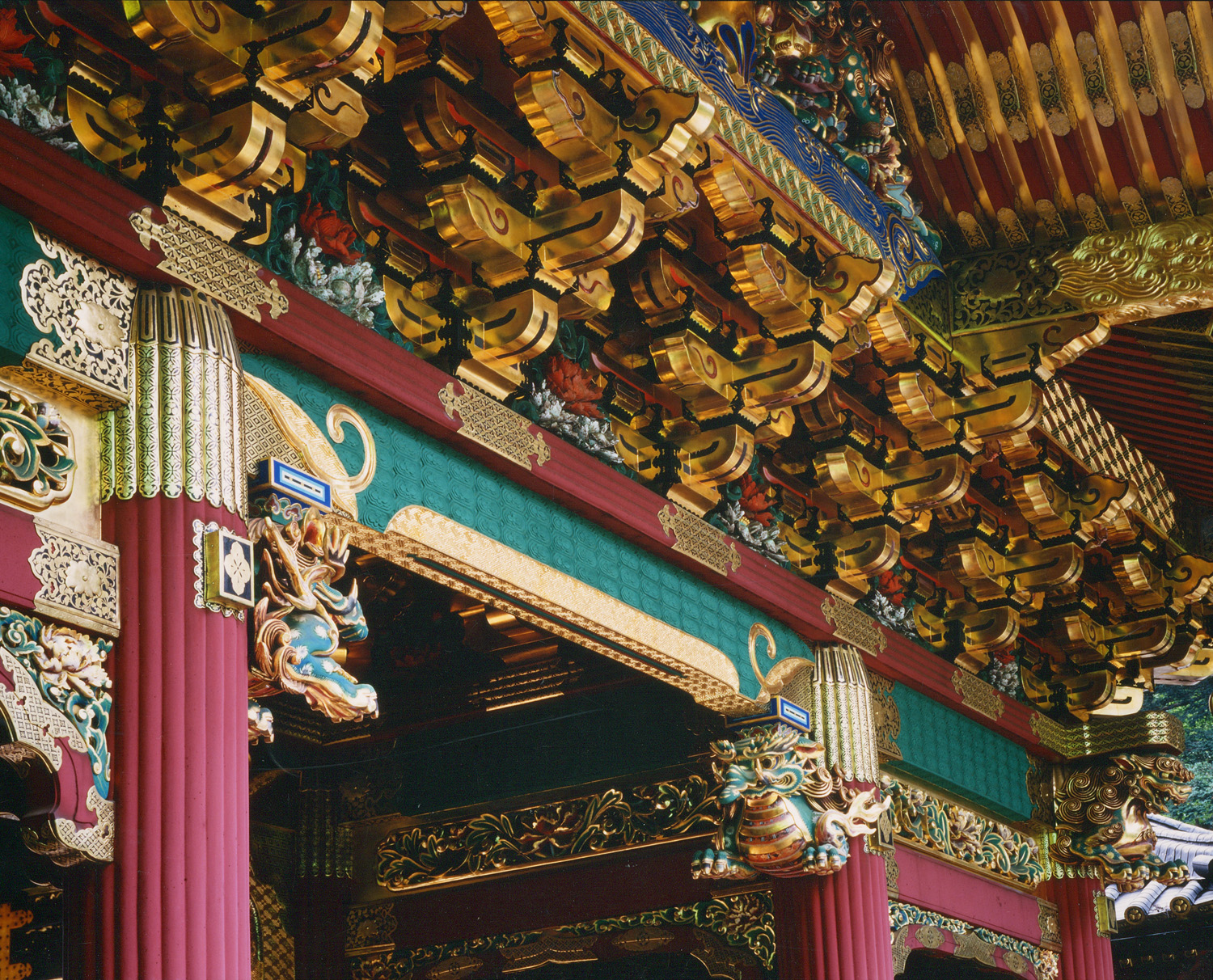
Lavish ornamentation on a building at the Taiyū-in

Rinnō-ji (輪王寺) is a Tendai Buddhist temple in the city of Nikkō, Tochigi Prefecture, Japan.

== History ==
The site was established in 766 by the Buddhist monk Shōdō Shōnin (735–817). Due to its geographic isolation, deep in the mountains of Japan, the site soon attracted other Buddhist monks in search of solitude, and it still is considered an important base for ascetic training among Tendai monks.

Together with Nikkō Tōshō-gū and Futarasan Shrine, it forms the Shrines and Temples of Nikkō UNESCO World Heritage Site, with 42 structures of the shrine included in the nomination.

== Architecture ==
Among the most famous buildings in Rinnō-ji is the Sanbutsudō (三仏堂, Three Buddha Hall). This building features gold-leafed statues of Amida, Senju Kannon ("Kannon with a thousand arms") and Batō Kannon ("Kannon with a horse's head"). These deities are considered as Buddhist manifestations of Nikkō's three mountain kami enshrined at Futarasan Shrine.

Next to the Sanbutsudō Hall there are Shōyō-en Garden and the Rinno-ji Homotsu-den Hall ("Treasure House of Rinnō-ji"). The latter houses an important collection of Buddhist art, including sculptures, paintings, calligraphy, scrolls and other crafts, mainly from the 8th century, and approximately 50 of them are on display at any given time. In addition, the temple houses the Daihatsu nehankyō shūge (大般涅槃経集解, Commentaries on sutras), an important instruction manual of the Nirvana Sutra in 59 handscrolls dated from the Nara and Heian periods. It is designated a National Treasure.

The temple also administers the Taiyū-in Reibyō (大猷院霊廟), which is the mausoleum of Tokugawa Iemitsu (1604–1651), the third Tokugawa shōgun. Technically a shinto shrine, it was built in 1653 in the Gongen-zukuri style and it is designated a National Treasure of Japan in that category. It has been described by the World Heritage Committee as "a pure masterpiece of architecture and decoration". 37 other structures in the temple complex are designated as Important Cultural Properties.

== Chinjō Yasha ==
Chinjō Yasha (鎮将夜叉) is a yakṣa most famously known as the hibutsu enshrined in the Great Goma Hall of Rinnō-ji. He is said to be a manifestation of Vaiśravaṇa and serves as a protector of the state. Chinjō Yasha is revealed to the public once every nine years in a year referred to in Nine Star Astrology as the “Central Palace of the Five Yellow Star" (五黄中宮, Go-ō Chūgū) The most recent public unveiling was on February 3, 2023 (Reiwa 5).

According to the Chinjō Yashahō (鎮将夜叉法) ritual, which has been handed down since the time of Saichō, Chinjō Yasha is believed to possess the spiritual power to turn misfortune into blessings. This is also one of the four major esoteric rituals (四箇大法, Shika Daihō) of Tendai Buddhism. A wooden carving of the deity also exists at Kurama-dera.
