= Otabisho =

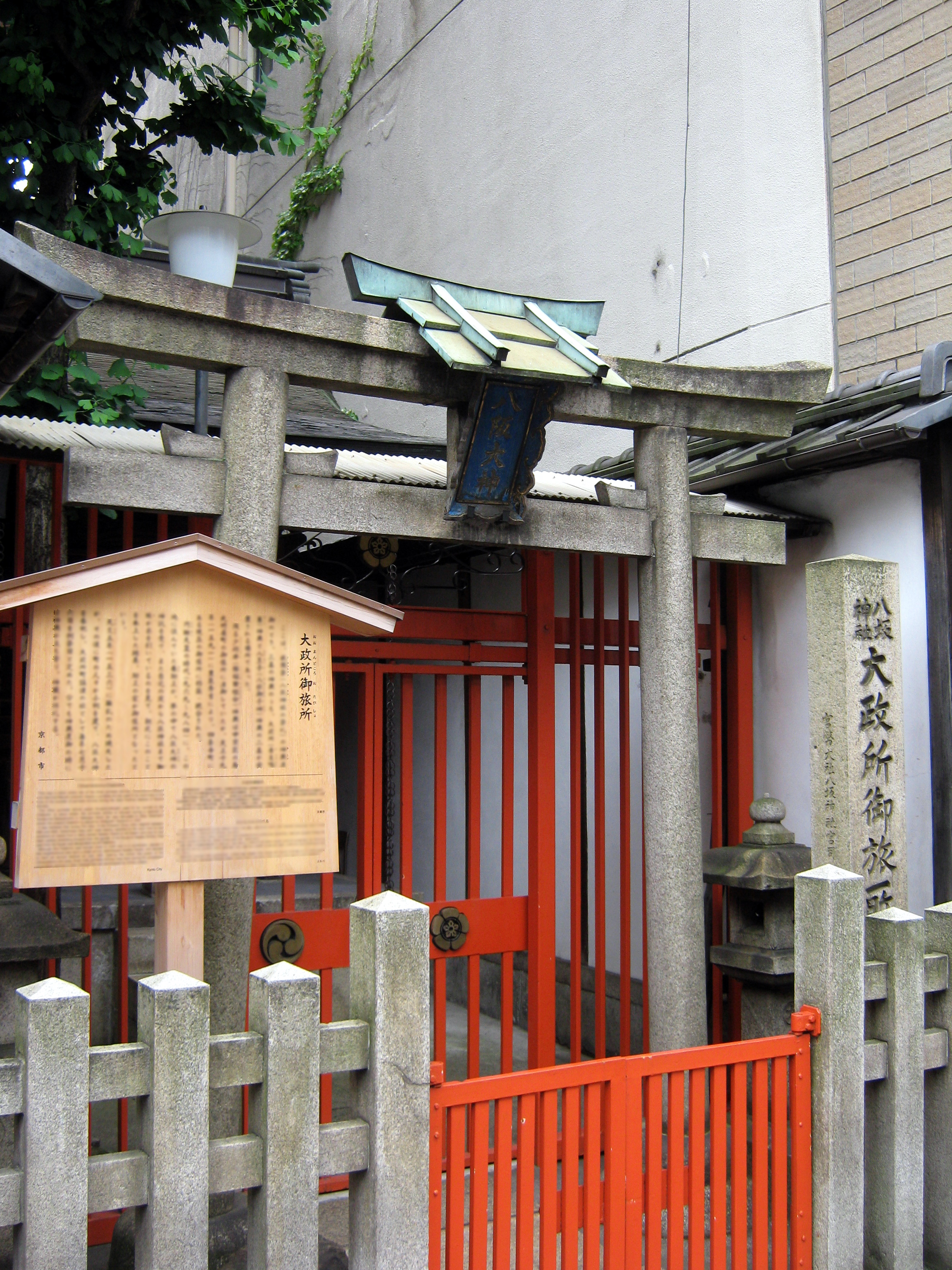
Otabisho of Yasaka Shrine.

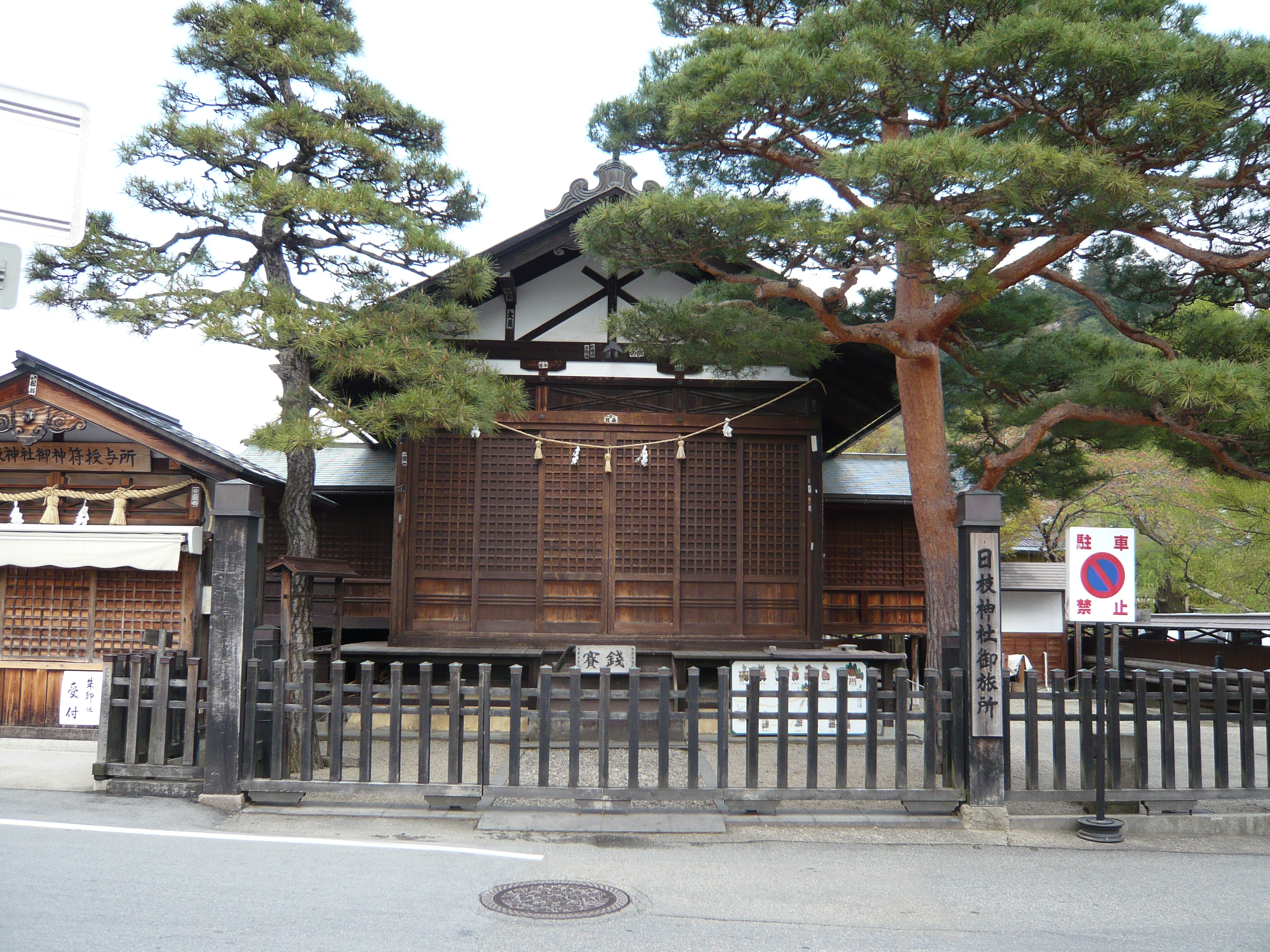
Otabisho in Takayama.

Otabisho (御旅所, lit. "the trip place") is a facility that serves as the temporary destination or midway resting point of a kami (more accurately the mikoshi) in the middle of its ritual procession. In some case, there exist several otabisho locations along the route of the kami. At the arrival of the mikoshi to an otabisho, some rites or a festival is usually observed.
