= Otawara (disambiguation) =

Otawara may refer to:

== Locations ==
- Ōtawara, a city in Tochigi Prefecture, Japan
- Ōtawara Castle, a castle in Ōtawara, Tochigi Prefecture, Japan
- Ōtawara Domain, a Japanese feudal domain of the Edo period

=== Extraterrestrial ===
- 4979 Otawara, a small main-belt asteroid

== People ==
- Ōtawara Kazukiyo (大田原一清; 1861–1930), 14th and final daimyō of the Ōtawara Domain
