= Tochigi Prefectural North Gymnasium =

Arena in Ōtawara, Tochigi, Japan

Coordinates: 36°51′35″N 140°00′5.6″E

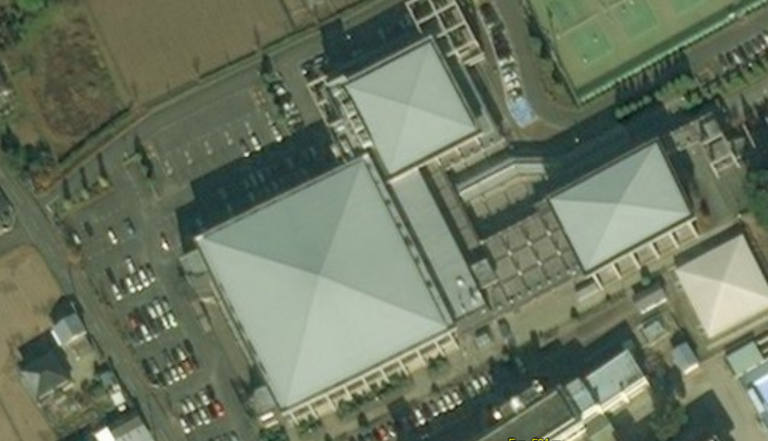
- Interactive map of Tochigi Prefectural North Gymnasium
- Full name: Tochigi Prefectural North Gymnasium 栃木県立県北体育館
- Location: Ōtawara, Tochigi, Japan
- Owner: Tochigi Prefecture
- Operator: Tochigi Prefecture
- Capacity: 2,054

Construction
- Opened: July. 1996
- Cost

Website
- http://www.pref.tochigi.lg.jp/m07/education/sports/shisetsu/kenhokutaiikukan.html

Tochigi Prefectural North Gymnasium is an arena in Ōtawara, Tochigi, Japan.
