= Trafford Training Centre =

Football training ground in England

- Carrington
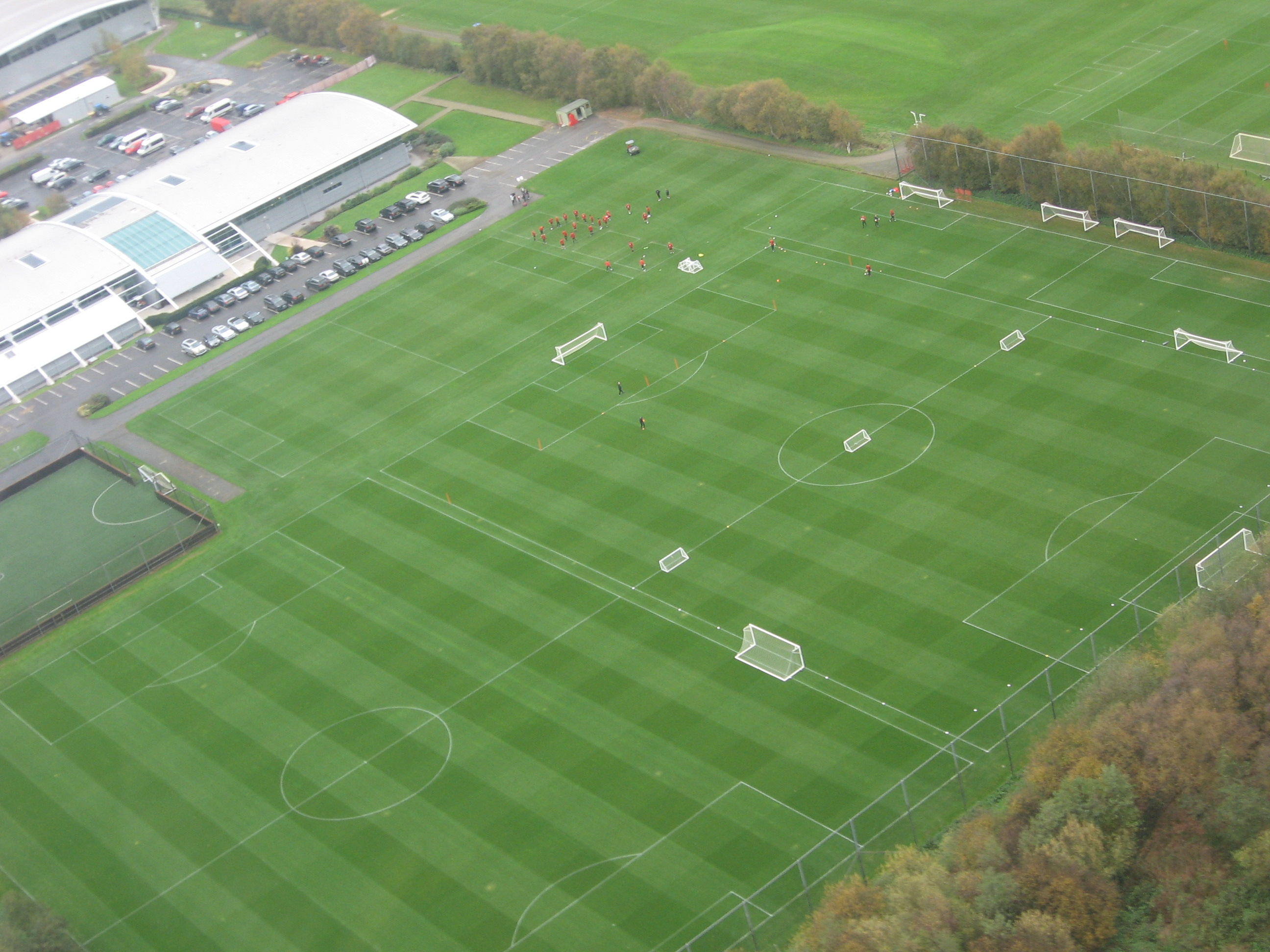
- Manchester United training ground
- Interactive map of Trafford Training Centre
- Former names: Trafford Training Centre
- Location: Carrington, Greater Manchester
- Coordinates: 53°25′04″N 02°22′30″W
- Owner: Manchester United
- Type: Sports training facility
- Surface: Grass pitches (12); Synthetic turf (2)

Construction
- Built: 1999–2002
- Renovated: 2012–2013, 2024–2025
- Cost: Total: £60 million

Tenant
- Manchester United

Trafford Training Centre (usually referred to by the synecdoche of Carrington) is the training ground and academy headquarters of English football club Manchester United. It is near the village of Carrington, Greater Manchester, England, and replaced The Cliff as the club's training ground in 2000. Construction on the complex began in 1999, with the first team taking up residence of the completed main building in 2000, followed in 2002 by the Academy facility — home to the club's youth system. In 2013, major additions were completed at the complex, including a medical centre and sports science department.

Towards the end of the 1990s, Manchester United manager Alex Ferguson increasingly felt that the club's training ground at The Cliff — which had been in continuous use since 1938 — would prove incapable of meeting the competitive requirements of the Premier League as it entered the 21st century. Ferguson was also unhappy about the lack of privacy at The Cliff, with journalists present on a daily basis, opposition team scouts able to watch training sessions, and supporters asking for autographs and photographs with players. The club's board set about finding a new location for their training ground, and purchased more than 100 acres of secluded land in Carrington – less than 10 miles (16 km) from Old Trafford stadium. Construction began in 1999, with a budget of £22 million, of which £14 million was spent on the Main Building (first team) which opened in the summer of 2000, and a further £8 million spent on the Academy Facility, opening in the summer of 2002. A new £25 million medical and sports science facility was constructed on the grounds in 2013. This brought the total cost of construction to over £60 million. Approximately 300 people work at Carrington on a daily basis.

On 8 August 2025, the club officially inaugurated the enhanced Trafford Training Centre, featuring major improvements in medical, sports science, and academy facilities. The £50 million upgrade was initiated by Jim Ratcliffe and took 12 months to complete, being delivered “on time and within budget.”

== Facilities ==
=== Main building ===
The main building, which houses the Manchester United first team, was opened in the pre-season of 2000. It comprises two levels. The ground floor includes; a large gymnasium, indoor running tracks, rehabilitation training hall, squash and basketball courts, weights room, 25-metre swimming pool, remedial and hydrotherapy pools, spa pool, jacuzzi, underwater treadmills, sauna and steam rooms, sunbeds (for Vitamin D), yoga rooms, administration and executive offices, seven team changing rooms, staff changing rooms, laundry rooms and five kit/boot rooms. The first floor includes; the first team manager's office (overlooking outdoor training pitches), manager's personal assistant office, assistant manager's office, coaches offices, match and opposition analysis suite, physiotherapy treatment rooms (with ten physio beds), massage rooms, first aid station, doctor's office, physio's office (overlooking swimming pools, rehab hall, and weight room), classrooms, conference rooms, charity staff offices (Manchester United Foundation), restaurant seating over 100 people, players' lounge, recreation and games rooms, as well as an elevated, covered viewing gallery overlooking the outdoor pitches. The building was extended and updated in 2013, and renovated in 2024-25.

=== The Academy ===
The Academy Facility, which houses the Under-21s, was opened in the close-season of 2002 by club legend Bobby Charlton, himself a graduate of the club's Academy. The Academy Facility comprises two levels. The ground floor includes; a full-size indoor football pitch with a synthetic AstroTurf surface, a full-size outdoor football pitch with heated and floodlit AstroTurf surface (built to specifications of the pitch at Old Trafford), eleven dressing rooms for; youth teams, coaches and referees, coaches briefing rooms, kit/boot room, player treatment facility and physio's office. The first floor includes; indoor viewing balcony overlooking indoor pitch, outdoor viewing balcony overlooking outdoor pitches, visitors and parents lounge, staff training rooms and an MUTV television studio. The club's soccer schools also use the Academy Facility, and young students can avail themselves of the education facilities at the ground.

=== Medical and sports science department ===
In 2012, work began on a new £25 million medical facility at the site. It was completed in early 2013, and includes a state-of-the-art hospital wing and sports science department for treating player injuries and assisting in recuperation, with treatment rooms and offices for; doctors, physiotherapists, sports scientists, sports psychologists, statisticians and dieticians. The facility was supplied with £13 million worth of medical equipment by Toshiba Medical Systems, as part of its sponsorship with the club, and the medical centre is fitted with x-ray computed tomography (CT), magnetic resonance imaging (MRI) and ultrasound scanners, as well as other high-tech screening equipment normally reserved for hospitals.

=== Women's team ===
In 2023, Manchester United opened a new facility specifically designed for their women's first team.

=== Outdoor facilities ===
The site covers a total area of 108 acres (440,000 m^{2}), of which 85 acres are used by the club. On the grounds, there are a total of 14 football pitches of varying sizes; 12 of which are grass pitches (with drainage, irrigation sprinklers, under-soil heating and floodlights), one full-size outdoor floodlit and heated AstroTurf all-weather pitch, one full-size indoor floodlit and heated AstroTurf artificial pitch and a special goalkeeper training area. Desso GrassMaster playing surfaces are used, the same surface as the pitch at Old Trafford. The unused 23 acres of remaining land includes a small nature reserve, maintained by the club and the Cheshire Wildlife Trust. There are two ponds, which are used as part of the waste water treatment system.

=== Security ===
Carrington is considered one of the most secretive and secure sports training facilities in Europe. The media and locals have dubbed the complex "Fortress Carrington", due to the security measures in place at the grounds. There is a 2.4 kilometres (1.5 mi) long, 8 metre (26 feet) high security wall, video surveillance cameras, intrusion detection systems and over 30,000 trees have been planted surrounding the site, rendering it impossible to see into the premises. The complex is staffed 24/7 by a security team, who conduct roaming patrols, in order to prevent members of the media and opposition spies from gaining access to team practice sessions for upcoming matches. Fans are prohibited from entering the facility, and are also banned from requesting autographs and photographs from the players outside it. During the season, the media is allowed into the complex only once a week when the manager briefs the press before games, and they are only ever allowed to take photographs and videos of the team training ahead of home Champions League or Europa League fixtures – due to UEFA regulations – and for just 15 minutes. There are no road signs or markings indicating the existence of the complex. There are a number of entrances into the complex, all guarded by security barriers and protected by security staff. There is also a helipad at the training ground, used for player medicals and transfers, and by the club's owners, the Glazer family.

== Sponsorship ==
In April 2013, Manchester United announced an eight-year naming rights agreement with Aon that would see the Trafford Training Centre renamed as the Aon Training Complex until 2021. The deal has been estimated to be worth £180 million (£22.5 million per-year), three times the club's outlay on the training complex itself (£60 million). Toshiba Medical Systems, as part of its five-year sponsorship agreement with the club, provided £13 million of medical systems to the complex in 2013.

== See also ==
- The Cliff Training Ground
- Old Trafford Stadium
- Manchester United Academy
- Manchester United Television (MUTV)
