= International University of Health and Welfare =

Private university in Japan

Coordinates: 36.870219°N 140.069207°E

- 国際医療福祉大学
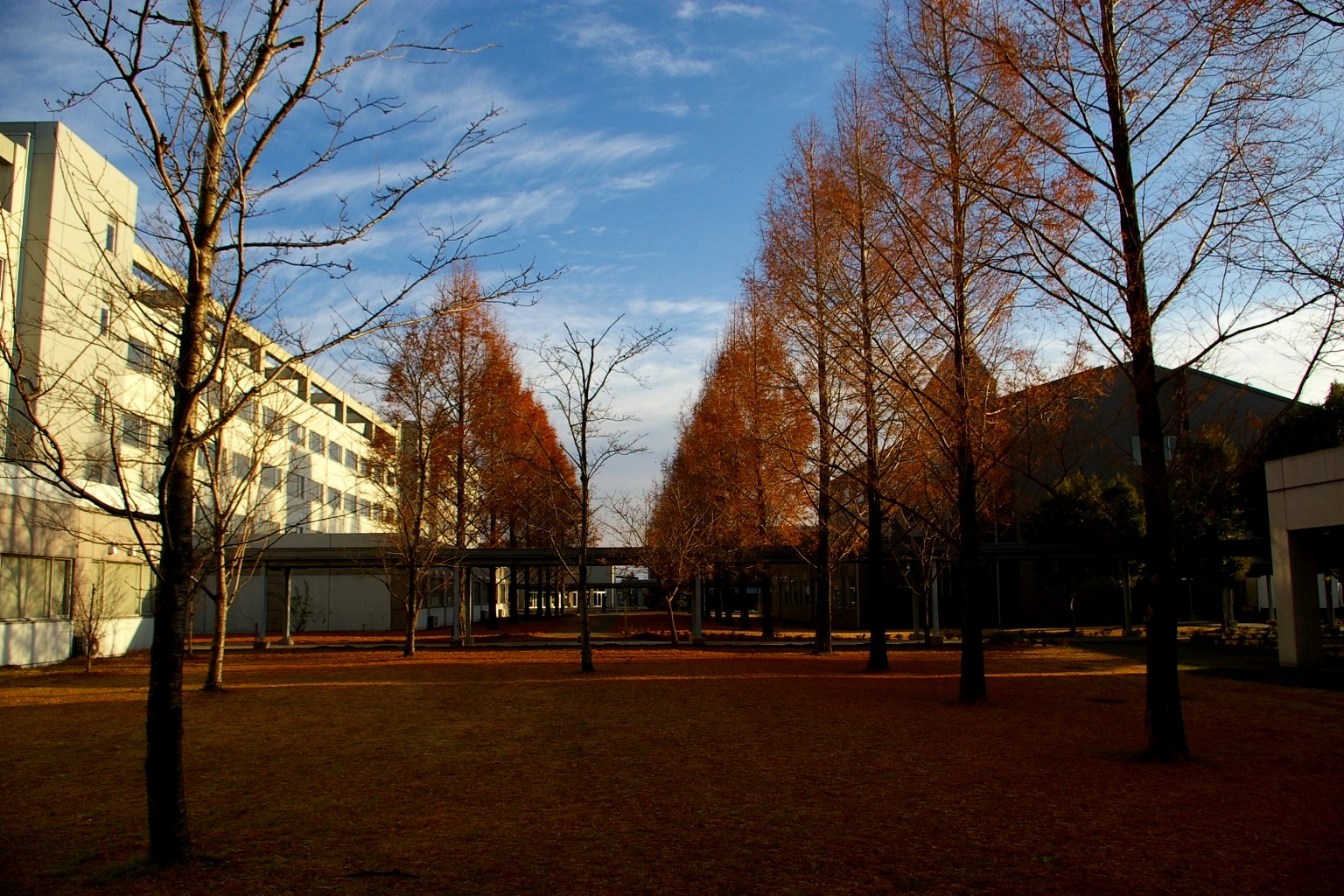
- International University of Health and Welfare
- Type: Private
- Established: 1995
- Chairman: Kuninori Takagi
- President: Kuni Ohtomo
- Location: Ōtawara, Tochigi, Japan
- Website: http://www.iuhw.ac.jp/en/

International University of Health and Welfare (国際医療福祉大学, Kokusai iryō fukushi daigaku) is a private university in Ōtawara, Tochigi, Japan, established in 1995.

== Campuses ==
=== Ohtawara Campus in Tochigi Prefecture ===
- School of Health Sciences
- School of Health and Welfare
- School of Pharmacy

=== Narita Campus in Chiba Prefecture ===
- School of Nursing at Narita
- School of Health Sciences at Narita
- School of Medicine

=== Odawara Campus in Kanagawa Prefecture ===
- School of Health Sciences at Odawara

=== Fukuoka Campus in Fukuoka Prefecture ===
- School of Nursing at Fukuoka

=== Okawa Campus in Fukuoka Prefecture ===
- School of Health Sciences at Fukuoka
