= Canon Medical Systems Corporation =

Japanese medical equipment company

- Formerly: Toshiba Medical Systems (1948–2016)
- Type: Subsidiary
- Industry: Medical electronics
- Founded: September 23, 1948; 78 years ago
- Headquarters: Ōtawara, Tochigi, Japan
- Area served: Worldwide
- Key people: Toshio Takiguchi
- Parent: Canon Inc.
- Website: global.medical.canon

Canon Medical Systems Corporation is a Japanese medical equipment company based in Ōtawara, Tochigi, Japan. Previously known as Toshiba Medical, it was formerly a subsidiary of Toshiba. The company was initially an early pioneer of X-ray tubes in Japan. The company was acquired by Canon Inc. in 2016. Canon Medical Systems currently produces medical equipment such as MRI and helical CT machines.

Canon Medical Systems is, as of late 2012, the Official Medical Systems Partner of the Manchester United FC football team on a multi-million 5-year contract.

== Major competitors ==
Major competitors of CMSC (Canon Medical Systems Corporation) include:

- GE Healthcare
- Hitachi Medical Systems
- Philips Healthcare
- Siemens Healthineers
