= Ōtawara =

Ōtawara 大田原市
- City
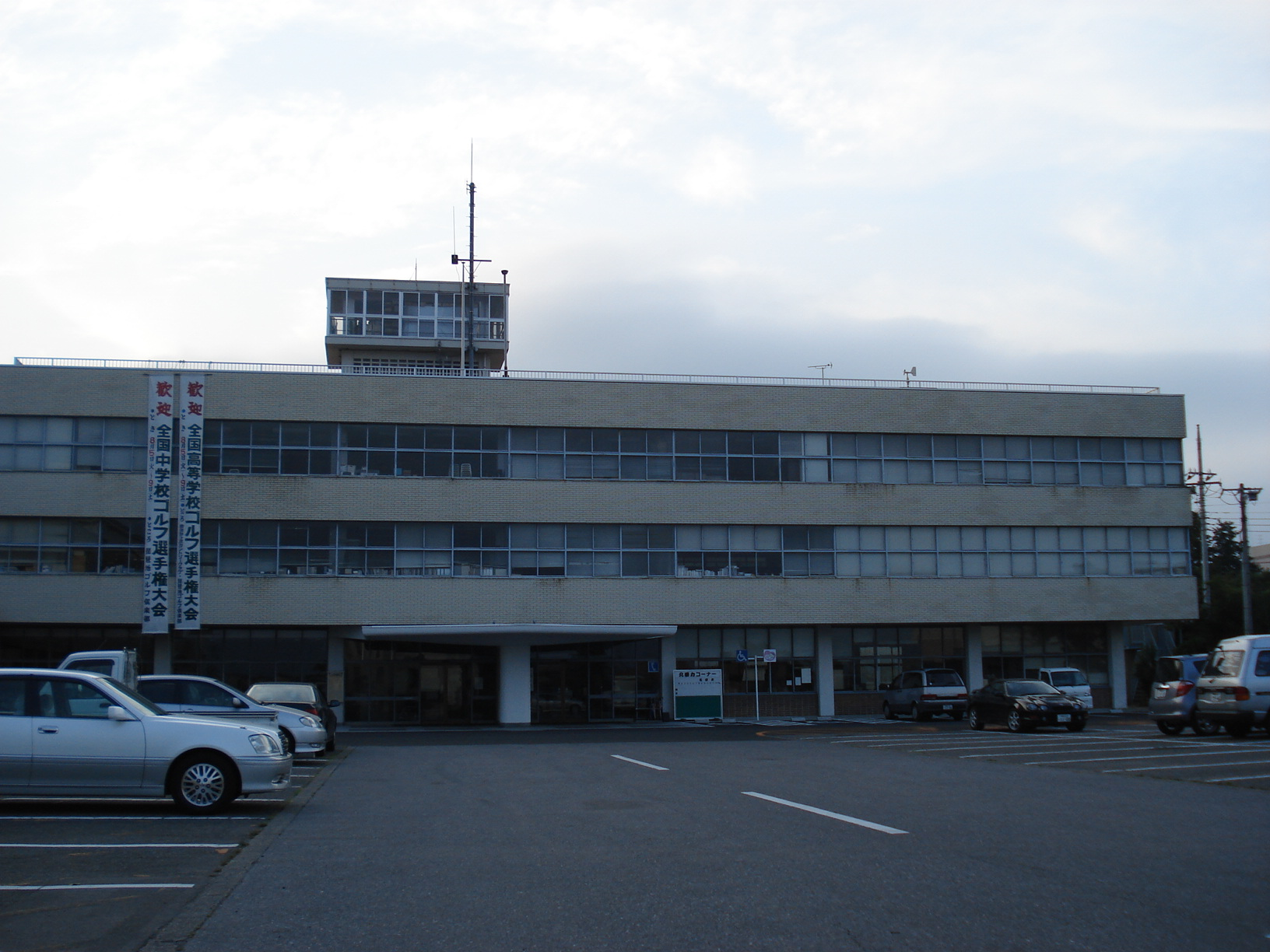
- Ōtawara City Hall

- Flag Seal

- Location of Ōtawara in Tochigi Prefecture

- Coordinates: 36°52′16″N 140°0′56″E
- Country: Japan
- Region: Kantō
- Prefecture: Tochigi
- First official recorded: late 3rd century (official)
- Town settled: April 1, 1889
- City settled: December 1, 1954

Government
  - Mayor: Kenichi Sōma (from April 2022)

Area
  - Total: 354.36 km^{2} (136.82 sq mi)

Population (July 2020)
  - Total: 73,189
  - Density: 206.54/km^{2} (534.93/sq mi)
- Time zone: UTC+9 (Japan Standard Time)
- Phone number: 0287-23-1111
- Address: 1-4-1 Honchō, Ōtawara-shi, Tochigi-ken 324-8641
- Climate: Cfa
- Website: Official website
- Symbols
- Fish: Tokyo bitterling
- Flower: Chrysanthemum
- Tree: Ginkgo biloba

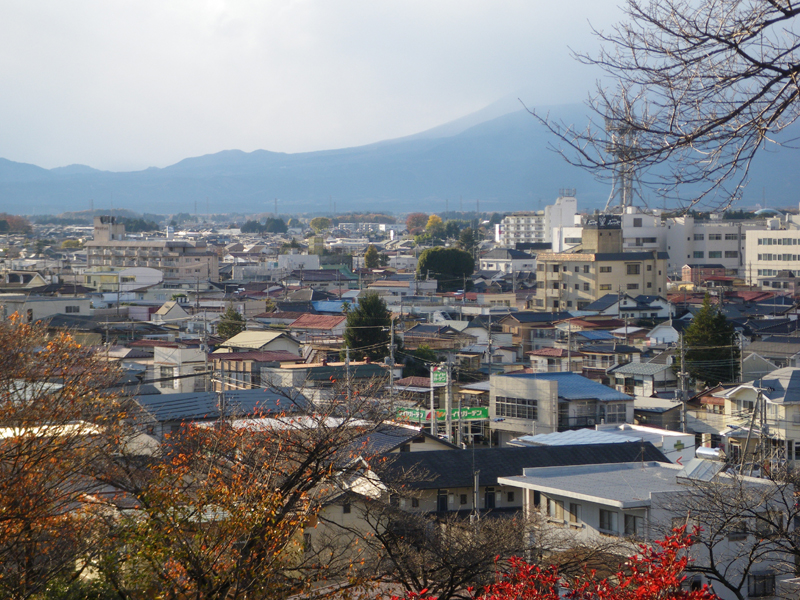
View from the ruins of Ōtawara Castle

Ōtawara (大田原市, Ōtawara-shi; Japanese pronunciation: [ò̞ó̞.tä́.β̞ä̀.ɾä̀, -β̞ä́.ɾä́.ɕì, ó̞ó̞-]) is a city located in Tochigi Prefecture, Japan. As of 1 July 2020, the city had an estimated population of 72,189 in 30,136 households, and a population density of 210 persons per km^{2}. The total area of the city is 354.36 square kilometres (136.82 sq mi). The city's name may also be spelled "Ohtawara" as indicated by the official city website.

== Geography ==
Ōtawara is located in northeast Tochigi Prefecture in the foothills of the Nasu region. About 50% of Ōtawara is covered by rice fields with about 12% being mountains and forests. The average elevation of Ōtawara is 217.76 meters. Ōtawara is approximately 40 kilometers north of Utsunomiya, the capital of Tochigi, and approximately 50 km east of the historic city of Nikkō. The city is long in the east and west direction, and the eastern side of the city is bordered by Ibaraki and Fukushima prefectures. The Yamizo Mountains extend along the prefectural border with Ibaraki Prefecture in the eastern part of the prefecture. Rivers include the Naka River, which runs north–south in the eastern part of the city.

=== Surrounding municipalities ===
Fukushima Prefecture

- Tanagura

Ibaraki Prefecture

- Daigo

Tochigi Prefecture

- Nakagawa
- Nasu
- Nasushiobara
- Sakura
- Yaita

=== Climate ===
Ōtawara has a humid subtropical climate (Köppen Cfa) characterized by warm summers and cold winters with heavy snowfall. The average annual temperature in Ōtawara is 12.9 °C (55.2 °F). The average annual rainfall is 1,522.6 mm (59.94 in) with June through July as the wettest month. The temperatures are highest on average in August, at around 24.4 °C (75.9 °F), and lowest in January, at around 1.7 °C (35.1 °F).

Climate data for Ōtawara (1991−2020 normals, extremes 1976−present)
Month	Jan	Feb	Mar	Apr	May	Jun	Jul	Aug	Sep	Oct	Nov	Dec	Year
Record high °C (°F)	18.0 (64.4)	21.5 (70.7)	24.7 (76.5)	29.9 (85.8)	34.0 (93.2)	34.8 (94.6)	37.1 (98.8)	37.2 (99.0)	35.0 (95.0)	30.8 (87.4)	23.6 (74.5)	22.9 (73.2)	37.2 (99.0)
Mean daily maximum °C (°F)	7.4 (45.3)	8.5 (47.3)	12.1 (53.8)	17.6 (63.7)	22.3 (72.1)	25.0 (77.0)	28.4 (83.1)	29.8 (85.6)	26.0 (78.8)	20.5 (68.9)	15.1 (59.2)	9.9 (49.8)	18.6 (65.4)
Daily mean °C (°F)	1.7 (35.1)	2.6 (36.7)	5.9 (42.6)	11.3 (52.3)	16.5 (61.7)	20.0 (68.0)	23.5 (74.3)	24.4 (75.9)	20.8 (69.4)	15.1 (59.2)	9.1 (48.4)	4.0 (39.2)	12.9 (55.2)
Mean daily minimum °C (°F)	−3.4 (25.9)	−2.7 (27.1)	0.2 (32.4)	5.5 (41.9)	11.4 (52.5)	15.9 (60.6)	19.9 (67.8)	20.7 (69.3)	16.8 (62.2)	10.4 (50.7)	3.6 (38.5)	−1.2 (29.8)	8.1 (46.6)
Record low °C (°F)	−16.4 (2.5)	−11.9 (10.6)	−9.5 (14.9)	−5.5 (22.1)	2.0 (35.6)	7.7 (45.9)	9.0 (48.2)	12.2 (54.0)	6.2 (43.2)	0.1 (32.2)	−5.9 (21.4)	−8.9 (16.0)	−16.4 (2.5)
Average precipitation mm (inches)	34.9 (1.37)	34.8 (1.37)	84.0 (3.31)	108.3 (4.26)	139.4 (5.49)	172.4 (6.79)	235.8 (9.28)	235.7 (9.28)	209.6 (8.25)	160.5 (6.32)	71.0 (2.80)	39.5 (1.56)	1,522.6 (59.94)
Average precipitation days (≥ 1.0 mm)	4.3	4.8	8.2	10.0	11.3	14.3	15.7	13.4	12.7	10.1	6.7	4.5	116
Mean monthly sunshine hours	193.5	185.5	194.1	189.1	183.2	129.6	128.5	148.0	120.3	139.9	161.5	180.3	1,953.4
Source: Japan Meteorological Agency

=== Demographics ===
Per Japanese census data, the population of Ōtawara has remained relatively steady over the past 70 years.

Historical population
Year	Pop.	±%
1920	20,064	—
1930	22,216	+10.7%
1940	23,069	+3.8%
1950	77,363	+235.4%
1960	71,806	−7.2%
1970	65,232	−9.2%
1980	71,276	+9.3%
1990	76,406	+7.2%
2000	78,993	+3.4%
2010	77,707	−1.6%
2020	72,087	−7.2%

== History ==
During the Sengoku period, the area was controlled by the Ōtawara clan, who built Ōtawara Castle in 1545. The surrounding jōkamachi was a shukuba on the Ōshū Kaidō highway to northern Japan. During the Edo Period, Ōtawara Domain under the Tokugawa shogunate lasted for over 250 years until the Meiji period. Kurobane Domain was another feudal domain which existed within the borders of modern Ōtawara during this time. With the creation of the modern municipality system on April 1, 1889, the town of Ōtawara was created. On December 1, 1954, the town of Ōtawara and the villages of Chikasono and Kaneda combined to form the city of Ōtawara. The city annexed part of Nozaki Town on December 31, 1954 followed by part of Nishinasuno Town on April 1, 1955 and the town of Sakuyama on November 5, 1955.

On October 1, 2005, the town of Kurobane, and the village of Yuzukami (both from Nasu District) were merged into Ōtawara.

== Government ==
Ōtawara has a mayor-council form of government with a directly elected mayor and a unicameral town council of 21 members. Ōtawara contributes two members to the Tochigi Prefectural Assembly. In terms of national politics, the town is part of Tochigi 3rd district of the lower house of the Diet of Japan.

== Economy ==
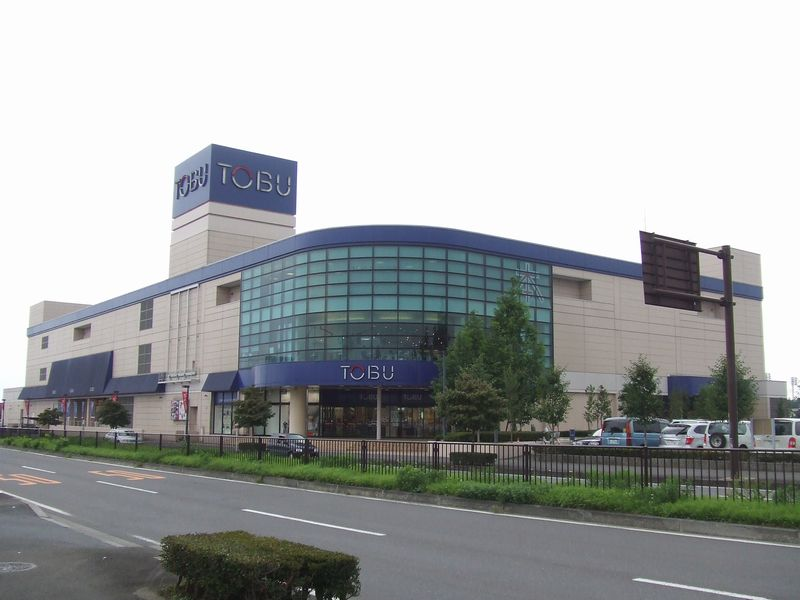
Tōbu department store

Ōtawara is one of the largest rice producing areas in Tochigi. The city is also home to four industrial parks, and industries include corporations such as Canon Medical Systems Corporation which sells medical imaging equipment worldwide including CT scans, and Mochida Pharmaceutical Co. Ltd. which specializes in the sales of pharmaceuticals, medical equipment and skincare products. Tochigi Nikon Corporation, a member of the Nikon Group that designs and manufactures optical products, electronic imaging equipment, semiconductor manufacturing equipment and optical lenses, is also located in Ōtawara.

== Education ==
Ōtawara has 20 public elementary schools eight public junior high schools operated by the city government, and four public high schools operated by the Tochigi Prefectural Board of Education. The International University of Health and Welfare is located in Ōtawara. The university was established in 1995, with the aim of training experts in the field of health and welfare.

== Transportation ==
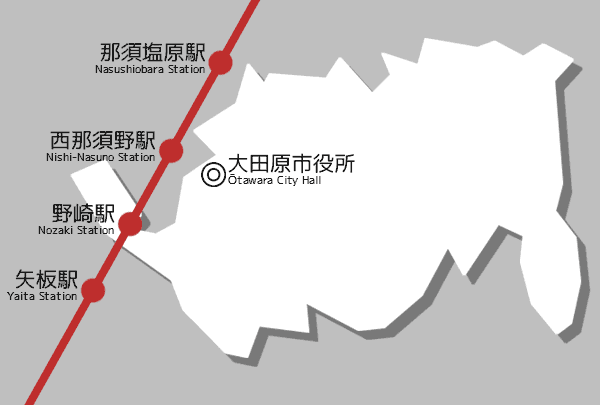
Railway stations

=== Railway ===
JR East – Tohoku Main Line (Utsunomiya Line)

- Nozaki

=== Highway ===
- Tōhoku Expressway – Nishinasuno-Shiobara IC
- National Route 294
- National Route 400
- National Route 461

== Local attractions ==
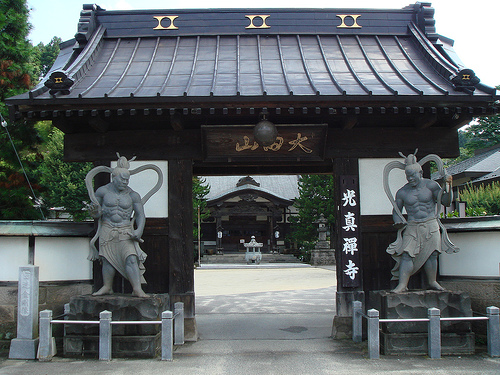
Entrance to Kōshin-ji in Ōtawara.

Ōtawara is home to several historical and cultural assets:

- Kasaishi Shrine (笠石神社) dating to the 690s AD has one of the oldest surviving examples of writing in Japan
- site of Kurobane Castle
- Kurobane Onsen
- Nakagawa Aquatic Park
- Nasunogahara Harmony Hall
- site of Ōtawara Castle
- Ōtawara Onsen
- Shino Kura Hall is a thatched roof style building dating to approximately the late 1850s or early 1860s, the end of the Edo period. The Hall displays old equipment and other artifacts dating to that time period such as large carts, a foot threshing machine, a packsaddle, and a milk machine. The Hall also serves handmade soba noodles using home-grown buckwheat.
- Unganji (雲巌寺), a Buddhist temple in the east side of Ōtawara, is a location where Matsuo Bashō stopped during the journey recorded in The Narrow Road to the Deep North (Oku no Hosomichi). A stone engraved with a haiku he wrote inspired by what he saw there is displayed.
- Yamato Daijingū (皇和大親宮), the headquarters of Kanrodai Reiri Shidōkai

== Sports and recreation ==
The largest sporting event the city hosts is the Tabara Hiroshi Marathon which is held annually on November 23, Labor Day. There are ten golf courses in the Ōtawara area, including both public courses and private country clubs such the New St. Andrews Golf Club which is a Jack Nicklaus design course. Ōtawara has a large sports and recreation complex called the Tochigi Prefectural North Gymnasium. The gymnasium has a main arena for general sports and cultural events and includes two basketball and three volleyball courts, 10 badminton courts, 20 ping-pong tables, one handball court, 10 tennis courts, two wrestling and karate rings. The arena can seat up to 1,500 spectators. In addition, there is a separate smaller arena, martial arts area, and training rooms. Several other gymnasiums, community pools, and sports fields are located throughout the Ōtawara area.

== International relations ==
- St Andrews, Scotland, United Kingdom
- West Covina, California, United States

== Notable people ==
- Masakazu Fukuda, professional wrestler
- Hokutōriki Hideki, sumo wrestler
- Hikaru Midorikawa, voice actor
- Yumiko Ōshima, cartoonist
- Nasu Sukeharu, Muromachi-era daimyō
- Kazue Takahashi, voice actress
- Hirobumi Watanabe, movie director
- Michio Watanabe, politician
