= Ōtawara Castle =

Coordinates: 36°52′6.05″N 140°02′4.55″E

Ōtawara Castle 大田原城
- Ōtawara, Tochigi Prefecture, Japan
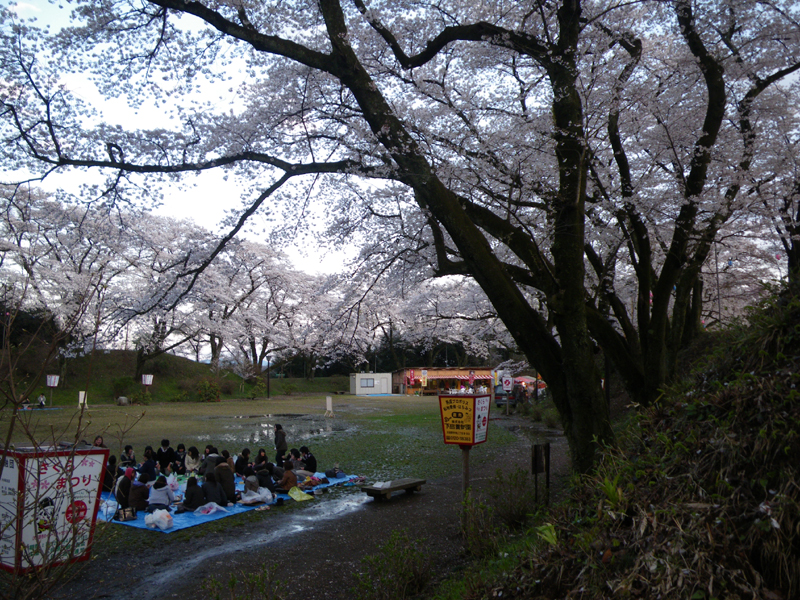
- Ōtawara Castle grounds in spring

Site information
- Type: hirayama-style Japanese castle
- Open to the public: yes

Location

Site history
- Built: 1545
- Built by: Ōtawara Sukekiyo
- In use: Edo period
- Demolished: 1871

Ōtawara Castle (大田原城, Ōtawara -jō) is a Japanese castle located in Ōtawara, southern Tochigi Prefecture, Japan. Throughout the Edo period, Ōtawara Castle was home to a branch of the Ōtawara clan, daimyō of Ōtawara Domain. It was also called the "Dragon Castle" (龍城, Ryū-jō)

== History ==
The Ōtawara clan was a branch of the Nasu clan, and was one of the seven Gōzoku samurai bands of the Nasu region of northern Shimotsuke Province. In 1590, Ōtawara Harukiyo went against his Nasu overlord and pledged allegiance to Toyotomi Hideyoshi at the Battle of Odawara against the Odawara Hōjō clan, and was awarded a 7,000 koku holding. He later pledged his forces to Tokugawa Ieyasu and fought a rear-guard action against the Uesugi clan while Ieyasu was at the Battle of Sekigahara and gained another 5,000 koku, which qualified him to the ranks of the daimyō.

Ōtawara Castle was built by Ōtawara Harukiyo's grandfather, Ōtawara Sukekiyo, in 1545 on a 25-meter high hill overlooking the Sabigawa River. The main gate of the castle faced west, and fronted on the Ōshū Kaidō, the main highway linking Edo with the northern provinces of Japan. The castle consisted of a northern kuruwa, followed by the main bailey, second bailey and third bailey.

During the Boshin War, Ōtawara sided with the Imperial cause. The castle came under attack by the pro-Shogunal forces of Aizu Domain in May 1868, and the structures of its third bailey were destroyed.

Following the establishment of the Meiji government, the remaining castle structures were destroyed in 1871. At present, the site of the castle is a public park.

== Literature ==
- Schmorleitz, Morton S. (1974). Castles in Japan. Tokyo: Charles E. Tuttle Co. pp. 144–145. ISBN 0-8048-1102-4.
- Motoo, Hinago (1986). Japanese Castles. Tokyo: Kodansha. p. 200 pages. ISBN 0-87011-766-1.
- Mitchelhill, Jennifer (2004). Castles of the Samurai: Power and Beauty. Tokyo: Kodansha. p. 112 pages. ISBN 4-7700-2954-3.
- Turnbull, Stephen (2003). Japanese Castles 1540-1640. Osprey Publishing. p. 64 pages. ISBN 1-84176-429-9.
