= Ōtawara Kazukiyo =

Japanese politician

Viscount Ōtawara Kazukiyo
- 大田原 一清
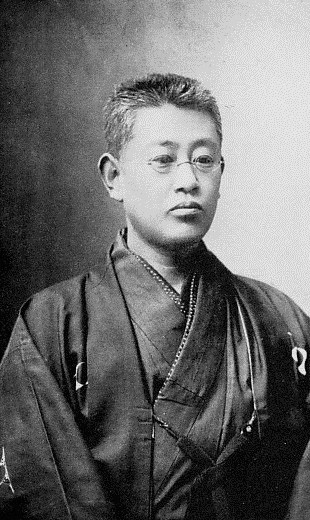

Member of the House of Peers
- In office 28 July 1899 – 9 July 1918 Elected by the Viscounts

Governor of Ōtawara Domain
- In office June 1869 – 15 July 1871
- Monarch: Meiji
- Preceded by: Himself (as Daimyō of Ōtawara)
- Succeeded by: Position abolished

Daimyō of Ōtawara Domain
- In office 1862–1869
- Shōgun: Tokugawa Iemochi; Tokugawa Yoshinobu
- Preceded by: Ōtawara Tomikiyo
- Succeeded by: Himself (as Governor of Ōtawara)

Personal details
- Born: 10 November 1861
- Died: 28 October 1930 (aged 69)
- Spouse(s): Iyoko, daughter of Mori Yoshishige
- Parent: Ōtawara Tomikiyo (father)

Viscount Ōtawara Kazukiyo (大田原一清; 10 November 1861 – 28 October 1930) was the 14th (and final) daimyō of Ōtawara Domain in Shimotsuke Province, Japan (modern-day Tochigi Prefecture) under the Bakumatsu period Tokugawa shogunate. His courtesy title was Hida-no-kami, and his Court rank was Junior Fifth Rank, Lower Grade, later raised to Upper Fifth Rank.

== Biography ==
Ōtawara Kazukiyo was the eldest son of Ōtawara Tomikiyo, the 13th daimyō of Ōtawara. He became daimyō in 1862 on his father's death. In 1868, with the start of the Boshin War, he immediate pledged fealty to the new Meiji government and was awarded with reconfirmation in his holdings. In 1869 he was appointed imperial governor of Ōtawara, although the government also demanded 5000 ryō in gold to help pay for the costs of the Boshin War. With the abolition of the han system in July 1871, he retired and relocated to Tokyo, where he attended the Keio Gijuku university.

With the establishment of the kazoku peerage system he was awarded with the title of shishaku (viscount) in 1884. In 1899, he was appointed to a seat in the House of Peers, where he served until 1918. He died in 1930.

== See also ==
- Ōtawara Domain
