= Nakagawa Aquatic Park =

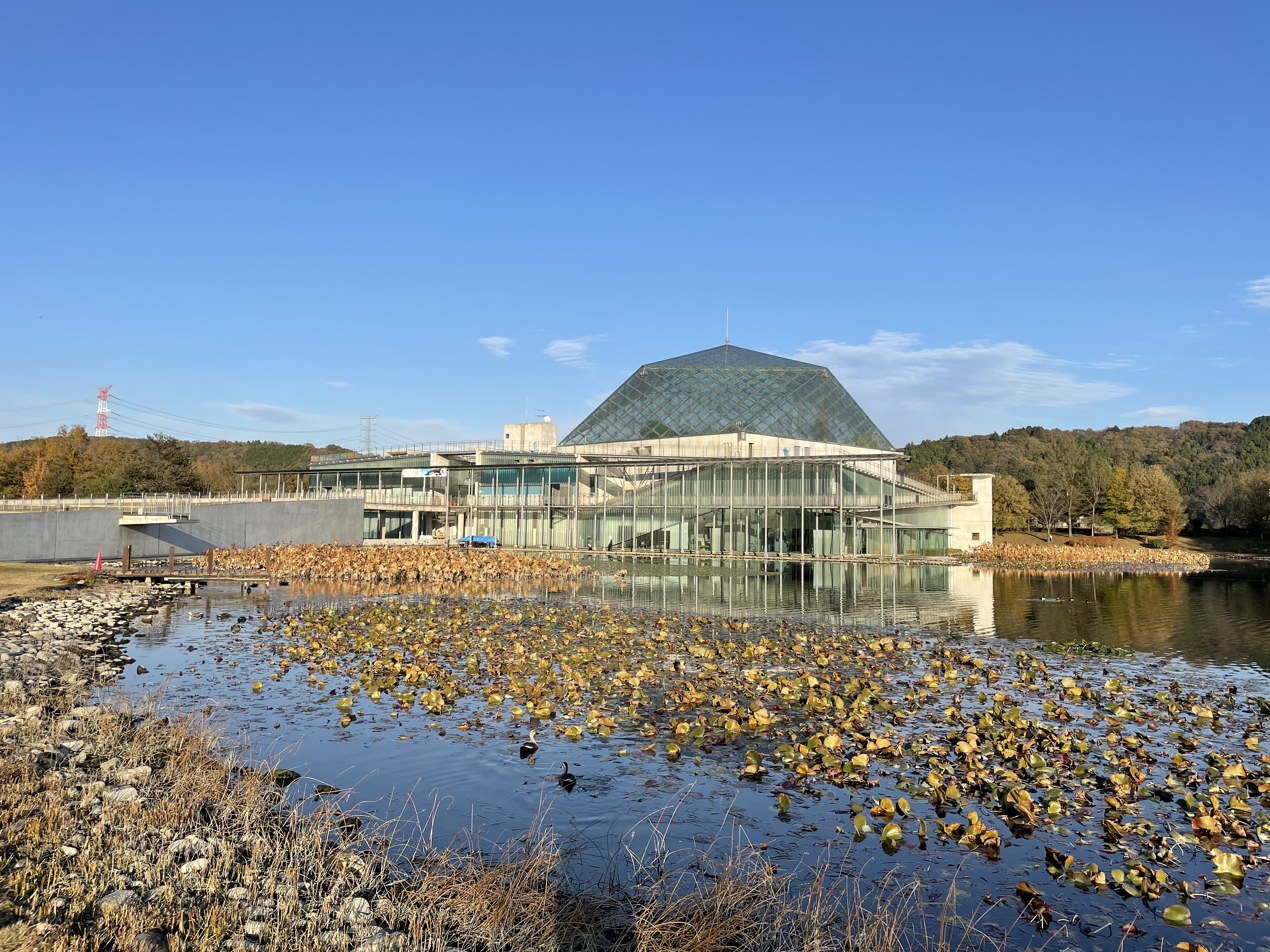
- Nakagawa Aquatic Park and Naka River
- Interactive map of Nakagawa Aquatic Park
- 36°47′26″N 140°7′42″E
- Date opened: July 2001
- Location: Otawara, Tochigi Prefecture, Japan
- Land area: 7,008 m^{2} (75,430 sq ft)
- No. of animals: 20,000
- No. of species: 300
- Volume of largest tank: 400,000 litres (106,000 US gal)
- Total volume of tanks: 600,000 litres (159,000 US gal)
- Memberships: JAZA
- Website: tnap.jp/english/index.php

Nakagawa Aquatic Park (栃木県なかがわ水遊園, Tochigi ken Nakagawa suiyu en) is an aquarium attached to the Tochigi Prefectural Fisheries Experiment Station, located on the banks of the Naka River in Sarado, Otawara, Tochigi Prefecture, Japan. Although saltwater fish are also kept here, the public aquarium is mainly for freshwater fish. The aquarium opened on July 15, 2001. The aquarium is accredited as a Museum-equivalent facilities by the Museum Act from Ministry of Education, Culture, Sports, Science and Technology.

== Exhibits ==
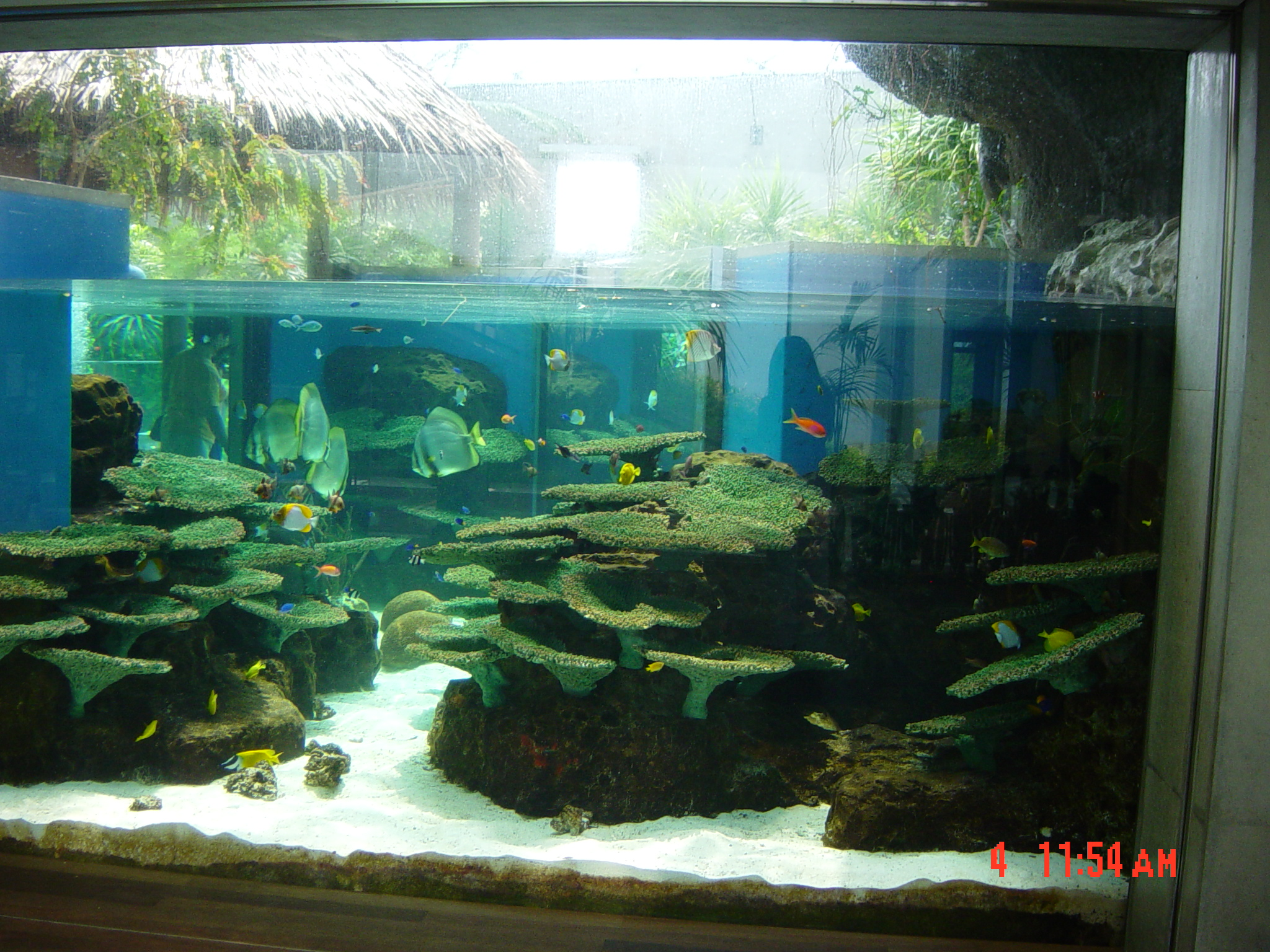
Coral reef tank

Located on the banks of the Naka River and the Broom River, two of the Kanto region's representative clear streams where sweetfish run upstream, it has an "Omoshiro sakana museum" that exhibits a variety of fish, a park, an observation deck, a fish encounter station, and other facilities.

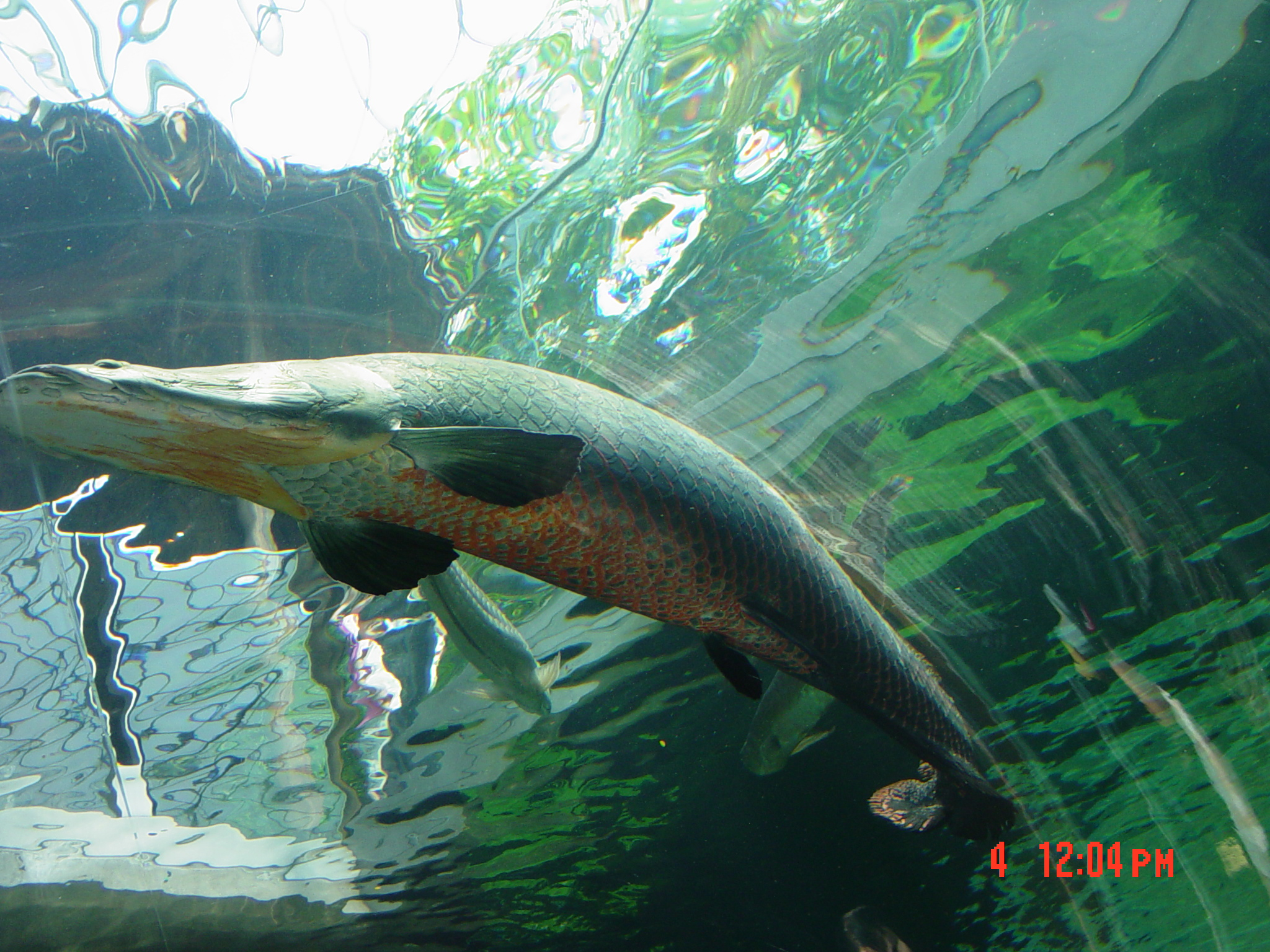
Amazon River tank. The 400,000 litres (106,000 US gal) freshwater tunnel tank is one of the largest in Japan, along with the Lake Biwa Museum.

The aquarium displaying tropical fish from the Amazon River tank is the one of Japan's largest tank dedicated to freshwater fish. Other exhibits include freshwater fish exhibits for each basin of the Naka River, which simulate the upstream and downstream areas of the river, various Japanese freshwater fish, tropical saltwater fish, an aquarium where visitors can touch and feel the fish, and an exhibition area for rare Japanese fish.
