= Ōtawara Domain =

Feudal domain in Edo period Japan

Ōtawara Domain 大田原藩
- under Tokugawa shogunate Japan
- 1600–1871
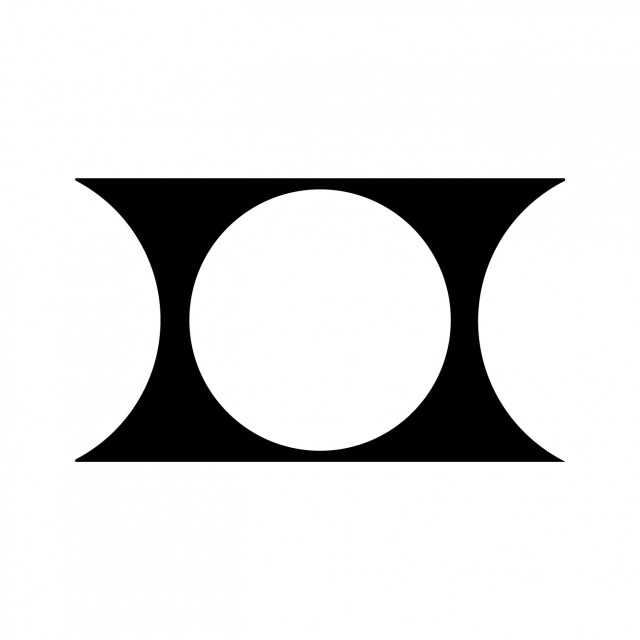
- Mon of the Ōtawara clan
- Capital: Ōtawara Castle
  - Type: Daimyō
- Historical era: Edo period
  - Established: 1600
  - Disestablished: 1871
- Today part of: part of Tochigi Prefecture

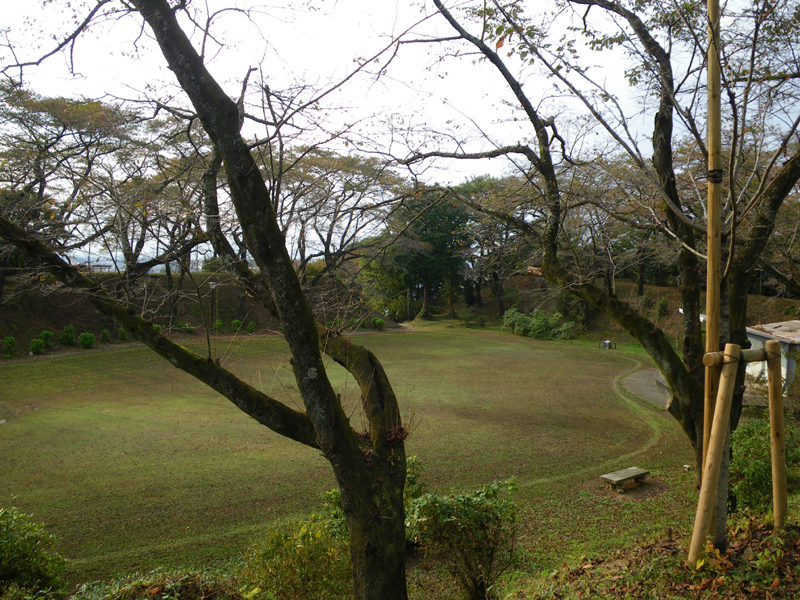
ruins of Ōtawara Castle

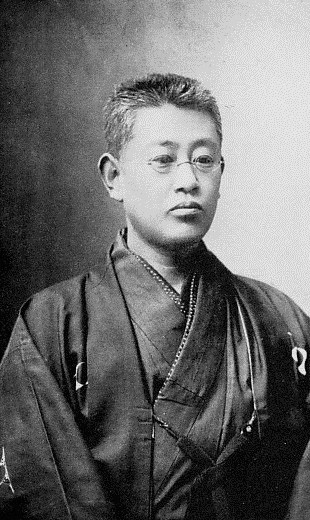
Ōtawara Kazukiyo, final daimyo of Ōtawara Domain

Ōtawara Domain (大田原藩, Ōtawara-han) was a feudal domain under the Tokugawa shogunate of Edo period Japan, located in Shimotsuke Province (modern-day Tochigi Prefecture), Japan. It was centered on Ōtawara Castle in what is now part of the city of Ōtawara, Tochigi. Ōtawara was ruled through all of its history by the Ōtawara clan.

== History ==
The Ōtawara clan was a branch of the Nasu clan, and was one of the seven Gōzoku samurai bands of the Nasu region of northern Shimotsuke Province. In 1590, when Toyotomi Hideyoshi called upon the Nasu clan to assist in his plan to destroy the Hōjō clan at the Battle of Odawara, the Nasu refused his summons; however, Ōtawara Harukiyo went against his overlord and pledged allegiance to Hideyoshi. In return, he was awarded a 7,000 koku holding. In 1600, Ōtawara Harukiyo pledged his forces to Tokugawa Ieyasu and fought a rear-guard action against the Uesugi clan while Ieyasu was at the Battle of Sekigahara. In return for this action, he was awarded another 5,000 koku and was thus admitted into the ranks of the daimyō.

The Ōtawara continued to rule these holdings until the end of the Tokugawa Shogunate. The 3rd daimyō, Ōtawara Takakiyo, gave 1,000 koku to his younger brother, reducing the domain to 11,000 koku. During the Bakumatsu period, the 12th daimyō, Ōtawara Hirokiyo, established a domain academy. The final daimyō, Ōtawara Kazukiyo sided with the imperial forces in the Boshin War, and his castle attacked by pro-Tokugawa Aizu Domain in May 1868. After the Meiji restoration, he was made a viscount (shishaku) in the kazoku peerage system. After the abolition of the han system in July 1871, Ōtawara Domain became part of Tochigi Prefecture.

The domain had a population of 12,535 people in 2397 households, of which 608 were samurai per a census in 1870.

== Holdings at the end of the Edo period ==
As with most domains in the han system, Ōtawara Domain consisted of several discontinuous territories calculated to provide the assigned kokudaka, based on periodic cadastral surveys and projected agricultural yields.

- Shimotsuke Province
  - 1 villages in Tsuga District
  - 7 villages in Haga District
  - 58 villages in Nasu District
  - 13 villages in Shioya District

== List of daimyō ==
#	Name	Tenure	Courtesy title	Court Rank	kokudaka
Ōtawara clan (tozama) 1600–1871
1	Ōtawara Harukiyo (大田原晴清)	1842–1858	Bizen-no-kami (備前守)	Junior 5th Rank, Lower Grade (従五位下)	12,000 koku
2	Ōtawara Masakiyo (大田原政清)	1858–1871	Bizen-no-kami (備前守)	Junior 5th Rank, Lower Grade (従五位下)	12,000 koku
3	Ōtawara Takakiyo (大田原高清)	1842–1858	Yamashiro-no-kami (山城守)	Junior 5th Rank, Lower Grade (従五位下)	12,000 ->11,000 koku
4	Ōtawara Norikiyo (大田原典清)	1858–1871	Bizen-no-kami (備前守)	Junior 5th Rank, Lower Grade (従五位下)	11,000 koku
5	Ōtawara Sumikiyo (大田原純清)	1858–1871	Izumi-no-kami (泉守)	Junior 5th Rank, Lower Grade (従五位下)	11,000 koku
6	Ōtawara Kiyonobu (大田原清信)	1842–1858	Bizen-no-kami (備前守)	Junior 5th Rank, Lower Grade (従五位下)	11,000 koku
7	Ōtawara Sukekiyo (大田原扶清)	1858–1871	Hida-no-kami (飛騨守)	Junior 5th Rank, Lower Grade (従五位下)	11,000 koku
8	Ōtawara Tomokiyo (大田原友清)	1858–1871	Izumo-no-kami (出雲守)	Junior 5th Rank, Lower Grade (従五位下)	11,000 koku
9	Ōtawara Tsunekiyo (大田原庸清)	1858–1871	Yamashiro-no-kami (山城守)	Junior 5th Rank, Lower Grade (従五位下)	11,000 koku
10	Ōtawara Mitsukiyo (大田原光清)	1842–1858	Yamashiro-no-kami (山城守)	Junior 5th Rank, Lower Grade (従五位下)	11,000 koku
11	Ōtawara Yoshikiyo (大田原愛清)	1858–1871	Hida-no-kami (飛騨守)	Junior 5th Rank, Lower Grade (従五位下)	11,000 koku
12	Ōtawara Hirokiyo (大田原広清)	1858–1871	Izumo-no-kami (出雲守)	Junior 5th Rank, Lower Grade (従五位下)	11,000 koku
13	Ōtawara Tomikiyo (大田原富清)	1858–1871	Hida-no-kami (飛騨守)	Junior 5th Rank, Lower Grade (従五位下)	11,000 koku
14	Ōtawara Kazukiyo (大田原一清)	1858–1871	Hida-no-kami (飛騨守)	Junior 5th Rank, Lower Grade (従五位下)	11,000 koku
