= Nasu Sukeharu =

Japanese daimyō

Nasu Sukeharu (那須資晴, 1557 – August 7, 1610) was a Japanese daimyō of the Koji era of the Muromachi period.

He was born in 1557 as the son of Suketane Nasu, the 20th head of the Nasu clan. In 1578, he fought with his father at the Battle of Ogawadai.
