= Tochigi Prefecture =

Prefecture of Japan

Tochigi Prefecture 栃木県
- Prefecture

Japanese transcription(s)
  - Japanese: 栃木県
  - Rōmaji: Tochigi-ken
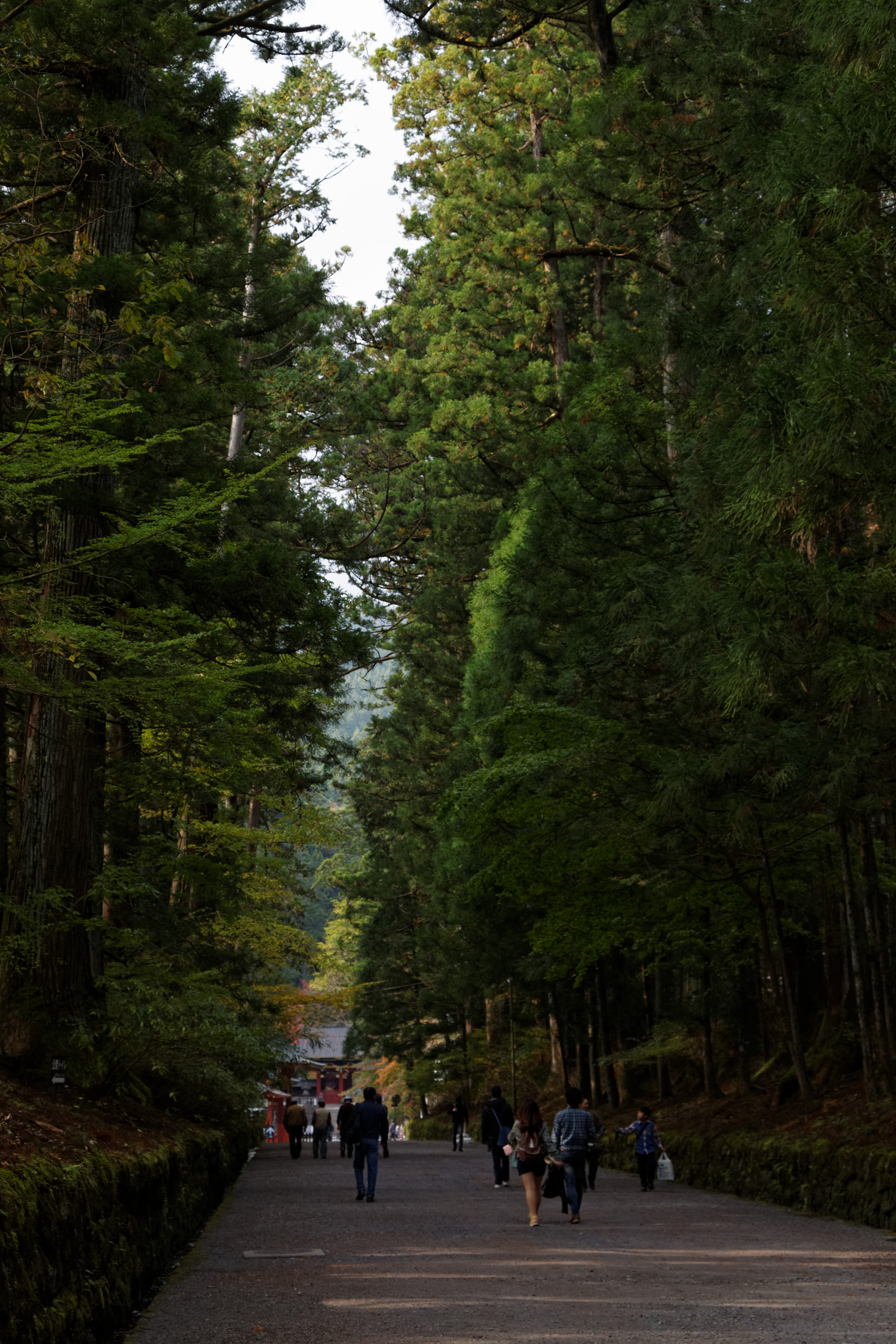
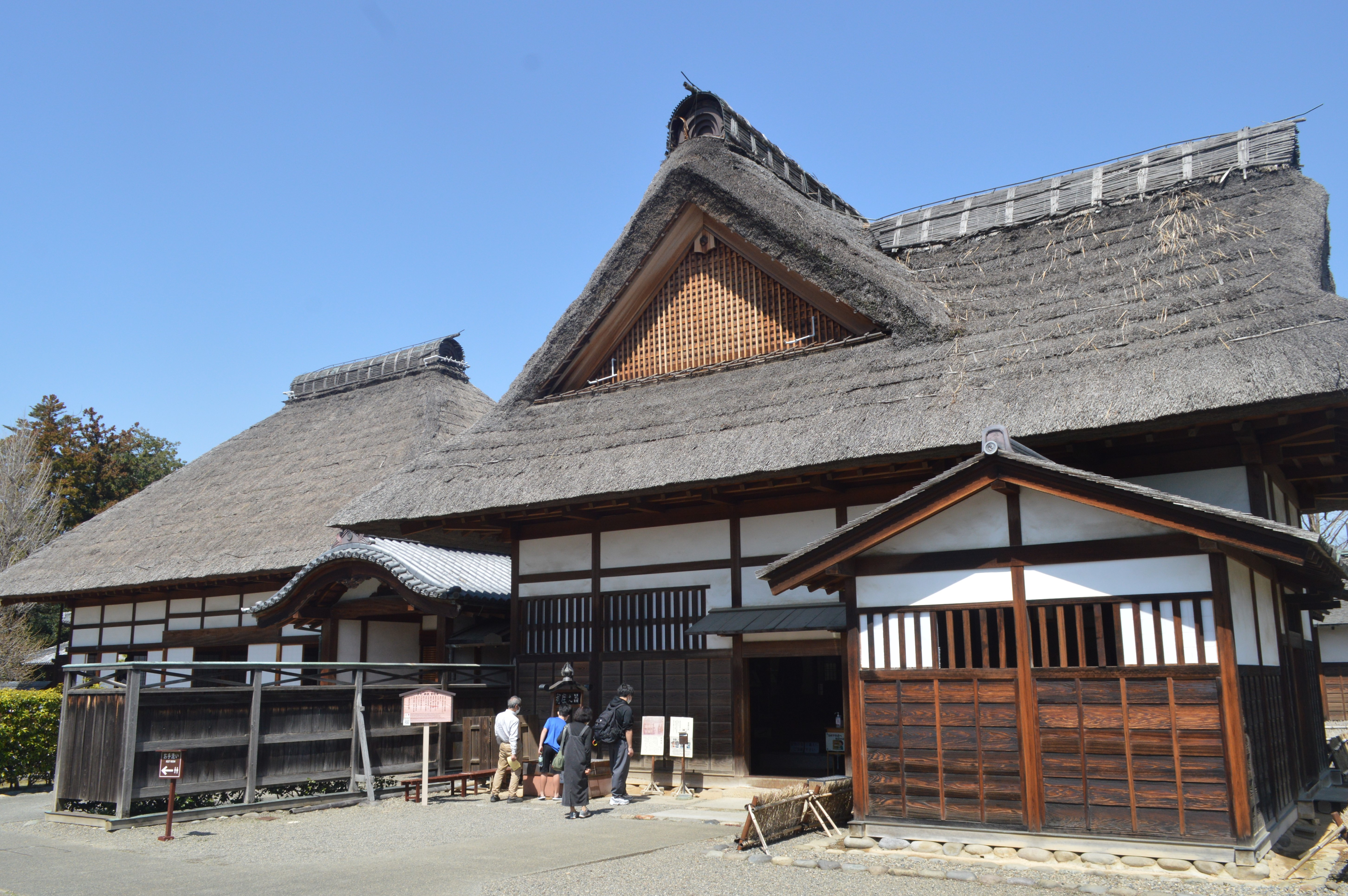
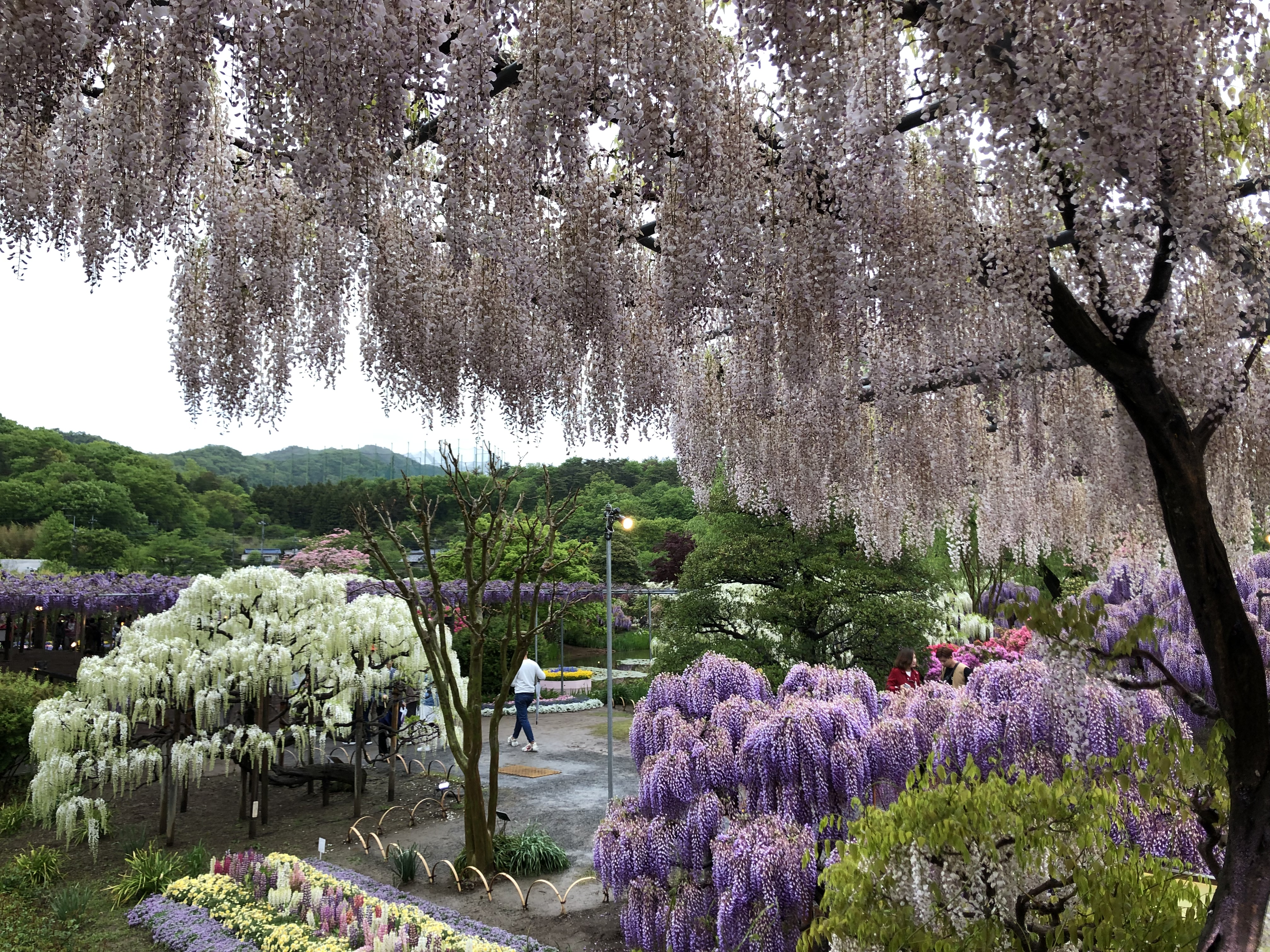
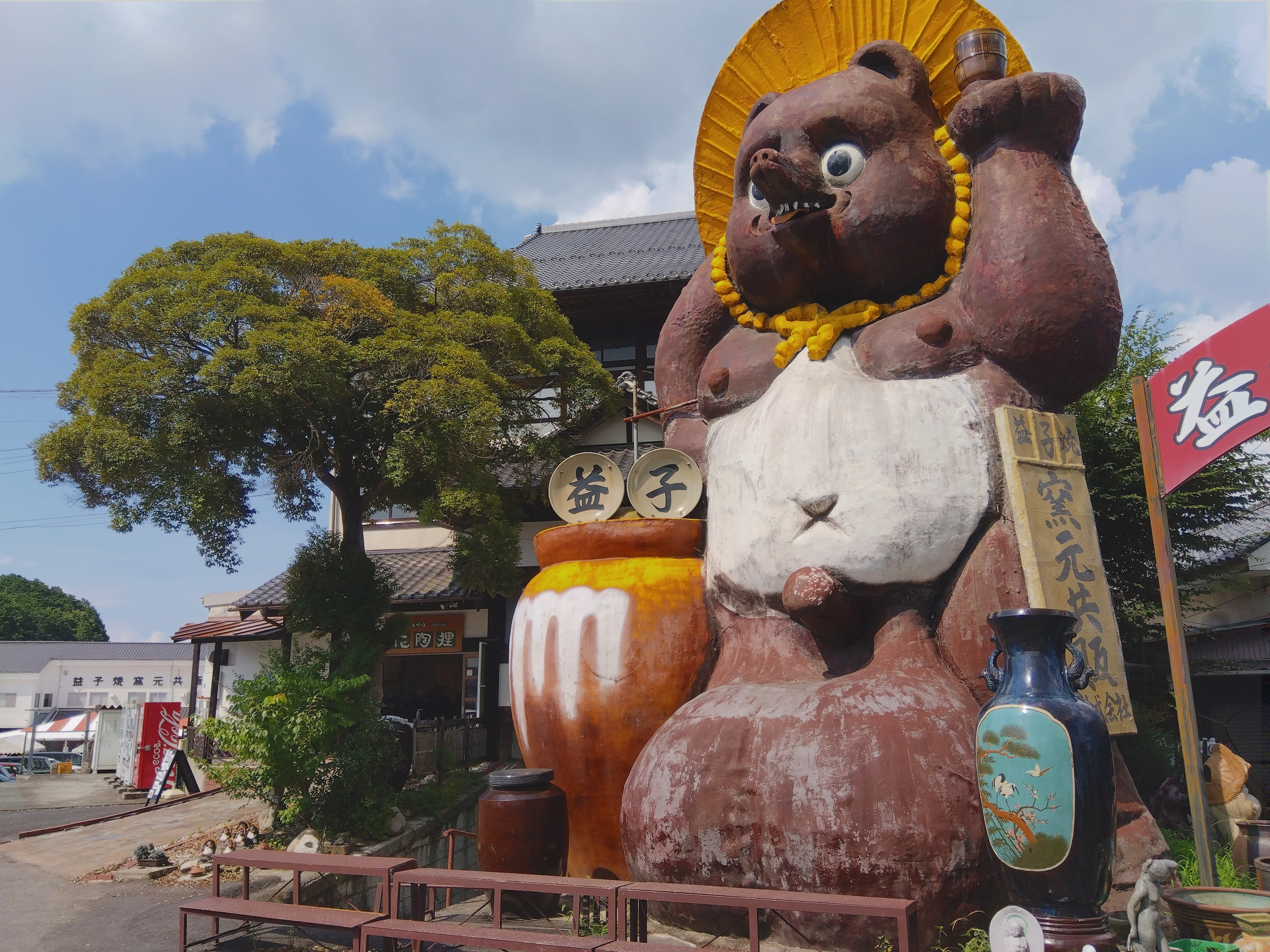
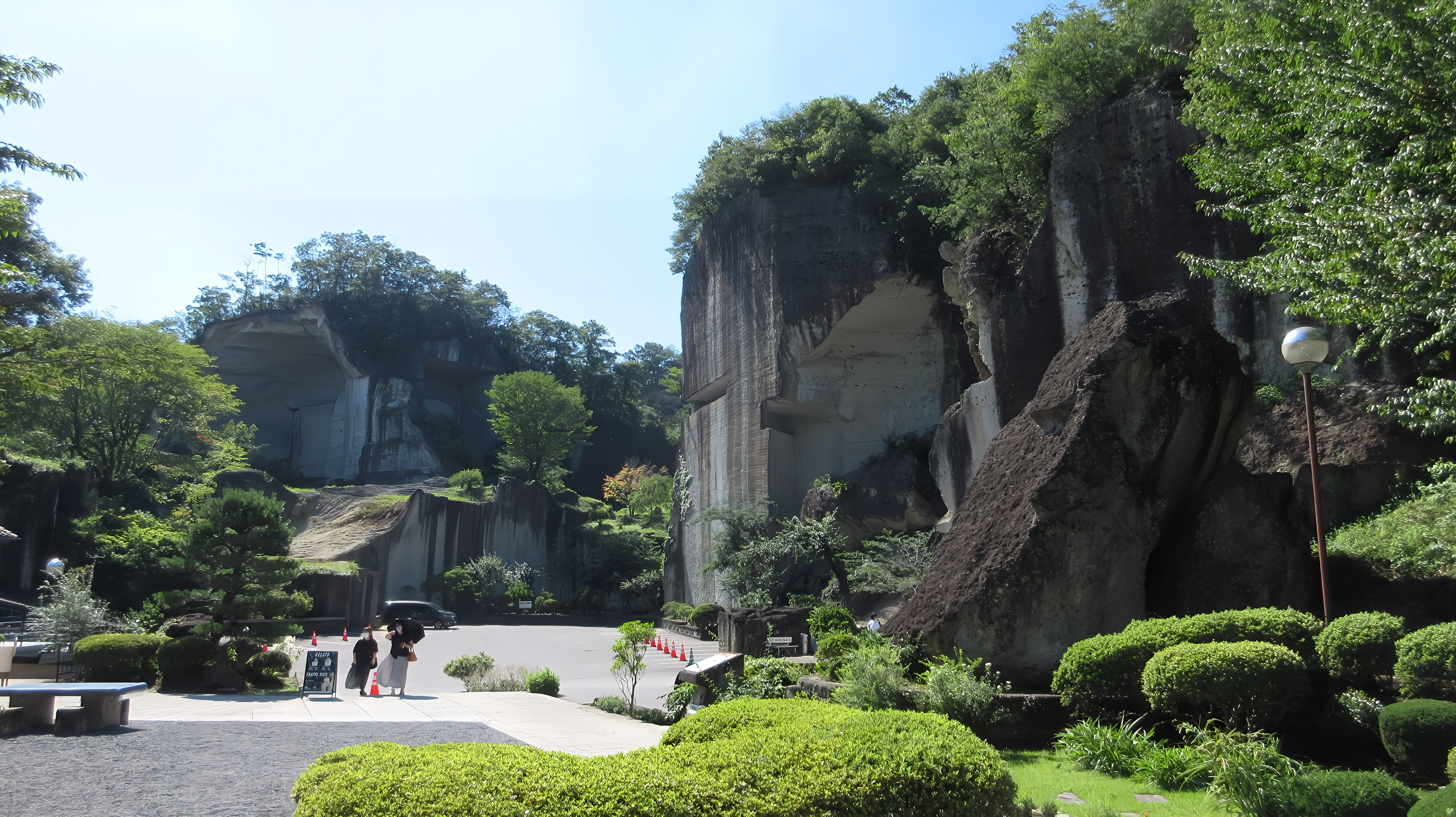
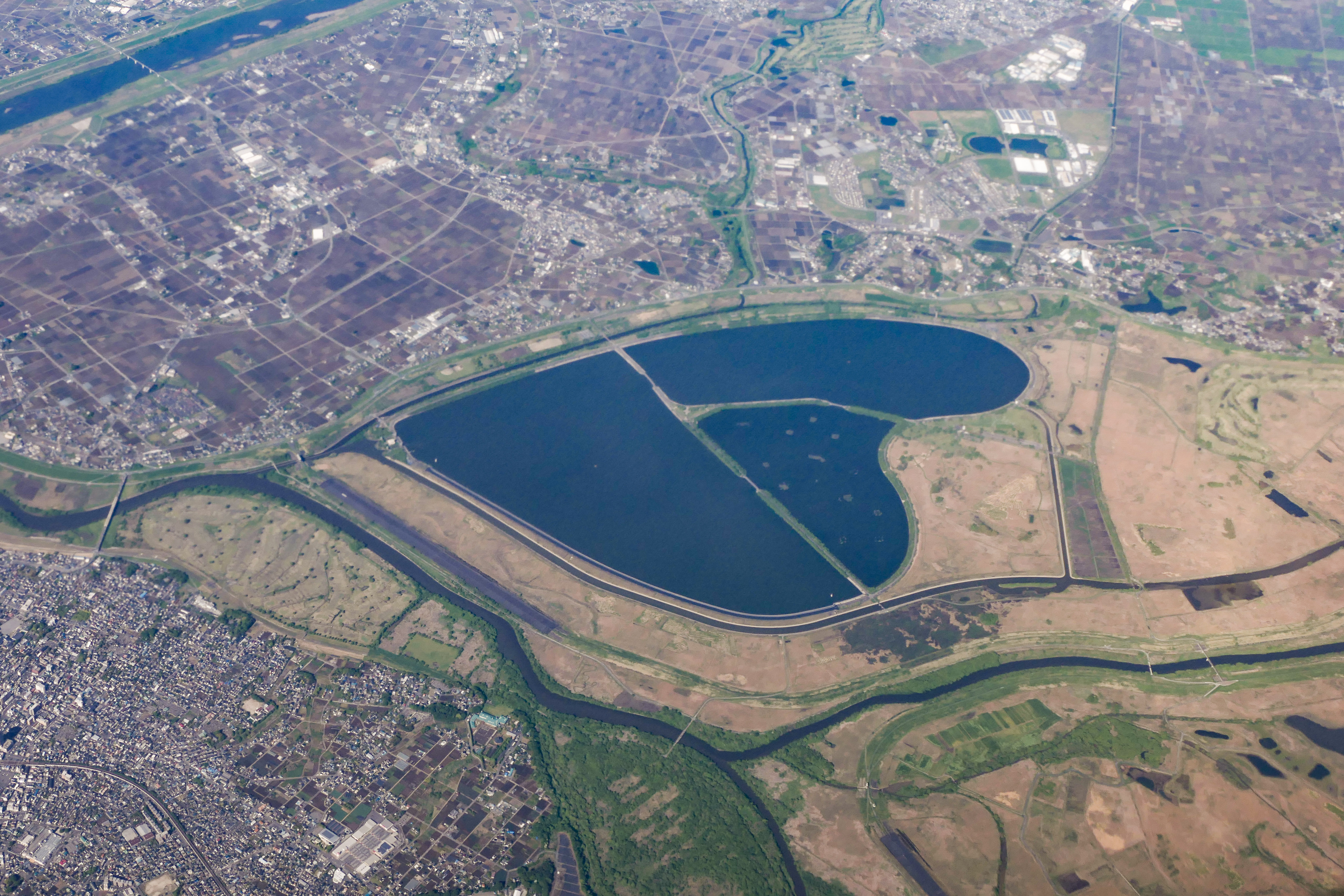
- Nikkō Tōshō-gū Lake Chūzenji Cedar Avenue of Nikkō Kegon Falls Ashikaga Gakkō Ashikaga Flower Park Mashiko Pottery Center Ōya Stone Museum Watarase Reservoir

- Flag Emblem
- Anthem: Kenmin no Uta
- Coordinates: 36°31′N 139°49′E
- Country: Japan
- Region: Kantō
- Island: Honshu
- Capital: Utsunomiya
- Subdivisions: Districts: 5, Municipalities: 25

Government
  - Governor: Tomikazu Fukuda

Area
  - Total: 6,408.09 km^{2} (2,474.18 sq mi)
  - Rank: 20th

Population (June 1, 2023)
  - Total: 1,897,649
  - Rank: 19th
  - Density: 296.133/km^{2} (766.982/sq mi)
  - Dialects: Tochigi ・Ashikaga

GDP
  - Total: JP¥9,596 billion US$70.8 billion (2022)
- ISO 3166 code: JP-09
- Website: www.pref.tochigi.lg.jp
- Symbols of Japan
- Bird: Blue-and-white flycatcher (Cyanoptila cyanomelana)
- Flower: Yashio tsutsuji (Rhododendron albrechtii)
- Tree: Japanese horse chestnut (Aesculus turbinata)

Tochigi Prefecture (栃木県, Tochigi-ken (Note: Japanese pronunciation: [tó̞.c̟͡ɕì.ɡ̟ʲì, -ŋ̟ʲì, tò̞.c̟͡ɕí.ɡ̟ʲí(.kè̞ɴ), -ŋ̟ʲí(.ɕì)], locally [tò̞.c̟͡ɕí.ŋ̟ʲí])) is an inland prefecture of Japan located in the Kantō region of Honshu. Tochigi Prefecture has a population of 1,897,649 (1 June 2023) and has a geographic area of 6,408 km^{2} (2,474 sq mi). Tochigi Prefecture borders Fukushima Prefecture to the north, Gunma Prefecture to the west, Saitama Prefecture to the south, and Ibaraki Prefecture to the southeast.

Utsunomiya is the capital and largest city of Tochigi Prefecture, with other major cities including Oyama, Tochigi, and Ashikaga. Tochigi Prefecture is one of only eight inland prefectures and its mountainous northern region is a popular tourist region in Japan. The Nasu area is known for its onsens, local sake, and ski resorts, the villa of the Imperial Family, and the Nasushiobara station of the Shinkansen railway line. The city of Nikkō, with its ancient Shintō shrines and Buddhist temples, is a UNESCO World Heritage Site.

Current map of Tochigi Prefecture City Town

== Prefectural overview ==
Situated among the inland prefectures of the northern part of the Kantō region, Tochigi is contiguous with Ibaraki, Gunma, Saitama, and Fukushima Prefectures.

The climate of Tochigi may be classified as a humid temperate zone with broad variations in temperature. Winters are arid with dry winds, while summers are humid with frequent thunderstorms.

The population of Tochigi as of November 2010 is approximately 2,005,096.

Located in the center of the prefecture is the largest open plain in the Kantō region. Shirane (2,578 metres (8,458 ft)), Nantai (2,484 metres (8,150 ft)) and Nasudake (1,917 metres (6,289 ft)) mountain are in the northern part of the area. Kinugawa, Nakagawa, and Watarase River originate in this region, which flow across the Kanto plain before emptying into the Pacific Ocean. Tochigi is the 20th largest prefecture in Japan with a total area of 6,408.09 square km.

As of 1 April 2012, 21% of the total land area of the prefecture was designated as Natural Parks, namely Nikkō National Park, Oze National Park, and eight Prefectural Natural Parks.

== History ==
Before the Meiji Restoration, Tochigi was known as Shimotsuke Province.

In the early 15th century, the Ashikaga Gakkō, Japan's oldest school of higher education, was re-established in the prefecture, holding over 3,000 students by the 16th century. Saint Francis Xavier introduced Ashikaga to the world as the best university in Japan.

In the early 17th century, Japan was unified under the shōgun Tokugawa Ieyasu. After his death, the Nikko Tōshō-gū shrine was built in Nikkō in 1617 on what the shōguns thought of as holy ground to protect and worship Ieyasu. Its establishment brought Nikkō to national attention. Ieyasu's successors as Tokugawa shogun developed the Nikkō Kaidō (日光街道, part of the major road connecting Nikkō with Edo) and acquired lavish processions to worship Ieyasu.

In the late 19th century, the Tokugawa shogunate fell and the new government established the prefectures. The prefectural capital was established in the city of Tochigi after the unification of Utsunomiya Prefecture and Tochigi Prefecture in 1873. By 1884, however, the capital was transferred to Utsunomiya.

In March 2011, following the Fukushima Daiichi nuclear disaster, levels of radioactivity in Utsunomiya were 33 times higher than normal.

== Geography ==
The chief city of Utsunomiya is famous for its many gyoza specialist shops. Also located in Utsunomiya, Tochigi Prefecture has one of the largest shopping malls in the North Kantō region, Bell Mall.

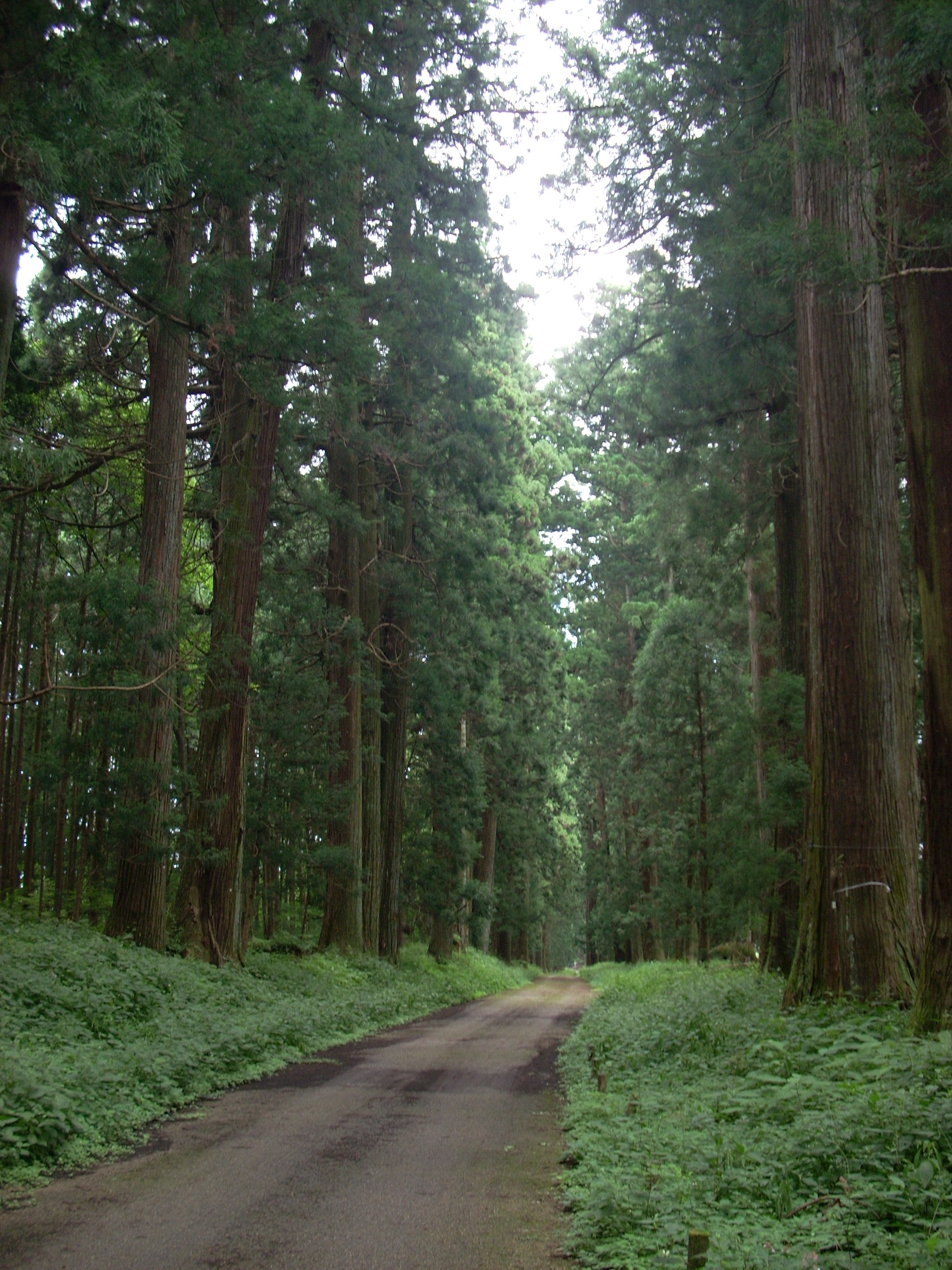
Nikkō Cedar Avenue

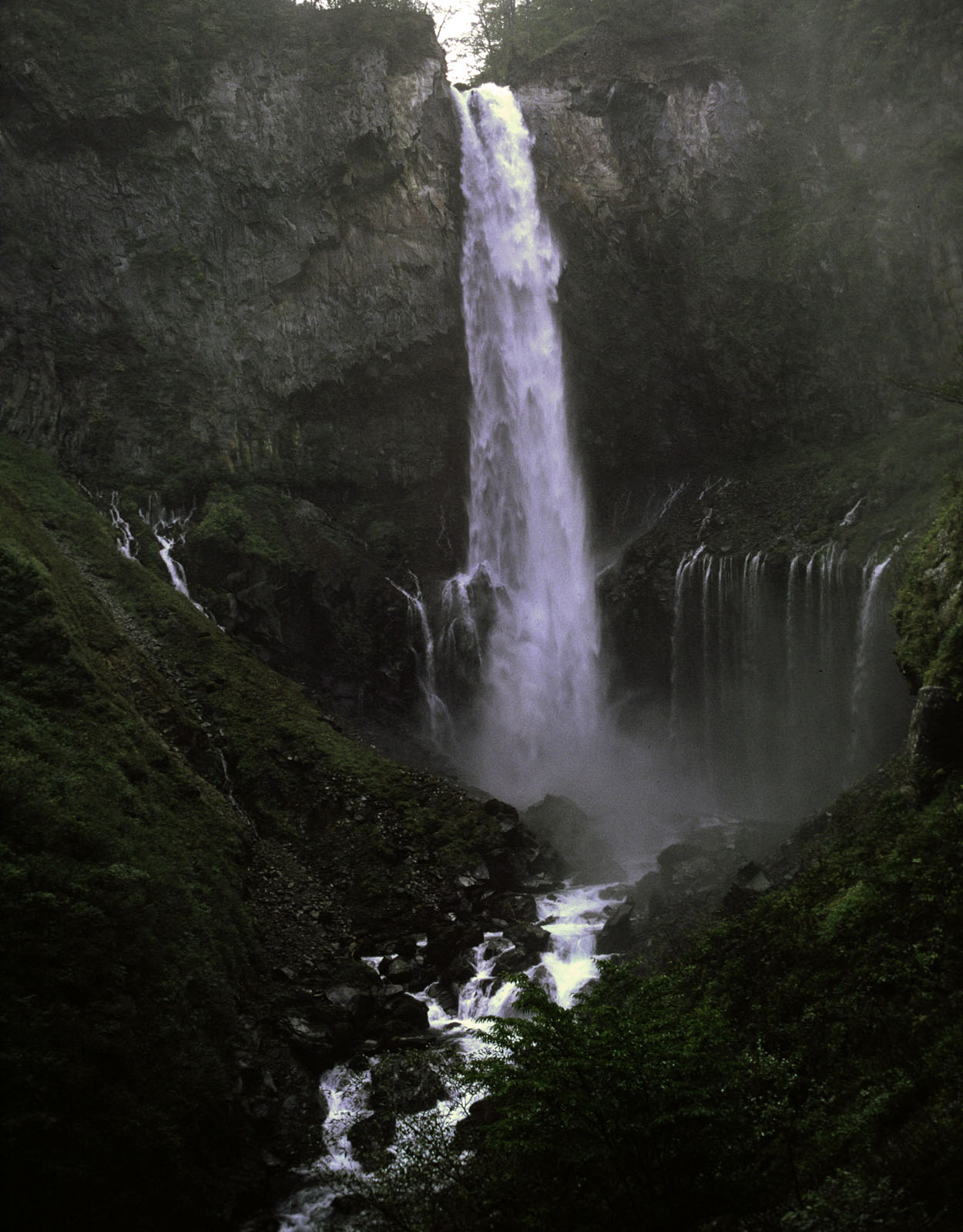
The Kegon Falls in Nikkō

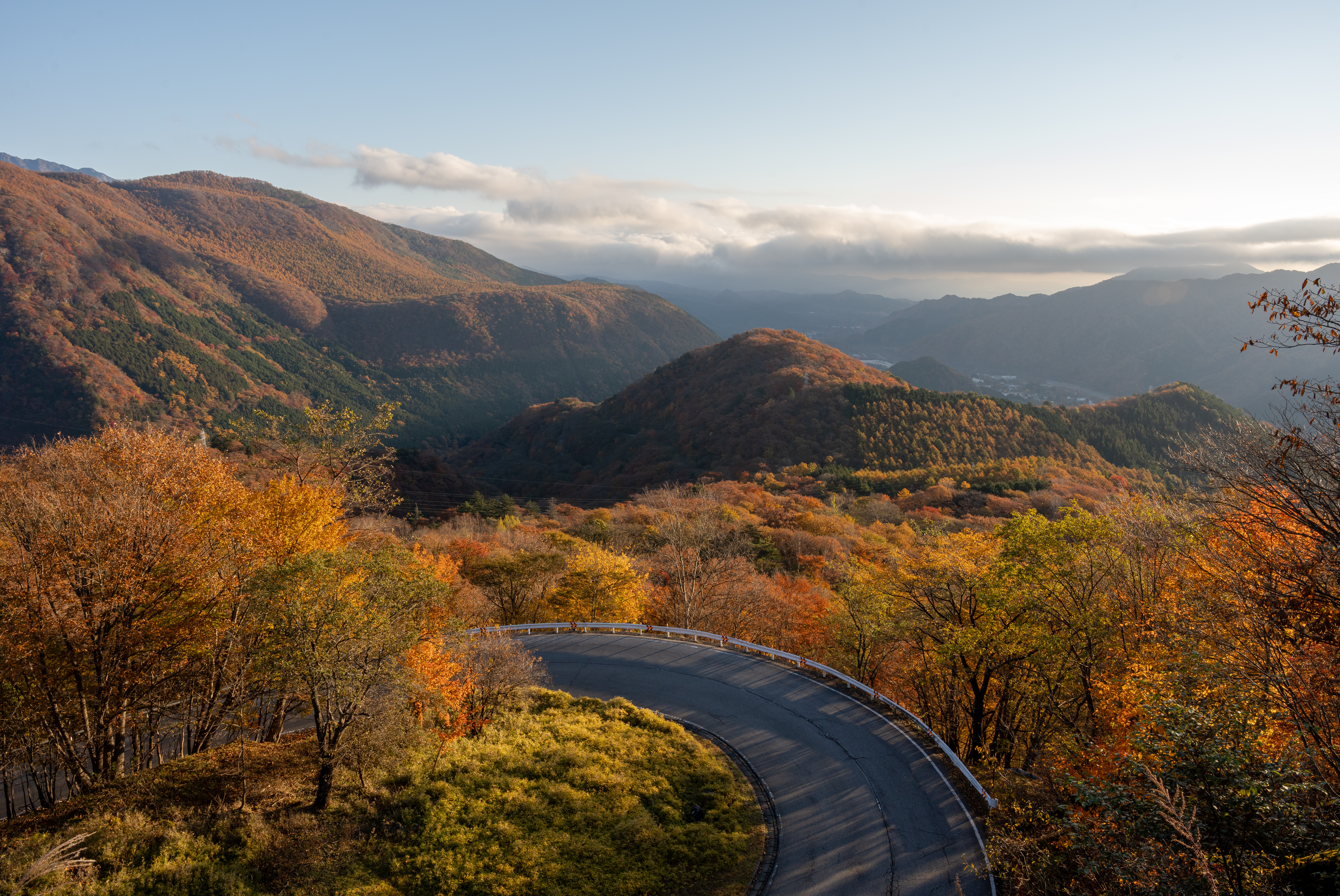
Iroha Slope, a view of attraction spot in Nikkō

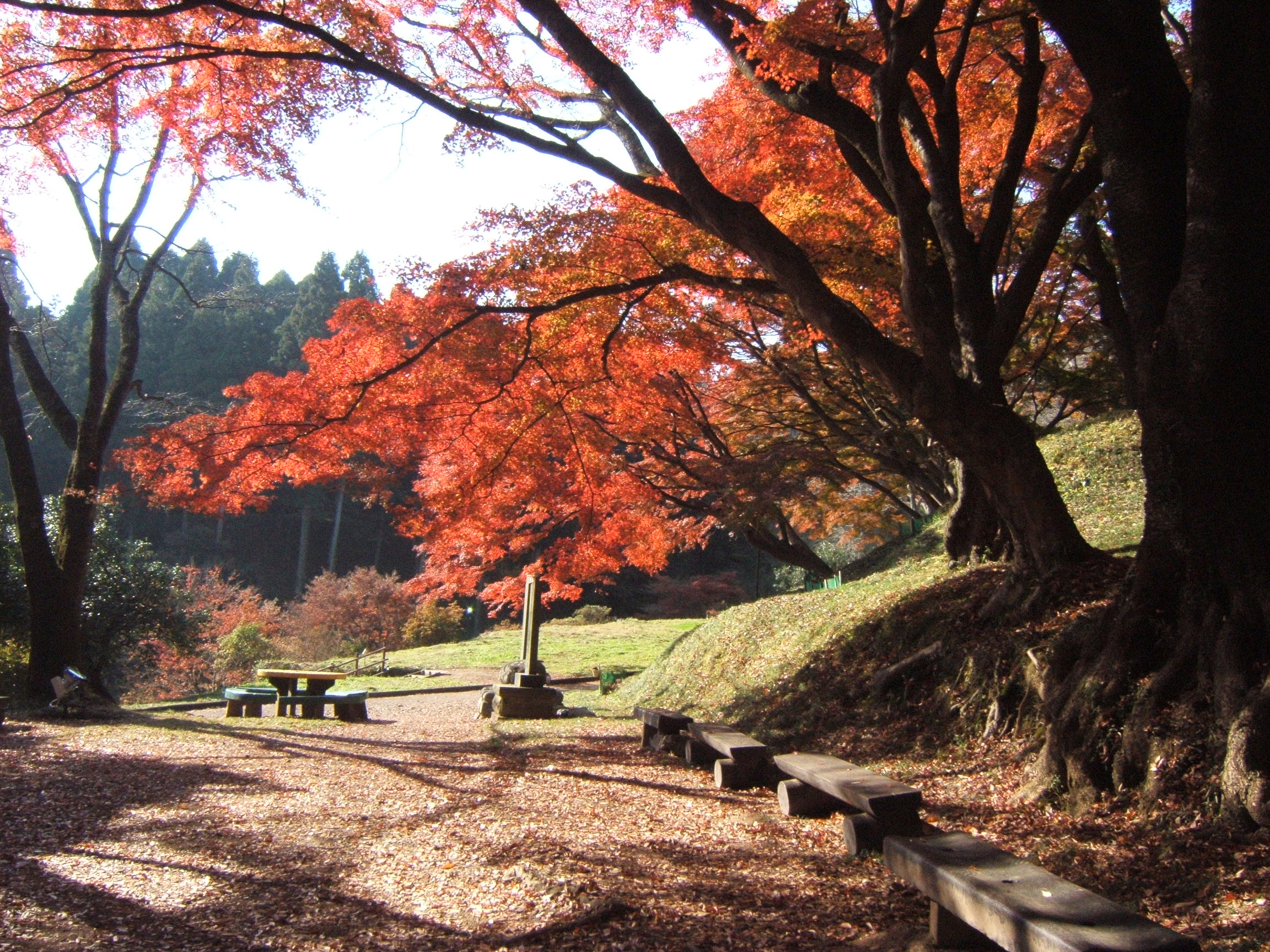
Autumn view over the ruins of Sakuyama castle in Gotenyama park, Ōtawara city, Tochigi prefecture

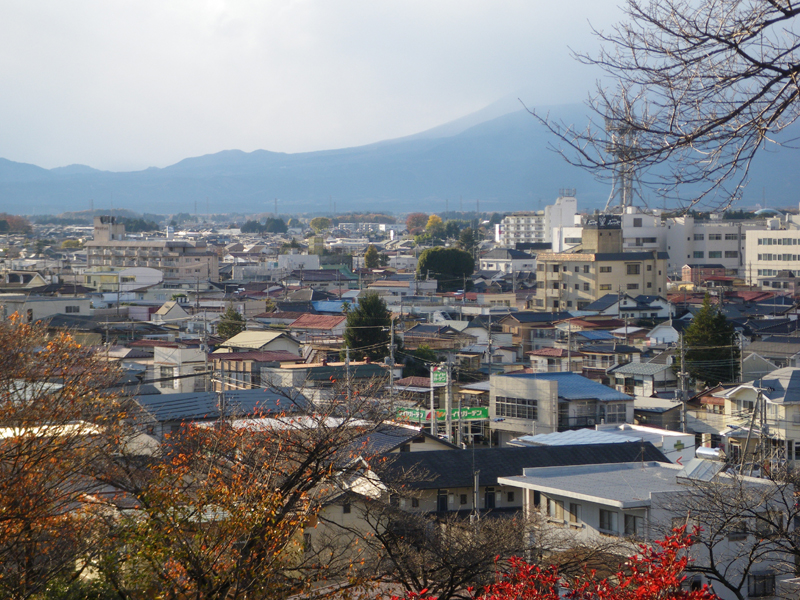
Otawara

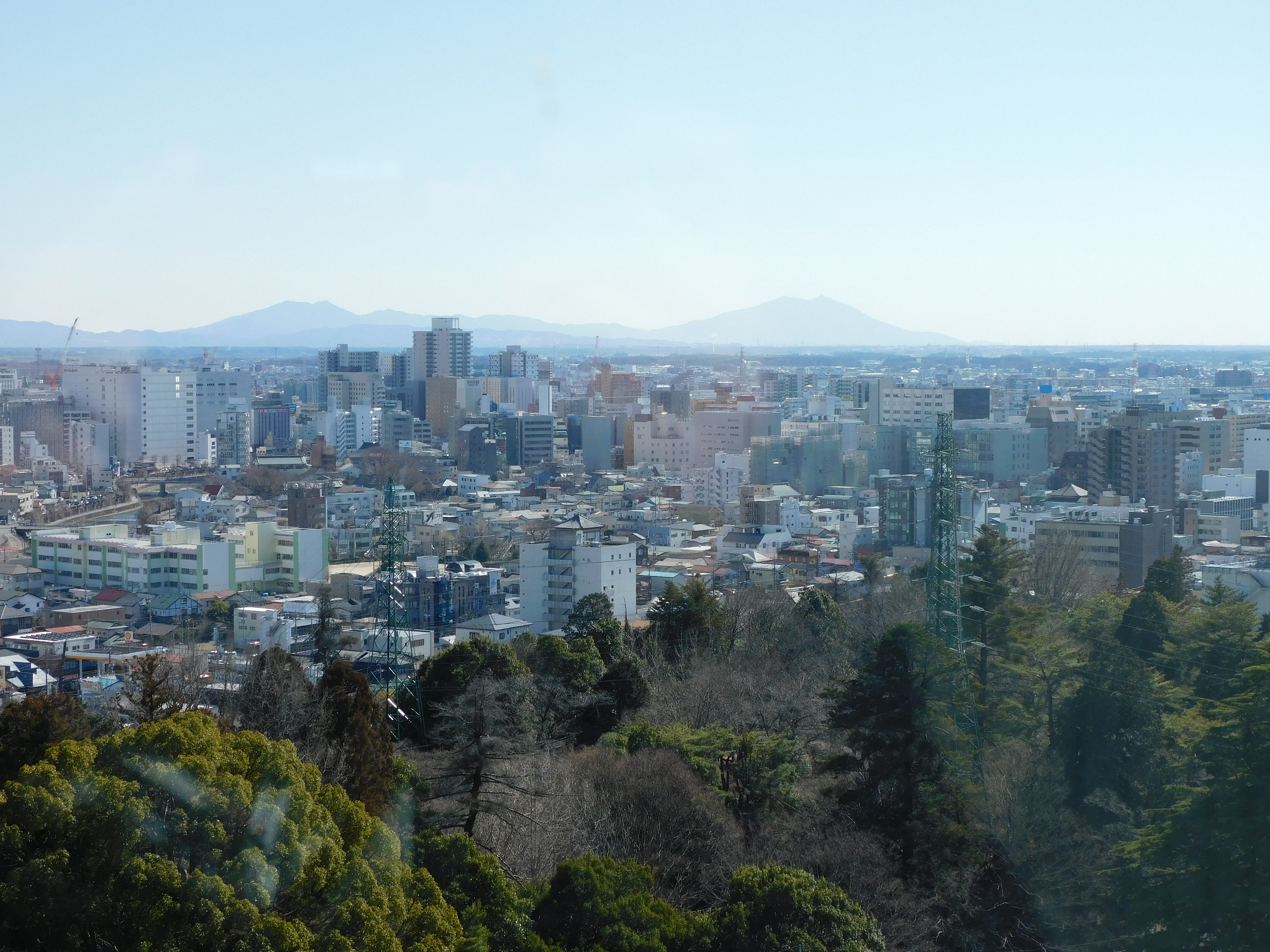
Utsunomiya

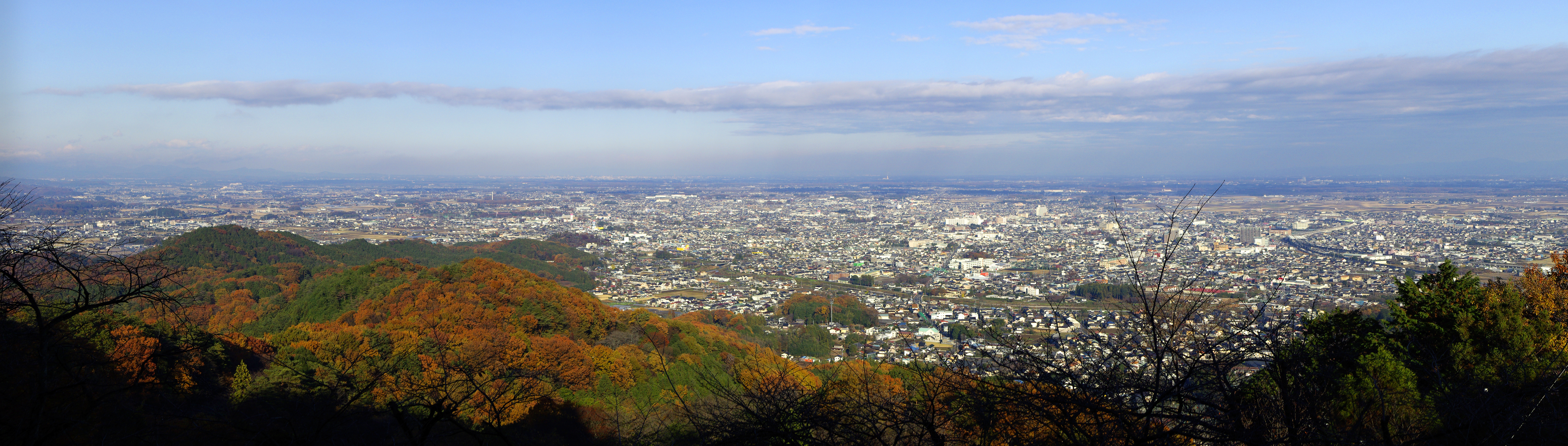
Tochigi City

=== Cities ===
Historical population
Year	Pop.	±% p.a.
1920	1,046,479	—
1925	1,090,428	+0.83%
1930	1,141,737	+0.92%
1935	1,195,057	+0.92%
1940	1,206,657	+0.19%
1945	1,546,355	+5.09%
1950	1,550,462	+0.05%
1955	1,547,580	−0.04%
1960	1,513,624	−0.44%
1965	1,521,656	+0.11%
1970	1,580,021	+0.76%
1975	1,698,003	+1.45%
1980	1,792,201	+1.09%
1985	1,866,066	+0.81%
1990	1,935,168	+0.73%
1995	1,984,390	+0.50%
2000	2,004,817	+0.21%
2005	2,016,631	+0.12%
2010	2,007,683	−0.09%
2015	1,974,255	−0.34%
2020	1,933,146	−0.42%
Source: Censuses

Fourteen cities are located in Tochigi Prefecture:

Name		Area (km^{2})	Population	Map
Rōmaji	Kanji	Area (km^{2})	Population	Map
Ashikaga	足利市	177.76	140,036	
Kanuma	鹿沼市	490.64	94,926	
Mooka	真岡市	167.34	78,720	
Nasukarasuyama	那須烏山市	174.35	25,783	
Nasushiobara	那須塩原市	592.74	115,794	
Nikkō	日光市	1,449.83	76,452	
Ōtawara	大田原市	354.36	73,189	
Oyama	小山市	171.76	167,647	
Sakura	さくら市	125.63	44,712	
Sano	佐野市	356.04	117,669	
Shimotsuke	下野市	74.59	60,274	
Tochigi	栃木市	331.50	151,842	
Utsunomiya (capital)	宇都宮市	416.85	513,584	
Yaita	矢板市	170.46	31,859	

=== Towns ===
These are the towns in each district:

Name		Area (km^{2})	Population	District	Map
Rōmaji	Kanji	Area (km^{2})	Population	District	Map
Haga	芳賀町	70.16	15,661	Haga District	
Ichikai	市貝町	64.25	11,684	Haga District	
Kaminokawa	上三川町	54.39	31,243	Kawachi District	
Mashiko	益子町	89.40	21,841	Haga District	
Mibu	壬生町	61.06	39,158	Shimotsuga District	
Motegi	茂木町	172.69	11,777	Haga District	
Nakagawa	那珂川町	192.78	15,824	Nasu District	
Nasu	那須町	372.34	24,851	Nasu District	
Nogi	野木町	30.26	25,050	Shimotsuga District	
Shioya	塩谷町	176.06	10,906	Shioya District	
Takanezawa	高根沢町	70.87	29,528	Shioya District	

== List of governors of Tochigi Prefecture (from 1947) ==
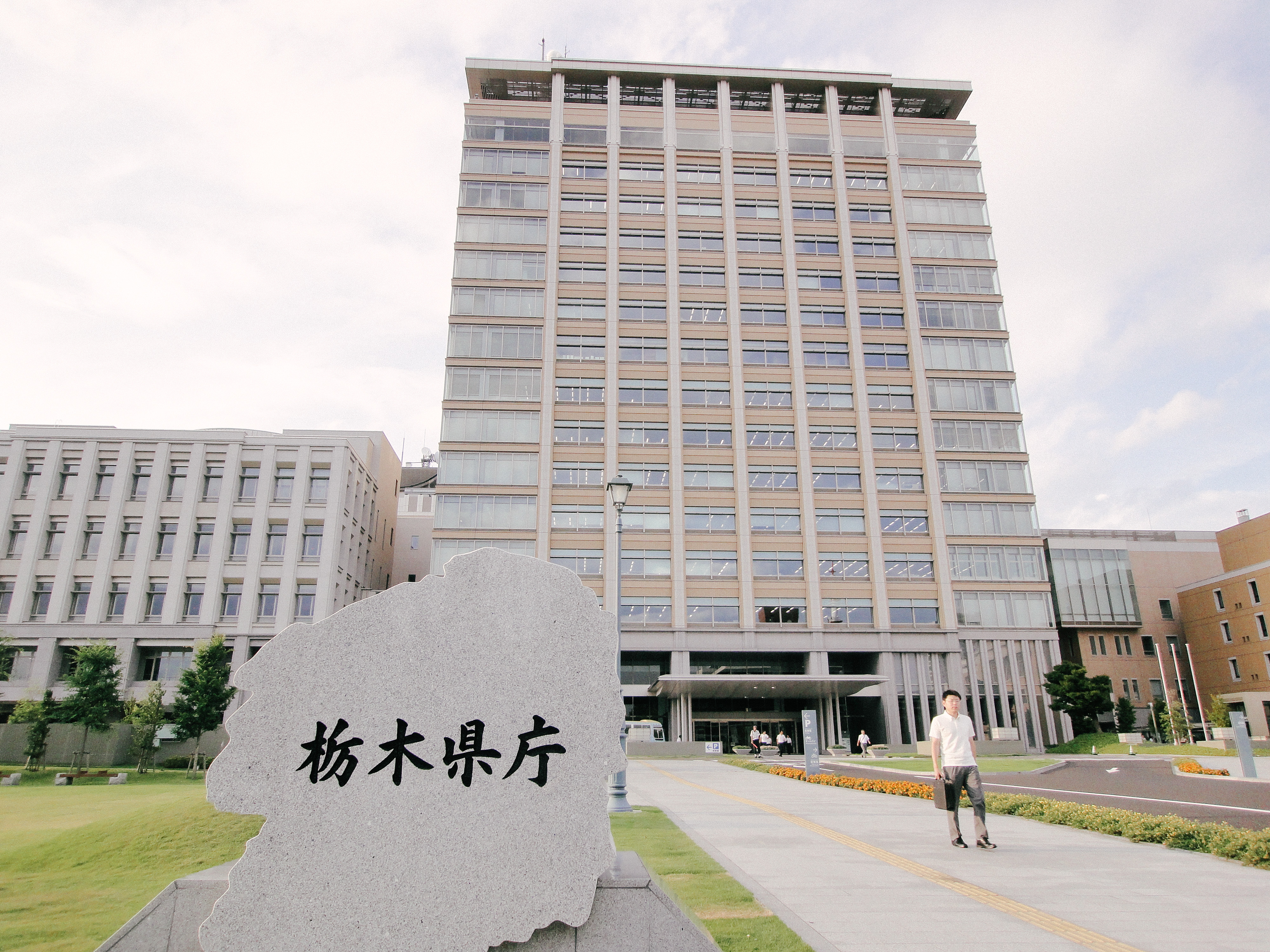
Tochigi Prefectural Government Office

No.	Governor (Birth–Death)	Term of office	
37–38	Jyukichi Kodaira (小平重吉) (1886–1960)	12 April 1947	4 February 1955
39	Kichi Ogawa (小川喜一) (1904–1979)	5 February 1955	4 February 1959
40–43	Nobuo Yokokawa (横川信夫) (1901–1975)	5 February 1959	7 December 1974
44–46	Yuzuru Funada (船田譲) (1923–1985)	8 December 1974	8 December 1984
47–50	Fumio Watanabe (渡辺文雄) (1929–)	9 December 1984	8 December 2000
51	Akio Fukuda (福田昭夫) (1948–)	9 December 2000	8 December 2004
52–55	Tomikazu Fukuda (福田富一) (1953–)	9 December 2004	Present

== Industry and agriculture ==
Tochigi prefecture population pyramid in 2020

Located close to Tōkyō, Tochigi is home to many corporations and industrial zones, including the Kiyohara Industrial Complex, one of the largest inland industrial complexes in the country.

Industrial manufacturing accounts for 36.6% of the prefecture's total output. Vehicle parts and accessories are the primary products, followed by vehicles, radios and televisions, pharmaceuticals, and wireless communication equipment.

Below are goods manufactured in Tochigi with the highest market share in Japan:

Product	Share
Camera lenses	71.3%
X-ray equipment for medical use	54.5%
Machinery and appliances for dental use	23.5%
X-ray equipment parts	57.5%
Injection molded plastic parts	14.1%

(The 2004 industrial analysis report published by the Ministry of Economy, Trade and Industry)

The annual gross agricultural output in Tochigi is about 274 billion yen. Rice, vegetables, and livestock are produced in the region. Tochigi is also known for strawberries, Chinese chives, and Japanese pears sold throughout Japan and exported to other countries. Approximately 55% of Tochigi is covered by forests. Mushrooms, such as Shiitake mushrooms, make up half of the forest industry, with an output of approximately 5.6 billion yen.

== Education ==
Tochigi is home to many universities and colleges including those for science and technology, literature, medicine, education, and art. Below is an alphabetical list of some of the universities located in Tochigi.

- Ashikaga Institute of Technology
- Bunsei University of Art, Utsunomiya
- Dokkyo University School of Medicine, Mibu
- Hakuoh University, Oyama
- International University of Health and Welfare, Otawara
- Jichi Medical University, Shimotsuke
- Oyama National College of Technology
- Sakushin Gakuin University, Utsunomiya
- Sano College
- Teikyo University, Utsunomiya
- Tochigi College of Industry and Technology (Central), Utsunomiya
- Tochigi College of Industry and Technology (North), Nasu
- Tochigi College of Industry and Technology (South), Ashikaga
- Utsunomiya Kyowa University, Utsunomiya and Nasushiobara
- Utsunomiya University

== Sports ==
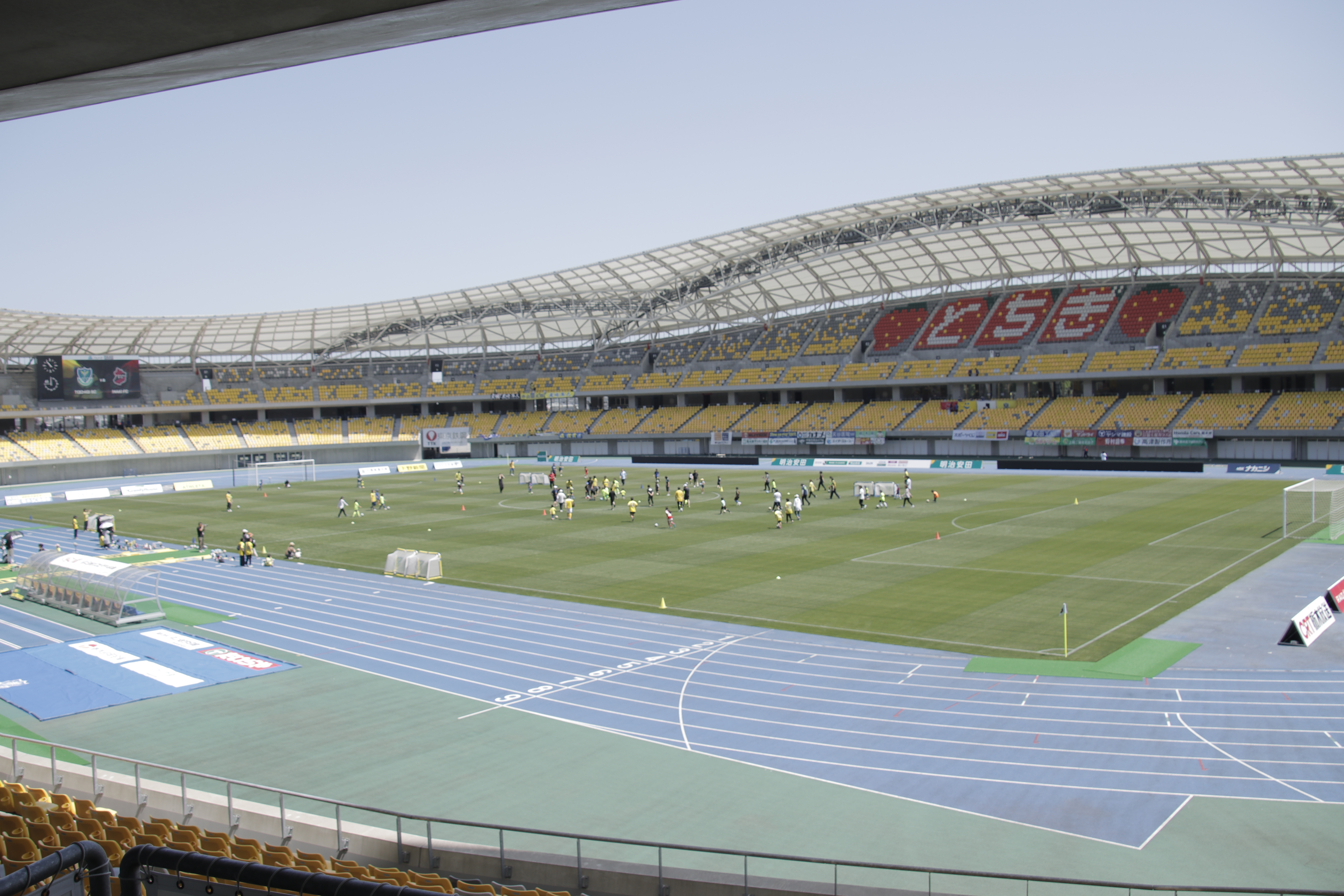
Kanseki Stadium Tochigi in Utsunomiya, a home association football club of Tochigi SC.

The sports teams and events listed below are based in Tochigi.

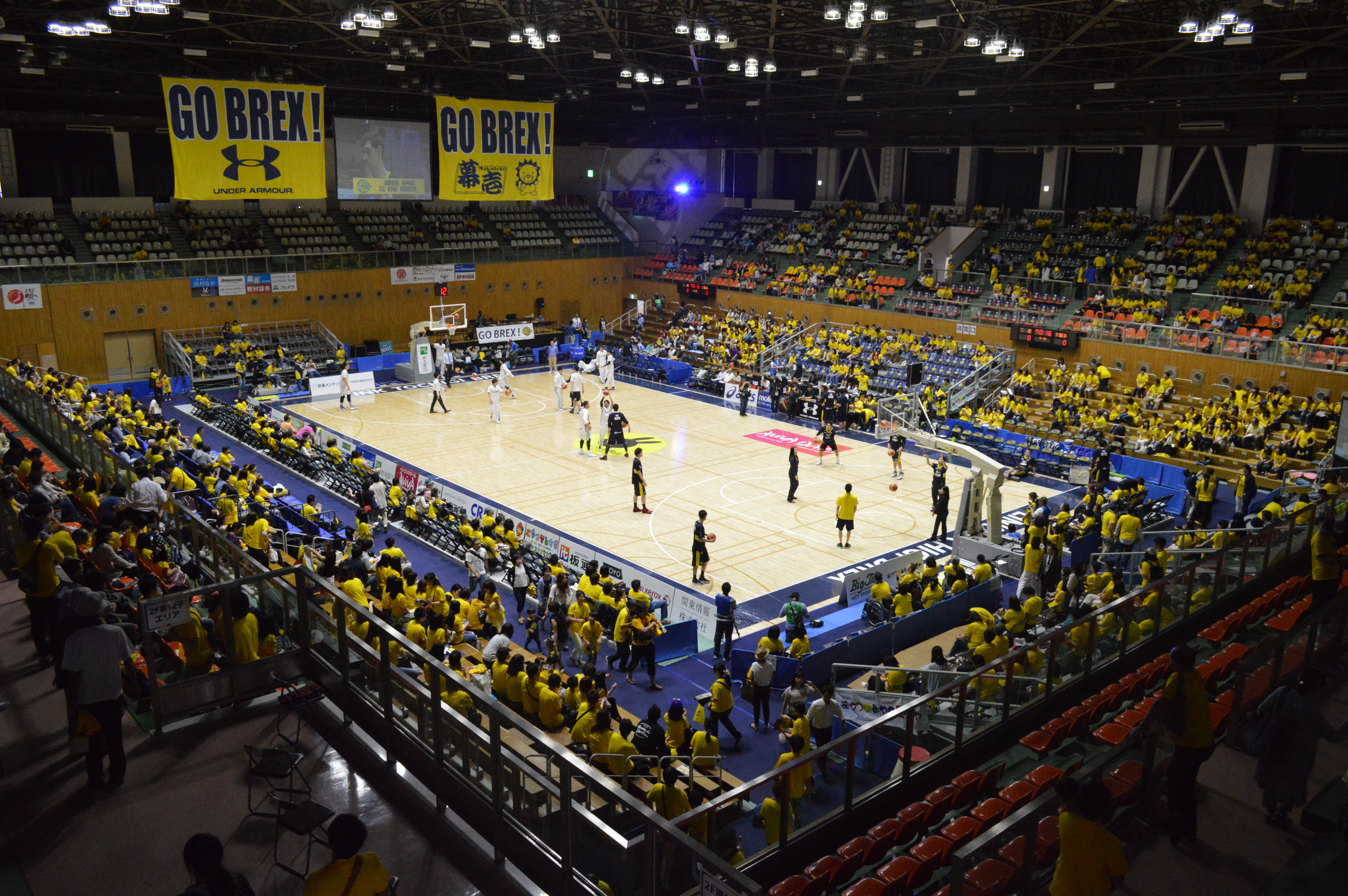
Utsunomiya Brex, a professional basketball team of B.League in Utsunomiya

=== Association football ===
- Tochigi City FC (Tochigi)
- Tochigi SC (Utsunomiya)

=== Ice hockey ===
- Nikkō Ice Bucks (Nikkō)

=== Basketball ===
- Utsunomiya Brex

=== Motorsport ===
- Twin Ring Motegi circuit
- Nikkō Circuit

=== Cycling ===
Tour de Tochigi, a cat 2.2 three-day road race of the UCI Asia Tour

== Tourism ==
Nikkō National Park is famous for its UNESCO World Heritage Site which was registered as the 10th World Heritage Site in 1999. This encompasses Rinnō-ji, Nikkō Tōshō-gū, Mount Nantai, and Futarasan Shrine. The Kegon Falls, also in Nikkō, is popular with tourists. To travel between the city and the falls, automobiles and buses take the Irohazaka, a road with dozens of switchbacks. In addition, 400-year-old Japanese Cedars (about 13,000 in total) line the famous Cedar Avenue of Nikkō for roughly 35 km, making it the longest tree-lined avenue in the world.

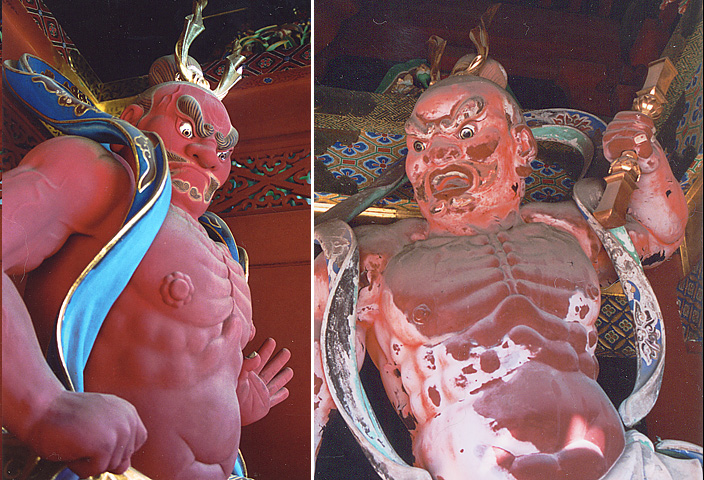
Statues in Nikkō

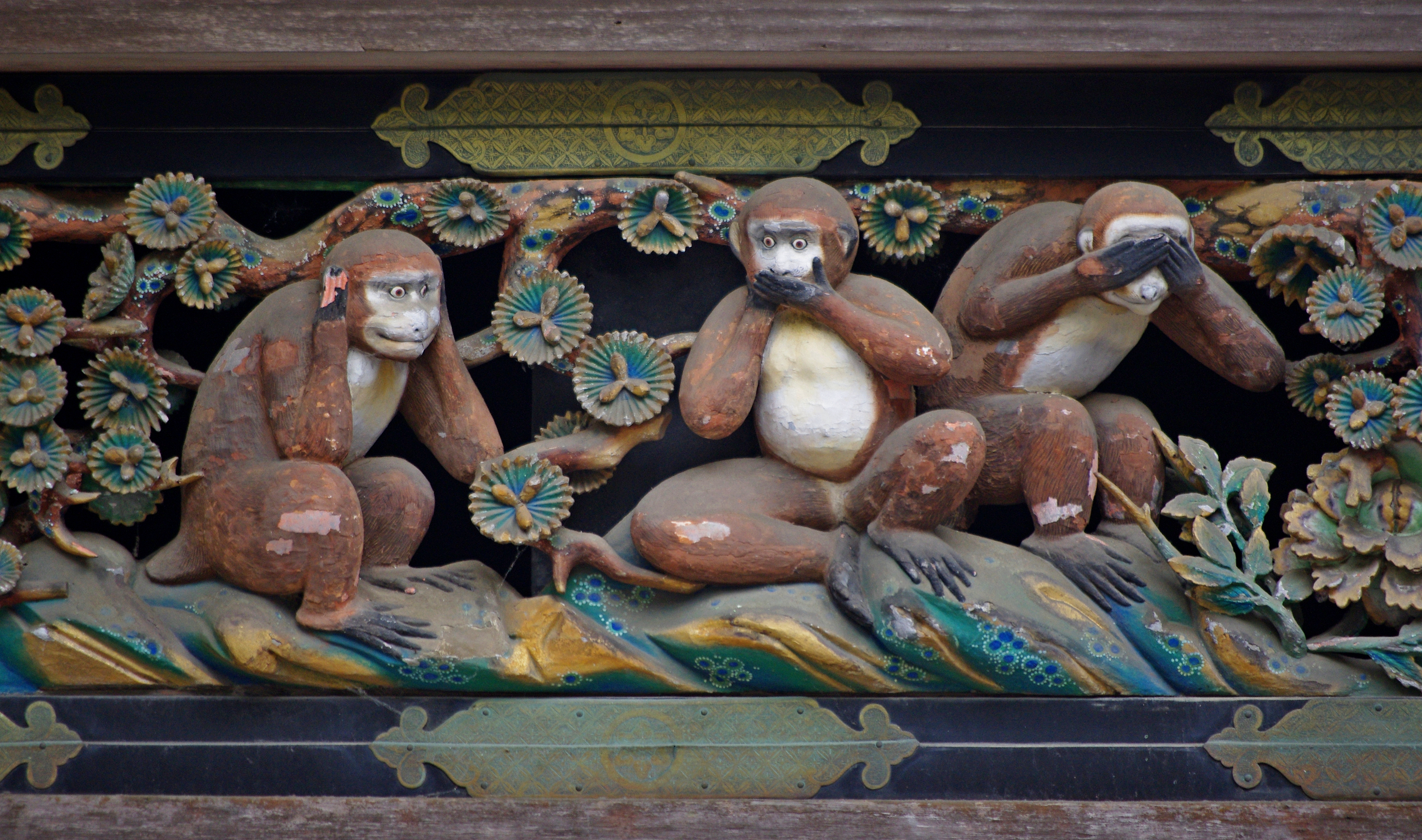
Three wise monkeys at Nikkō Tōshō-gū

A more recent and modern attraction is the Twin Ring Motegi Circuit race course, which hosts the only IndyCar race outside the United States. The track also hosts many other race events including Super Formula and motorcycle races as well as festivals and fireworks events.

Tochigi has many traditional festivals and events such as Nikkō Tōshō-gū's 1000 Samurai Procession and Horseback Archery Festival, and the city of Tochigi's Autumn Festival where doll floats are pulled around the city once every five years.

Other attractions include:

- Ashikaga Flower Park
- Cannabis Museum
- Edo Wonderland Nikko Edomura
- Futarasan Shrine
- Kegon Falls
- Kinugawa (hot spring)
- Kirifuri Falls
- Lake Chūzenji
- Mashiko
- Nakagawa Aquatic Park
- Nasu Animal Kingdom
- Nasu resort area
- Nikkō Tōshō-gū
- Rinnō-ji
- Sankenkyō
- Shiobara Hot Spring
- Tobu World Square

== Transportation and access ==
=== Roads ===
Traversing the prefecture along the north–south axis and connecting to the rest of the country are the Tōhoku Expressway and the new and old Route 4. From east to west spans Route 50, connecting southern Tochigi with Ibaraki and Gunma Prefectures.

Also connecting Tochigi, Gunma, and Ibaraki is the Kita-Kantō Expressway, with the 18.5 km that connect the Tochigi-Tsuga Interchange and the Utsunomiya-Kaminokawa Interchange. Portions of the Kita-Kantō Expressway are still being constructed and is set to be fully completed by 2011. The highway will link the region's other main transport arteries, the Tōhoku, the Jōban and the Kan-Etsu Expressways, providing a link to the international port of Hitachinaka in Ibaraki.

=== Rail ===
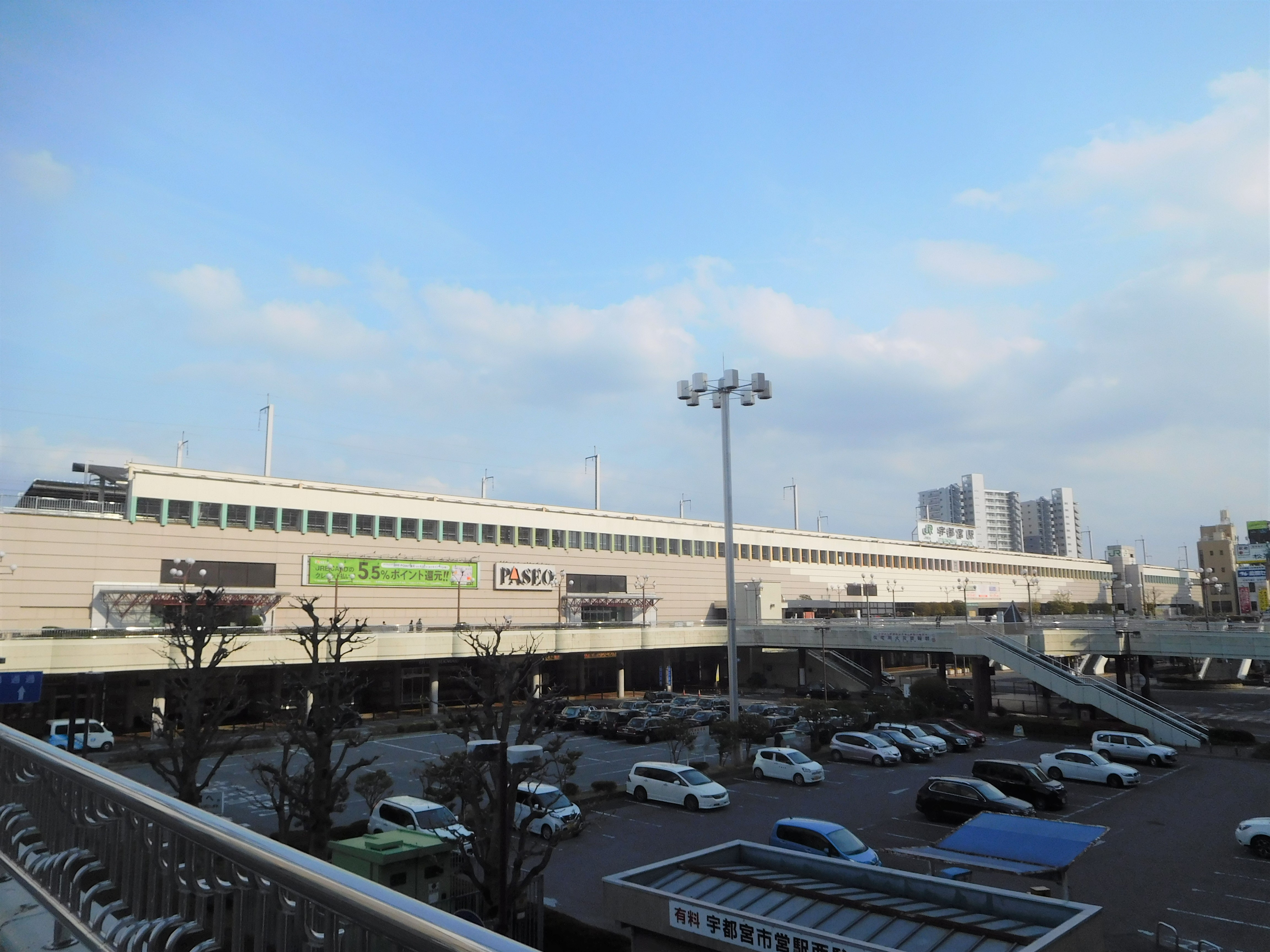
JR Utsunomiya Station

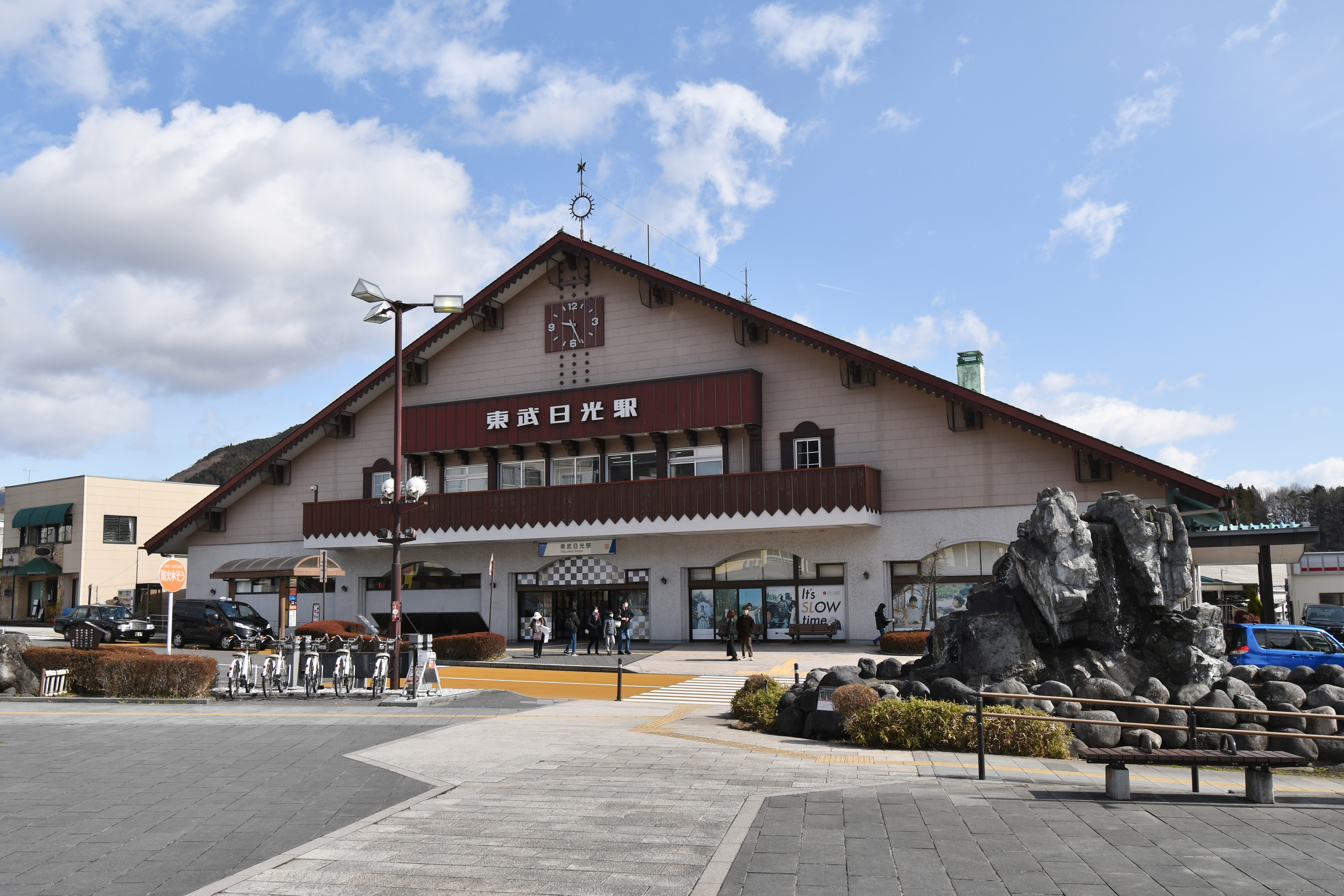
Tōbu Nikkō Station

The Tōhoku Shinkansen and the JR Utsunomiya Line are the main railways running north and south in Tochigi. Shinkansen runs from Tokyo Station to Oyama in south Tochigi in 43 minutes. Utsunomiya can be reached by rail in as little as 48 minutes, and many parts of Tochigi are within commuting range of central Tokyo. To the east and west, the Mito and Ryōmō Lines connect Tochigi to Ibaraki and Gunma.

Freight is served by the Utsunomiya Freight Terminal.

- East Japan Railway Company
  - Karasuyama Line
  - Mito Line
  - Nikkō Line
  - Ryōmō Line
  - Shōnan-Shinjuku Line
  - Tōhoku Shinkansen
  - Utsunomiya Line (Tōhoku Main Line)
- Mooka Railway
- Tobu
  - Isesaki Line
  - Nikkō Line
  - Kinugawa Line
  - Utsunomiya Line
  - Sano Line
- Utsunomiya Light Rail
  - LIGHTLINE (Utsunomiya Haga Light Rail Line)
- Watarase Keikoku Line
- Yagan Railway

=== Air travel ===
Fukushima Airport is approximately an hour's drive from Utsunomiya on the Tōhoku Expressway. International and national air transportation is through Narita International Airport to the east of Tokyo, approximately three hours by vehicle from Utsunomiya.

== International relations ==
Tochigi has cooperative agreements with three states or provinces in other countries.

- Indiana, United States
- Vaucluse, France
- Zhejiang, China

== Sources ==
- Nussbaum, Louis-Frédéric and Käthe Roth (2005). Japan Encyclopedia. Cambridge, Mass.: Harvard University Press. ISBN 978-0-674-01753-5; OCLC 58053128.
