= List of Japanese prefectures by highest mountain =

The table shows the highest mountains by prefectures of Japan. Where the highest point of a prefecture is not a peak, it will be separately described.

== List ==
Highest mountains
Prefecture	Mountain	Elevation (m)	Cordillera	Note	Image
Hokkaido	Daisetsuzan (Asahi-dake)	2,291	Ishikari Mountains	100 Famous Japanese Mountains	Asahi-dake, Daisetsuzan, Hokkaido
Aomori	Mount Iwaki	1,625	Standalone	100 Famous Japanese Mountains	Mount Iwaki, Aomori
Iwate	Mount Iwate	2,038	Ōu Mountains	100 Famous Japanese Mountains	Mount Iwate, Iwate
Miyagi	Mount Byōbu	1,825	Mount Zaō	100 Famous Japanese Mountains	Mount Byōbu, Mount Zaō, Miyagi
Akita	Mount Akita-Komagatake (Onagadake)	1,637	Ōu Mountains	200 Famous Japanese Mountains	Akita-Komagatake, Akita
Yamagata	Mount Chōkai (Shinzan)	2,236	Hinotodake Mountains	100 Famous Japanese Mountains	Mount Chōkai, Iwate
Fukushima	Mount Hiuchigatake (Shibayasugura)	2,356	Standalone	100 Famous Japanese Mountains	Hiuchigatake, Fukushima
Ibaraki	Mount Yamizo	1,022	Yamizo Mountains	300 Famous Japanese Mountains	link
Tochigi	Mount Nikkō-Shirane	2,578	Nikkō Mountains	100 Famous Japanese Mountains	Mount Nikkō-Shirane, Tochigi and Gunma
Gunma	Mount Nikkō-Shirane	2,578	Nikkō Mountains	100 Famous Japanese Mountains	Mount Nikkō-Shirane, Tochigi and Gunma
Saitama	Mount Sanpō	2,483	Okuchichibu Mountains		Mount Sanpō, Saitama
Chiba	Mount Atago	408	Bōsō Hill Range	JASDF Mineokayama Sub Base	Mount Atago, Chiba
Tokyo	Mount Kumotori	2,017	Okutama	100 Famous Japanese Mountains	Mount Kumotori, Tokyo
Kanagawa	Mount Hiru	1,673	Tanzawa Mountains	100 Famous Japanese Mountains	Mount Hiru, Kanagawa
Niigata	Mount Korenge	2,766	Northern Alps		Mount Korenge, Niigata
Toyama	Mount Tate (Mount Ōnanji)	3,015	Northern Alps	100 Famous Japanese Mountains	Mount Tate, Toyama
Ishikawa	Mount Haku (Gozengamine)	2,702	Ryōhaku Mountains	100 Famous Japanese Mountains	Mount Haku, Ishikawa
Fukui	Mount Sannomine	2,095	Ryōhaku Mountains	Southern peak of Mount Sannomine	Mount Sannomine, Fukui
Yamanashi	Mount Fuji (Kengamine)	3,776	Standalone	100 Famous Japanese Mountains	Mount Fuji, Yamanashi and Shizuoka
Nagano	Mount Hotakadake	3,190	Northern Alps	100 Famous Japanese Mountains	Mount Hotakadake, Nagano and Gifu
Gifu	Mount Hotakadake	3,190	Northern Alps	100 Famous Japanese Mountains	Mount Hotakadake, Nagano and Gifu
Shizuoka	Mount Fuji (Kengamine)	3,776	Standalone	100 Famous Japanese Mountains	Mount Fuji, Yamanashi and Shizuoka
Aichi	Mount Chausu	1,415	Minomikawa Highland		Mount Chausu, Aichi
Mie	Mount Ōdaigahara (Hinodegatake)	1,695	Kii Mountains	100 Famous Japanese Mountains	Mount Ōdaigahara, Mie
Shiga	Mount Ibuki	1,377	Ibuki Mountains	100 Famous Japanese Mountains	Mount Ibuki, Shiga
Kyoto	Mount Minago	972	Tamba Mountains		Mount Minago, Kyoto
Osaka	Mount Yamato Katsuragi	959	Kongō Range	300 Famous Japanese Mountains	Mount Yamato Katsuragi, Osaka
Hyogo	Mount Hyōno	1,510	Chūgoku Mountains	200 Famous Japanese Mountains	Mount Hyōno, Hyogo
Nara Prefecture	Mount Hakkyō (Mount Hakken)	1,915	Kii Mountains	100 Famous Japanese Mountains	Mount Hakkyō, Nara
Wakayama	Mount Ryūjin	1,382	Kii Mountains		Mount Ryujin, Wakayama
Tottori	Mount Daisen (Kengamine)	1,729	Daisen Mountains	100 Famous Japanese Mountains	Mount Daisen, Tottori
Shimane	Mount Osorakan	1,346	Kanmuri Mountains		Mount Osorakan, Shimane and Hiroshima
Okayama	Mount Ushiro	1,345	Chūgoku Mountains		link
Hiroshima	Mount Osorakan	1,346	Kanmuri Mountains		Mount Osorakan, Shimane and Hiroshima
Yamaguchi	Mount Jakuchi	1,337	Kanmuri Mountains		Mount Jakuchi, Yamaguchi
Tokushima	Mount Tsurugi	1,955	Shikoku Mountains	100 Famous Japanese Mountains	link
Kagawa	Mount Ryūō	1,060	Sanuki Mountains		Mount Ryūō, Kagawa
Ehime	Mount Ishizuchi (Tengadake)	1,982	Shikoku Mountains	100 Famous Japanese Mountains	link
Kochi	Mount Miune	1,893	Shikoku Mountains	200 Famous Japanese Mountains	Mount Miune, Kochi
Fukuoka	Mount Shaka	1,230	Tsue Cordillera (Shakagatake)		Mount Shakagatake, Fukuoka
Saga	Mount Kyō	1,076	Tara Mountains	300 Famous Japanese Mountains	Mountain Kyōgatake, Saga
Nagasaki	Mount Unzen (Heisei Shizan)	1,486	Unzen Mountains	200 Famous Japanese Mountains	Mount Unzen, Nagasaki
Kumamoto	Mount Kunimi	1,739	Kyushu Mountains	300 Famous Japanese Mountains	
Ōita	Mount Kujū (Nakadake)	1,791	Kyushu Mountains	100 Famous Japanese Mountains	Mount Kujū, Ōita
Miyazaki	Mount Sobo	1,756	Kyushu Mountains	100 Famous Japanese Mountains	Mount Sobo, Miyazaki
Kagoshima	Mount Miyanoura	1,936	Yakushima	100 Famous Japanese Mountains	Mount Miyanoura, Kagoshima
Okinawa	Mount Omoto	526	Ishigaki Island		Mount Omoto, Okinawa

== See also ==
- List of mountains and hills of Japan by height
- List of tallest buildings by Japanese prefecture
