= Nikkō National Park =

National Park in Kantō, Japan

- 日光国立公園
- IUCN category II (national park)
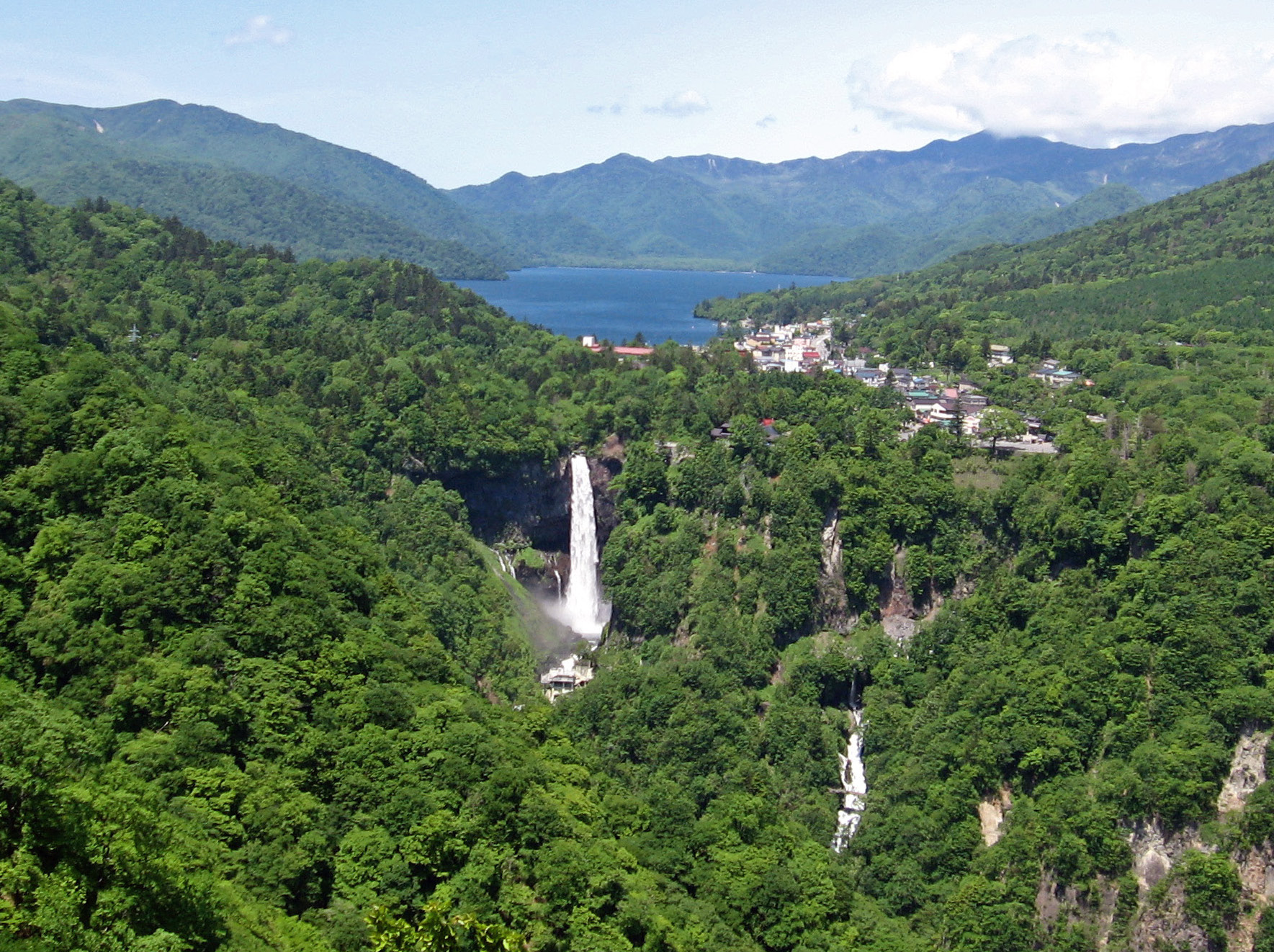
- Kegon Falls and Lake Chūzenji, Nikkō National Park.

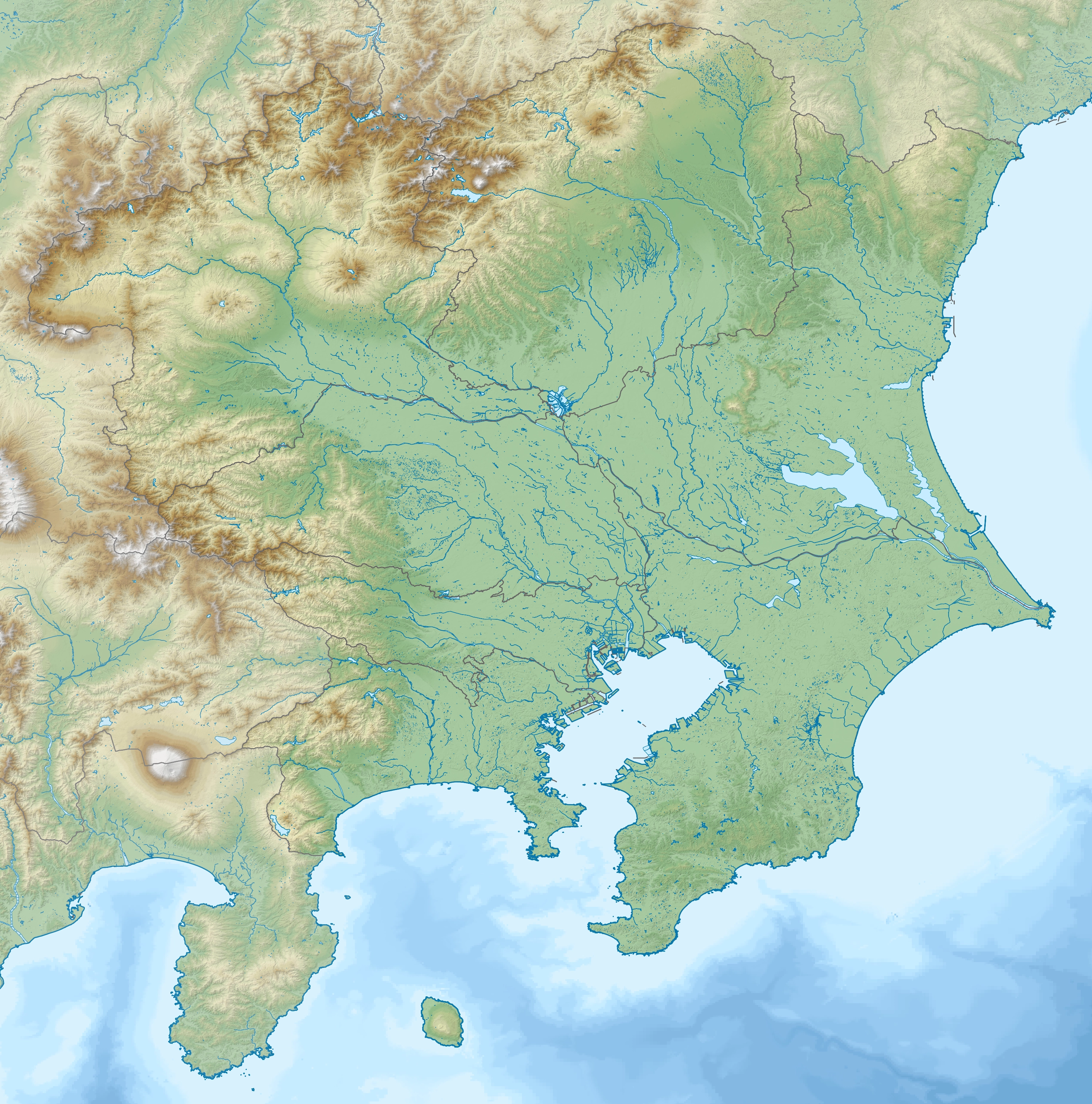
- Location within Kanto Area Location within Japan
- Location: Honshū, Japan
- Nearest city: Nikkō, Tochigi Prefecture
- Coordinates: 36°58′43″N 139°23′42″E
- Area: 1,149.08 km^{2} (443.66 sq mi)
- Established: December 4, 1934
- Governing body: Ministry of the Environment

Nikkō National Park (日光国立公園, Nikkō Kokuritsu Kōen) is a national park in the Kantō region, on the main island of Honshū in Japan. The park spreads over three prefectures: Tochigi, Gunma and Fukushima, and was established in 1934.

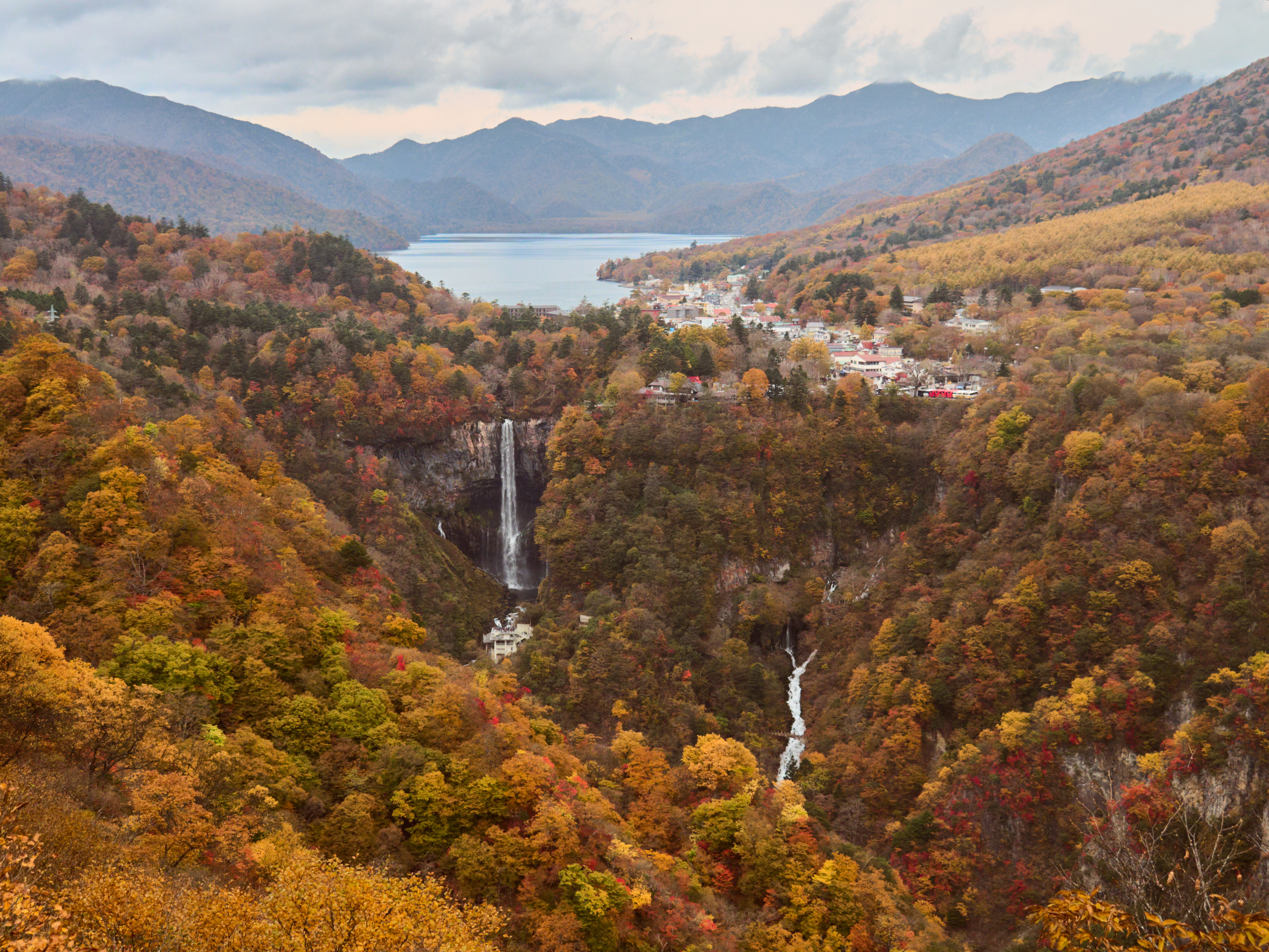
Kegon Falls and Lake Chuzenji in autumn.

== History ==
The establishment of Nikkō National Park dates to the early 20th century. The Diet of Japan designated Nikkō an imperial park (帝国公園, teikoku kōen) in 1911. The National Parks Law was passed in 1931, and Nikkō National Park was established in 1934. The park was expanded throughout the 20th century. Oze National Park was once part of Nikkō National Park, but became a separate national park in 2007.

== Description ==
The park is considered one of the most beautiful in Japan, and is a popular tourist destination. Beyond its striking scenery, the park is noted for its historical Buddhist temples and Shinto shrines, most notably the Nikkō Tōshō-gū and Rinnō-ji. They are designated a UNESCO World Heritage Site as the "Shrines and Temples of Nikkō".

The park is free entry and is divided into three zones, such as Nikko, Kinugawa/Kuriyama, Nasu Kashi/Shiobara.

== Notable places ==
- Nikkō Tōshō-gū, a Shinto shrine, Nikkō, Tochigi Prefecture
- Lake Chūzenji, 11.62 square kilometres (4.49 mi^{2}), a scenic lake, Nikkō
- Kegon Falls, 97 metres (318 ft), one of Japan's three highest waterfalls
- Mount Nantai, 2,486 metres (8,156 ft), rises dramatically above Lake Chūzenji
- Mount Nikkō-Shirane, 2,578 metres (8,458 ft), a shield volcano
- Rinnō-ji, a Buddhist temple, Nikkō
- Ryūzu Falls, 60 metres (200 ft), a scenic twin waterfalls
- Sessho-seki, a "killing stone" that fractured in 2022

== Flora ==
Nikkō National Park is noted for numerous species of plants and trees, including mizu-bashō, the white skunk cabbage of the Ozegahara marshland, maples, firs, and magnificent stands of sugi, the Japanese cedar that line the roads around Nikkō.

== Recreation ==
Nikkō National Park is a popular destination for hiking, skiing, camping, golfing, and its numerous historical onsen hot spring resorts.

== See also ==
- List of national parks of Japan
