= Mount Shirane =

Mount Shirane may refer to:

- Mount Kusatsu-Shirane
- Mount Nikkō-Shirane
