= Ryujin (disambiguation) =

Ryūjin is the deity of the sea in Japanese mythology.

Ryūjin or Ryujin may also refer to:

== Places ==
- Ryūjin, Wakayama, a small village that was merged into the city of Tanabe, Japan in 2005
- Mount Ryūjin, the highest point in Wakayama Prefecture, Japan

== Entertainment ==
- Ryujin (rapper) (born 2001), South Korean rapper, member of girl group Itzy
- Ryu Jin (born 1972), South Korean actor
- Ryujin (band), a Japanese metal band formerly known as Gyze
