= Kegon Falls =

Waterfall in Tochigi Prefecture, Japan

Kegon Falls 華厳滝 - Kegon no Taki
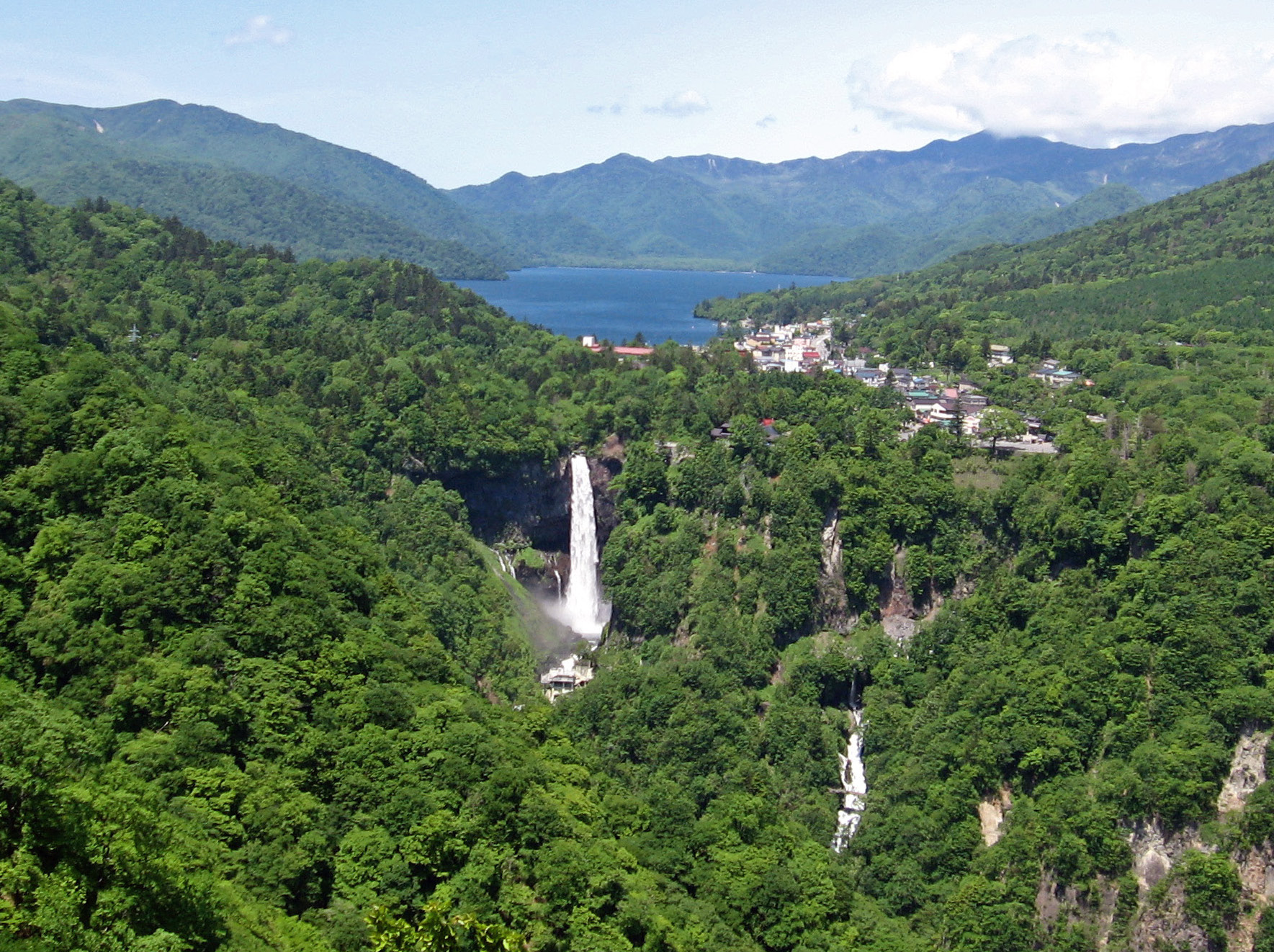
- Kegon Falls and Lake Chūzenji

- Location within Japan
- Location: Nikkō National Park, Tochigi Prefecture, Honshū, Japan
- Coordinates: 36°44′17″N 139°30′09″E
- Type: Plunge
- Total height: 97 metres (318 ft)
- Number of drops: 1
- Total width: 7 metres (23 ft)
- Watercourse: Oshiri River

Kegon Falls (華厳滝, Kegon no Taki) is located at Lake Chūzenji (source of the Oshiri River) in Nikkō National Park near the city of Nikkō, Tochigi Prefecture, Japan. The falls were formed when the Daiya River was rerouted by lava flows. The main falls had a height of approximately 97 metres (318 ft) and about twelve smaller waterfalls are situated behind and to the sides of Kegon Falls, leaking through the many cracks between the mountain and the lava flows.

In the autumn, the traffic on the road from Nikko to Chūzenji can sometimes slow to a crawl as visitors come to see the autumn foliage.

In 1927, the Kegon Falls was recognized as one of the "Eight Views" which best showed Japan and its culture in the Shōwa period. It is also listed as one of "Japan’s Top 100 Waterfalls", in a listing published by the Japanese Ministry of the Environment in 1990.

The Kegon Falls are infamous for suicides, especially among Japanese youth.

== Suicides ==
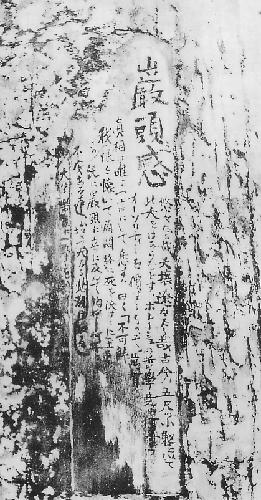
Death poem of Misao Fujimura.

Misao Fujimura (1886 – May 22, 1903), a Japanese philosophy student and poet, is largely remembered due to his farewell poem written directly on the trunk of a tree before committing suicide by jumping from the Kegon Falls.

The story was soon sensationalized in contemporary newspapers and was commented upon by writer Natsume Sōseki. This led the now famed falls to become a notorious spot for people to take their lives at (Werther Effect).

== Gallery ==
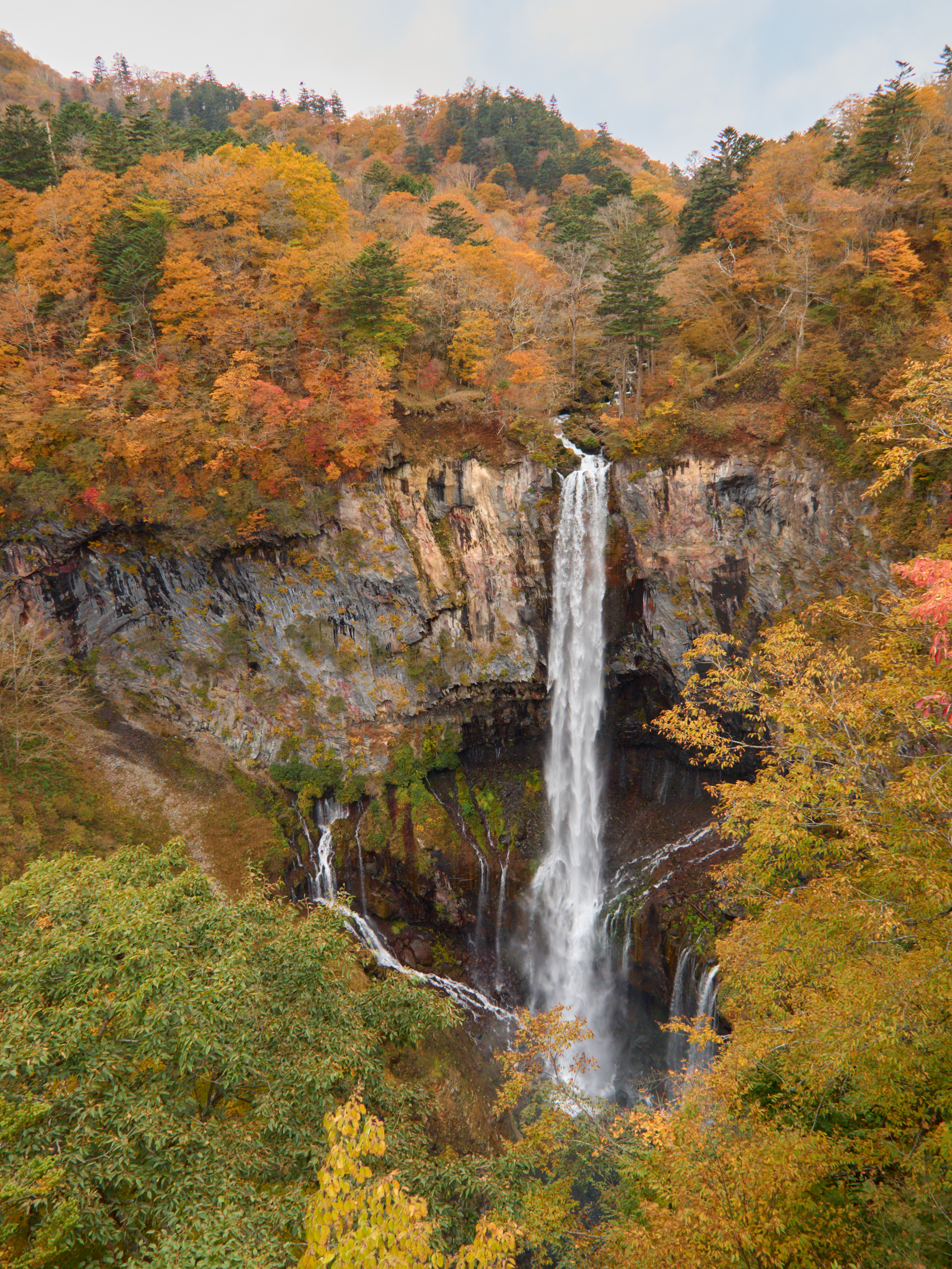
Kegon Falls in autumn.

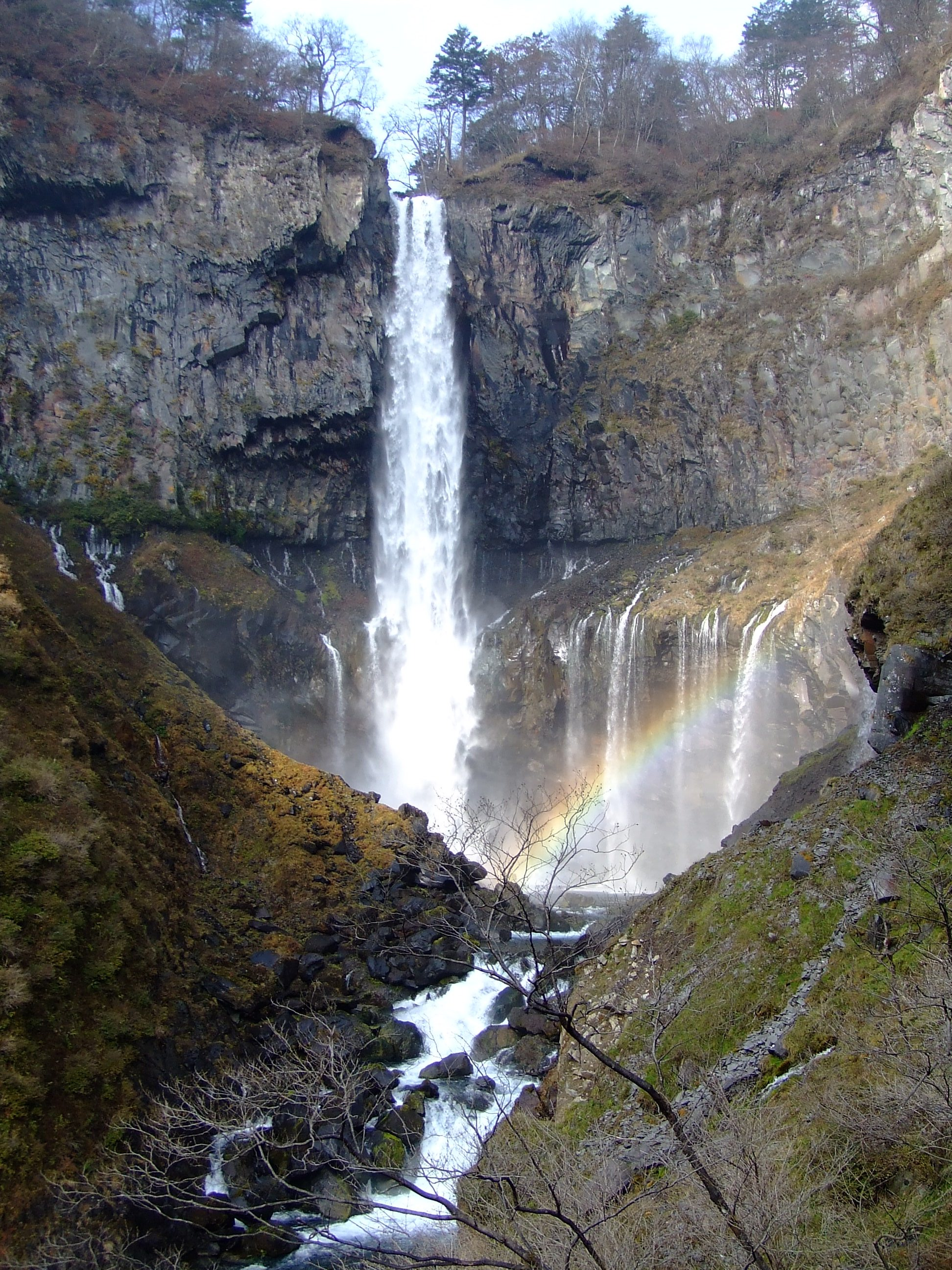
Kegon Falls

Kegon Falls in autumn

Video of the Kegon Falls in winter

Video of the Kegon Falls in summer

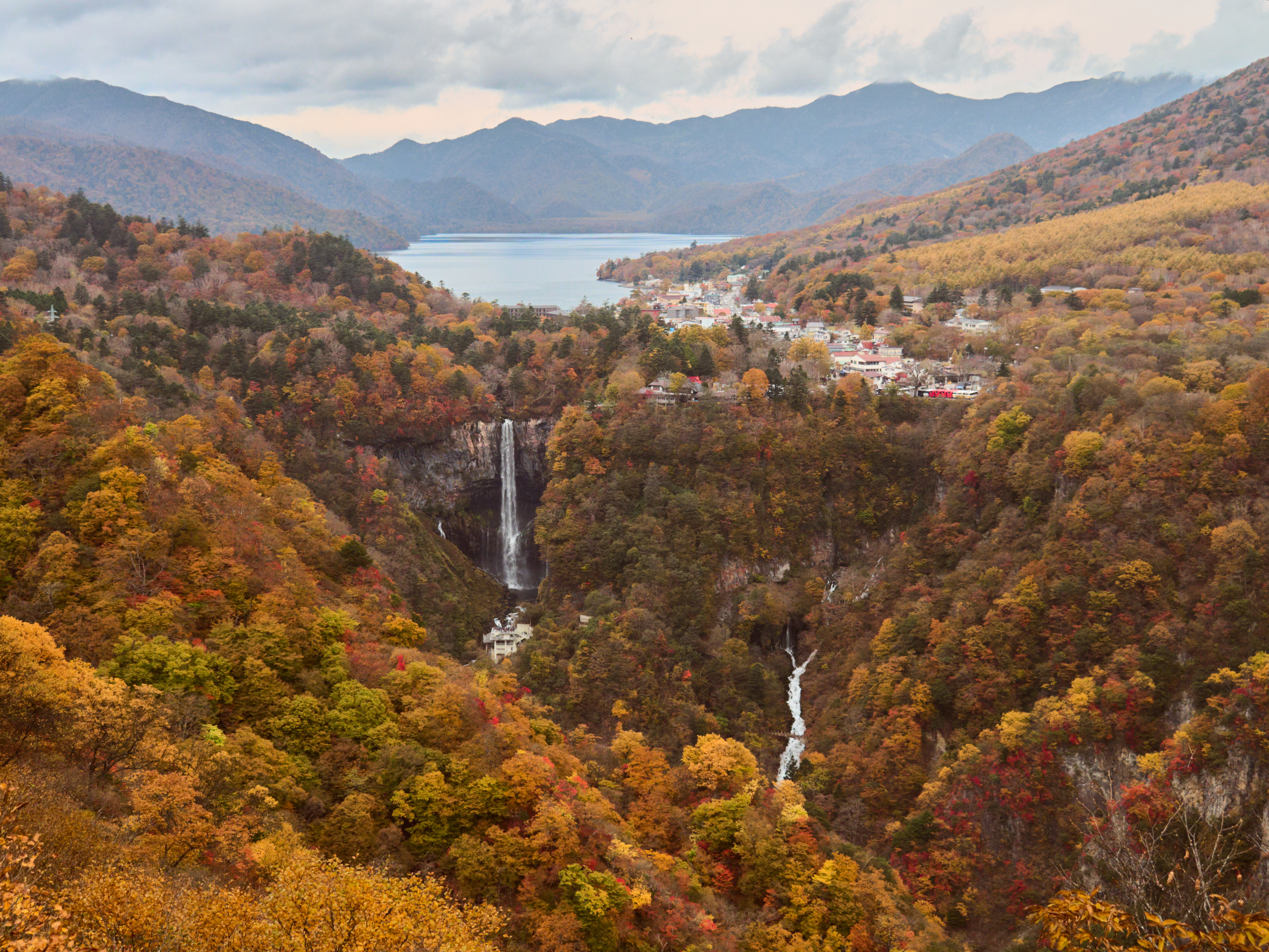
Kegon Falls dropping into a forested valley, with Lake Chuzenji in the background.

== See also ==
- List of waterfalls
- List of waterfalls in Japan
