= Mount Shaka =

Mountain in Fukuoka Prefecture, Japan

- Location within Japan

Highest point
- Prominence: 1,230 m (4,040 ft)
- Coordinates: 33°11′15″N 130°53′20″E

Naming
- Native name: 釈迦岳 (Japanese)

Geography
- Location: Hita, Ōita Prefecture and Yame, Fukuoka Prefecture
- Country: Japan

Mount Shaka (釈迦岳, Shaka-dake), located in Hita, Ōita Prefecture and Yame, Fukuoka Prefecture, Japan, is the highest mountain in Fukuoka Prefecture, with a summit elevation of 1,230 m (4,035 ft 5 in). Although Fugen-dake is the highest peak of the mountain with a summit elevation of 1,231 m (4,038 ft 9 in), Honshaka, a peak located at the border of the two prefectures, is what is commonly referred to as Mount Shaka.

== Overview ==
The mountain summit has a large flat top and the Emperor Keikō Monument. The south side of the summit is a vertical cliff that goes down all the way to the valley. From the summit, it is possible to see Mount Kujū, Mount Hane, Mount Aso in Kumamoto Prefecture, and as far as Ariake Sea on the west side of Kyushu.

The Fugen-dake peak of the mountain, in Ōita Prefecture, is connected with a road and has a radome.

== Mountain climbing ==
The Shaka-dake Gozen-dake Jūsō Course is a 7.4 km (4.6 mi) climbing course that takes about 4 hours and 40 minutes to finish.

== See also ==
- List of Japanese prefectures by highest mountain
