= Ryūzu Falls =

- 竜頭の滝
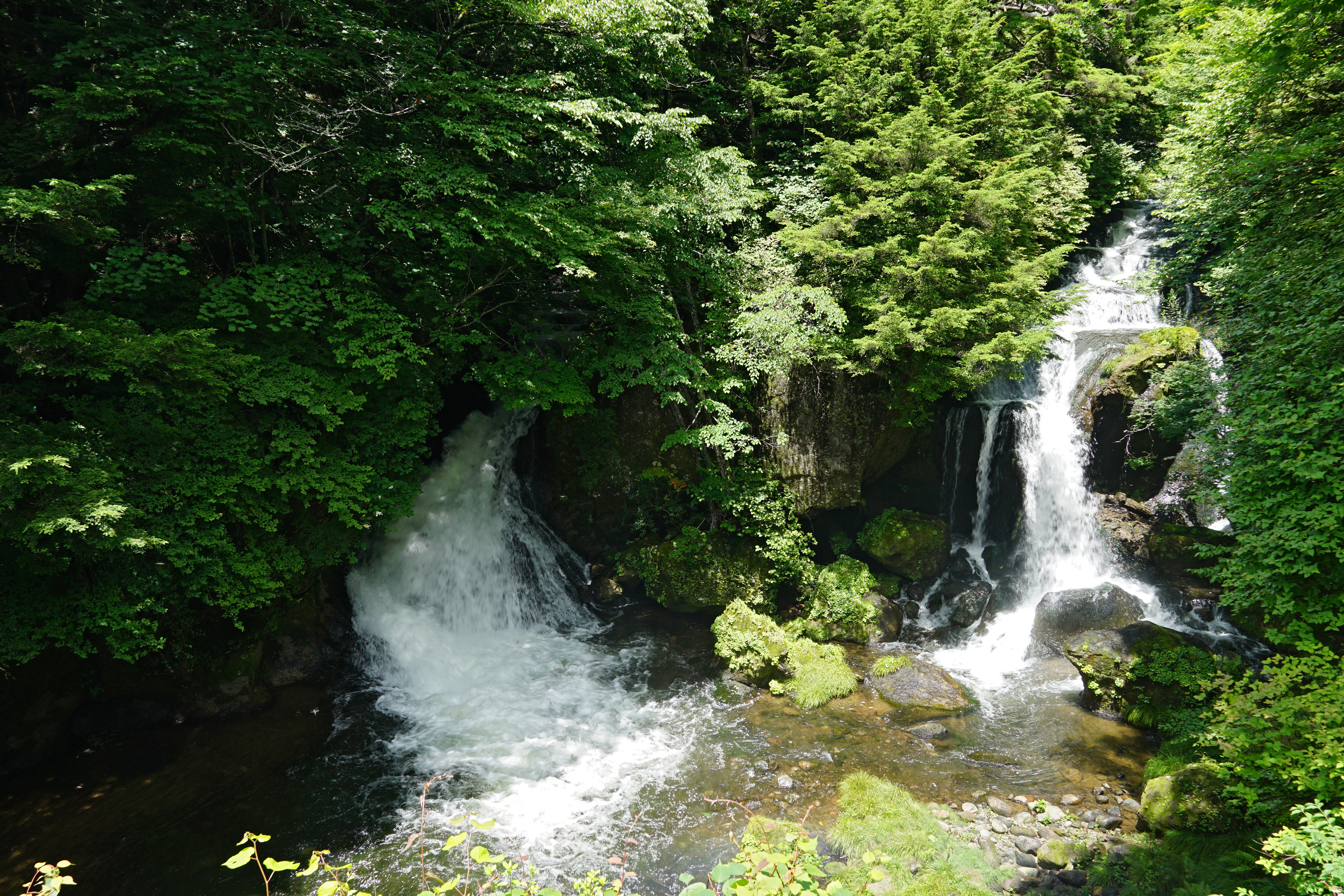
- The lower stream of Ryūzu Falls.

- Location within Japan
- Location: Nikkō, Tochigi, Japan
- Coordinates: 36°45′33″N 139°27′5″E
- Total height: 60 m (200 ft)
- Average width: 10 m (33 ft)
- Watercourse: Yukawa River

Ryūzu Falls (龍頭滝, -taki, lit. "Dragon's Head Waterfall") is a waterfall located upstream from the Yukawa River which makes its way into Lake Yunoko and Lake Chūzenji. It is located near Nikkō in Tochigi Prefecture, Japan.

Ryūzu can be translated as 'Dragon's Head', and is so named because its twin falls are said to resemble a dragon's head.

The middle stream of Ryūzu Falls.

Near the upper end of the Ryūzu Falls stream. Taken from Ryuzu Bridge.

Near the upper end of the Ryūzu Falls stream.

In winter.
(3 February 2024)

In winter.
(12 February 2010)

== See also ==
- Mount Nantai - The volcano that formed the geology of Ryuzu Falls.
- Senjōgahara - A large moor upstream from Ryuzu Falls.
- Yudaki Falls - A large waterfall located 5 km upstream from Ryuzu Falls.
