= Mount Kyō =

Mountain in Kashima, Saga Prefecture, Japan

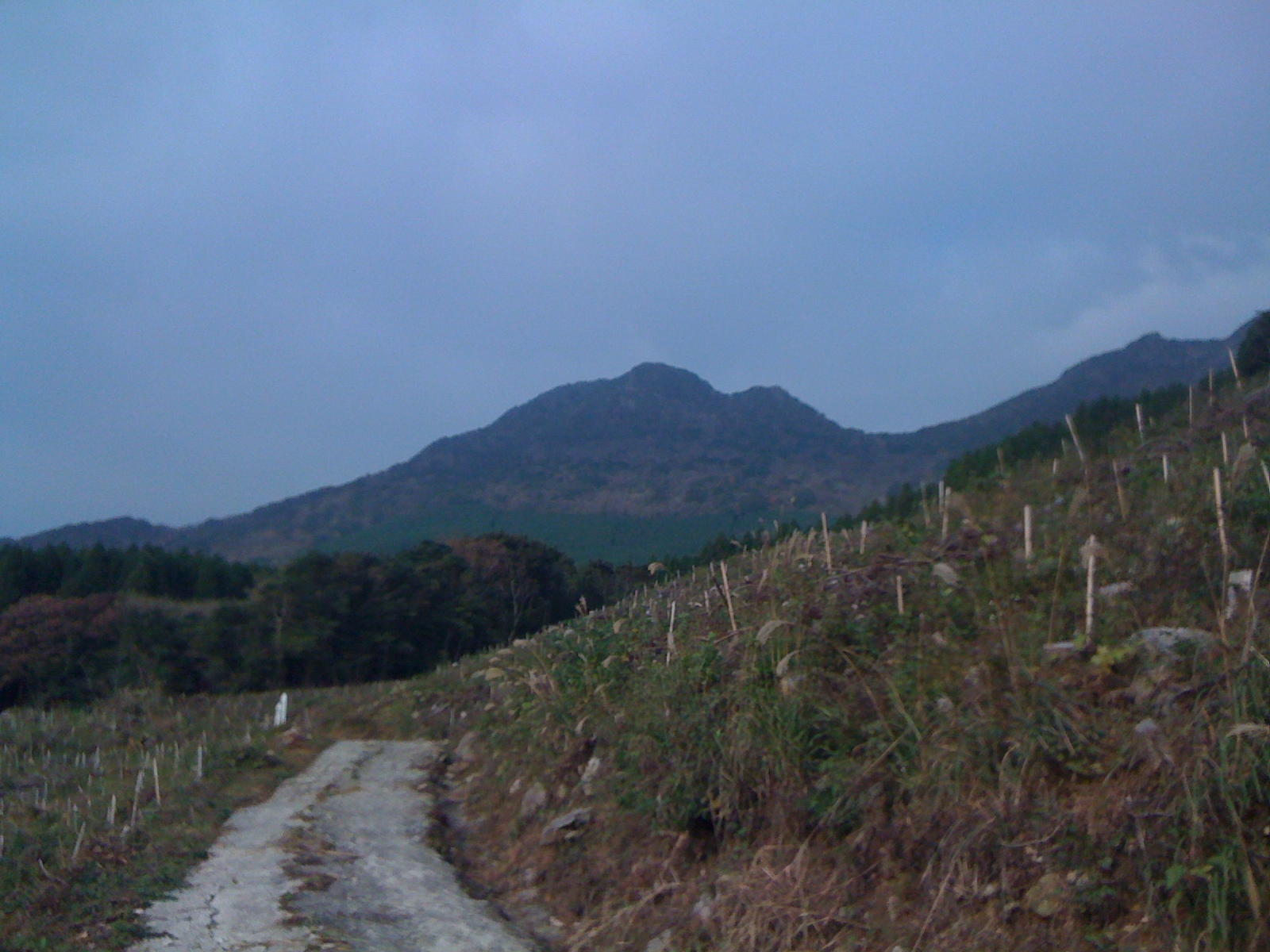
- Mount Kyō seen from the east

Highest point
- Elevation: 1,076 m (3,530 ft)
- Prominence: 1,034 m (3,392 ft)
- Listing: Ribu
- Coordinates: 32°59′15″N 130°04′35″E

Naming
- Native name: 経ヶ岳 (Japanese)

Geography
- Location within Japan
- Location: Kashima, Saga Prefecture
- Country: Japan

Geology
- Rock age: Quaternary
- Mountain type(s): Stratovolcano, lava dome

Mount Kyō (経ヶ岳, Kyōga-take), located in Kashima, Saga Prefecture, Japan, is the highest mountain in Saga Prefecture, with a summit elevation of 1,075.7 m (3,529 ft 2 in). It is a volcano and the highest mountain of the Tara volcanic mountain range. The highlands around Mount Kyō and Mount Tara have been designated as a prefectural park, the Mount Tara Natural Park.

== Mountain climbing ==
The mountain is popular for its advanced mountain climbing course. The climbing course begins from Okuhiratani, is 3 km long (1.9 mi), and climbing to the summit takes about 2 and half hours. It is possible to see Mount Unzen of Shimabara Peninsula, the Ariake Sea, and as far as Mount Aso in Kumamoto Prefecture from the summit.

The Okuhiratani Camping Site is situated in front of the entrance to the climbing route and has lodging facilities.

== Nature ==
The mountain is covered in natural oak forest with momi fir and tsuga trees. The mountain also has sugi and hinoki planted forest. Shakunaga, tsutsuji and kousa flowers bloom between the months of May and June in the mountain.

The forests on the mountain are designated as Headwaters Conservation Forest and Public Health Forest.

== See also ==
- List of Japanese prefectures by highest mountain
