= Lake Chūzenji =

Lake in Nikkō, Kantō region, Japan

- 中禅寺湖 (Japanese)
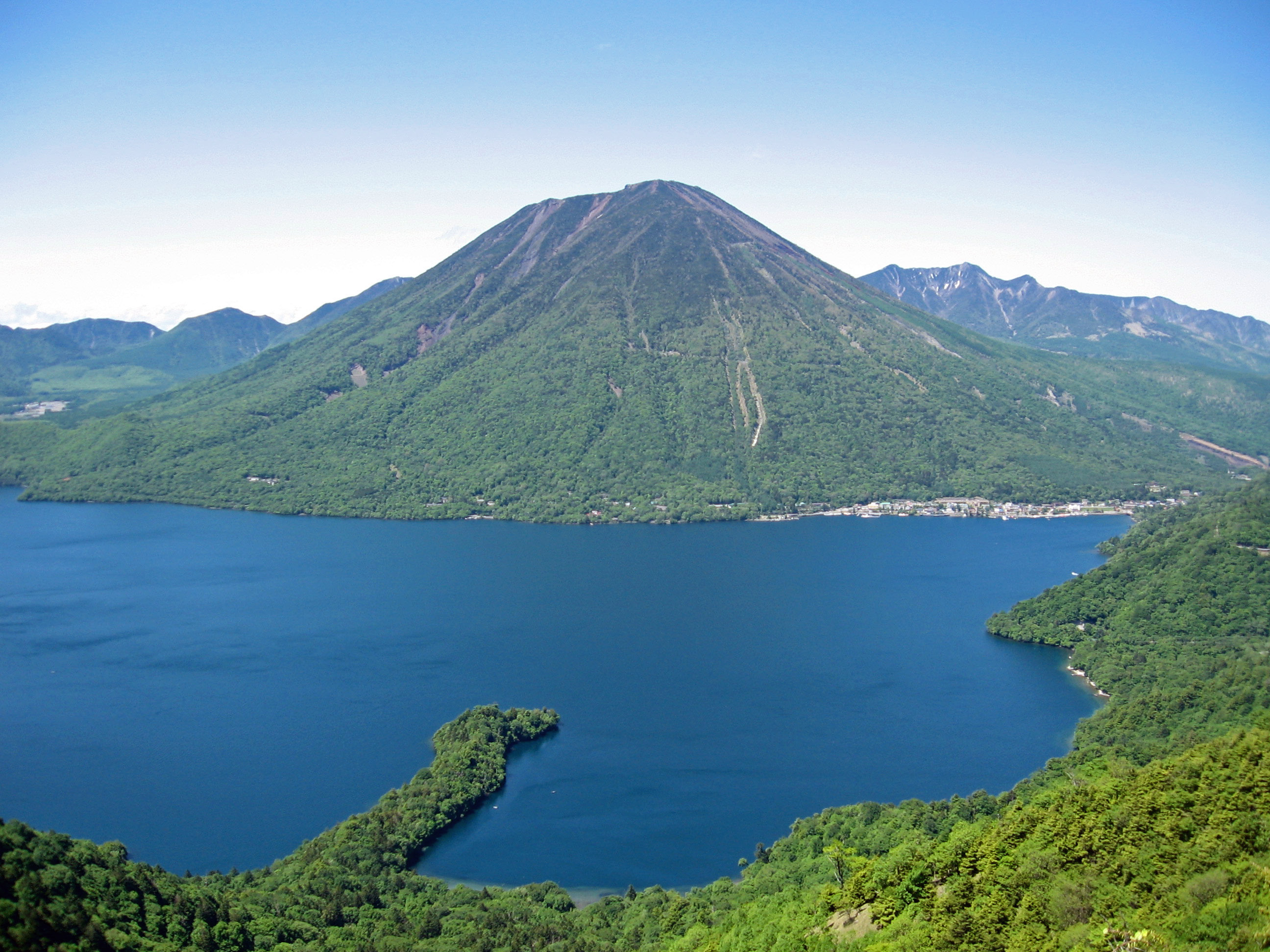
- Lake and Mt. Nantai

- Location within Japan
- Location: Nikkō National Park, Nikkō, Tochigi
- Coordinates: 36°44′26″N 139°27′44″E
- Primary inflows: Kegon Falls
- Primary outflows: Daiya River
- Basin countries: Japan
- Max. length: 1.8 km (1.1 mi)
- Max. width: 6.5 km (4.0 mi)
- Surface area: 11.62 km^{2} (4.49 sq mi)
- Average depth: 163 m (535 ft)
- Max. depth: 172 m (564 ft)
- Surface elevation: 1,269 m (4,163 ft)

Lake Chūzenji (中禅寺湖, Chūzenji-ko), also called Sea of Happiness, is a scenic lake in Nikkō National Park in the city of Nikkō, Tochigi Prefecture, Japan. It was created 20,000 years ago when Mount Nantai (2484 m) erupted and blocked the river.

The lake has a surface area of 11.62 km^{2} and a circumference of 25 km. Its elevation at the surface is 1,269 m (4,124 ft), and the water reaches a depth of 163 m (508 ft). The Yukawa River is the principal source of water. It drains through the Kegon Falls.

Chuzenji Lake was discovered in 782 by a priest named Shōdō when his group succeeded in climbing Mt. Nantai. Considered sacred, the mountain was closed to women, horses, and cows until 1872. In the middle of the Meiji period and early Showa period, many European embassies built vacation houses around the lake. The former Italian villa has been renewed and is now open to visitors. Other sites around the lake include Futara Shrine built in 790, Chuzenji Temple, and Kegon Falls.

In spring, cherry blossoms are blooming. In summer, people can escape the heat and enjoy bird watching and hiking. In fall, there are autumn leaves and in winter, there is the Snow and Ice Festival, plus winter sports like skiing and skating.

The lake was a favourite summer haunt of Sir Ernest Satow when he was Britain's envoy in Japan from 1895 to 1900, as his diaries of that time attest. He constructed a house by the lake which was used as a villa by the British Embassy for over a century.

== Overview ==
Lake Chuzenji is presumed to have the oldest brown trout population in Japan. It is also a source of water for some adjacent springs, and at least around 1981 had an abundant amount of Monodiamesa sp. and Orthocladius chuzesextus at the littoral zone.

== Views of Lake Chūzenji ==
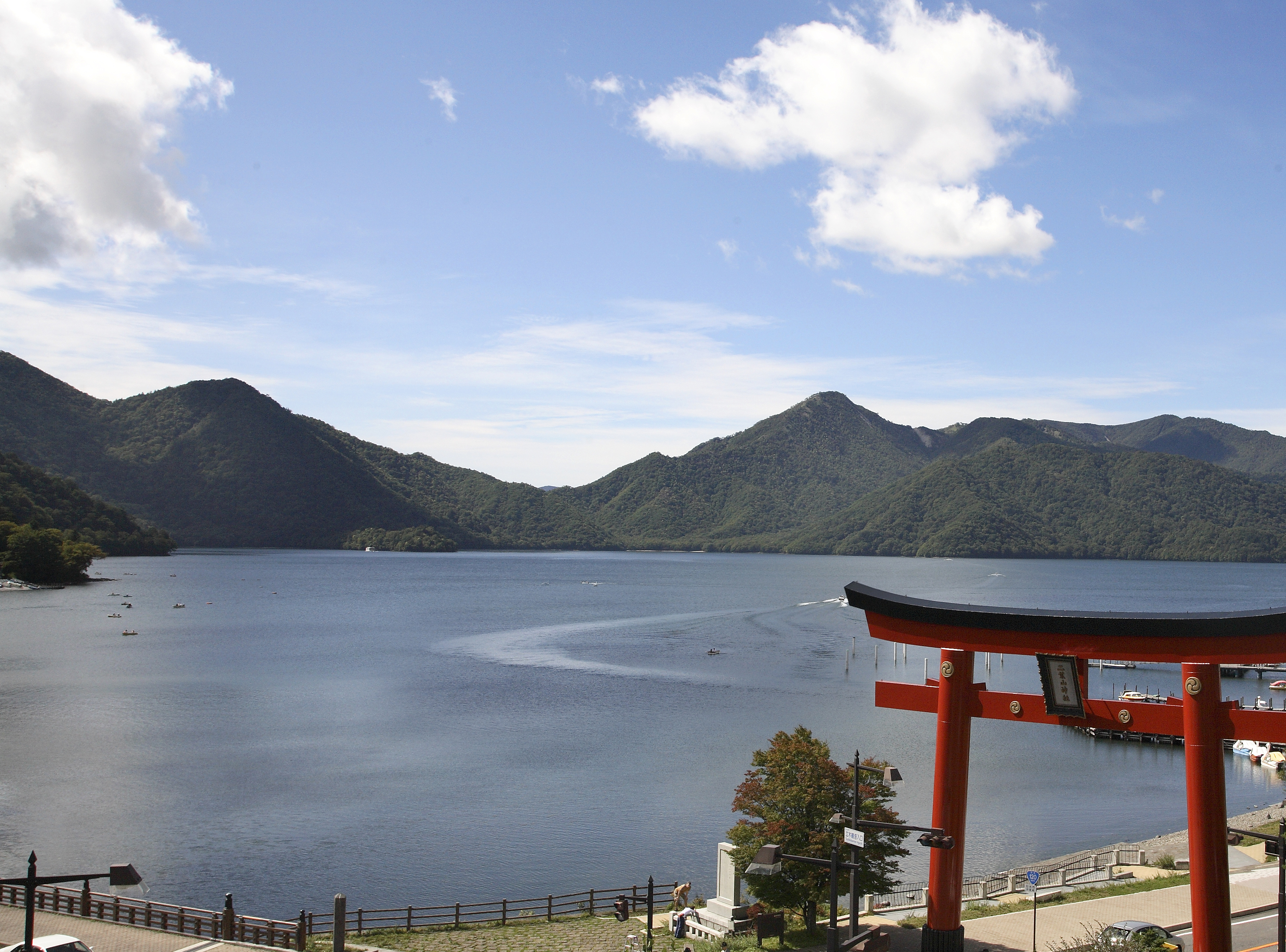
View from hotel Hana-an

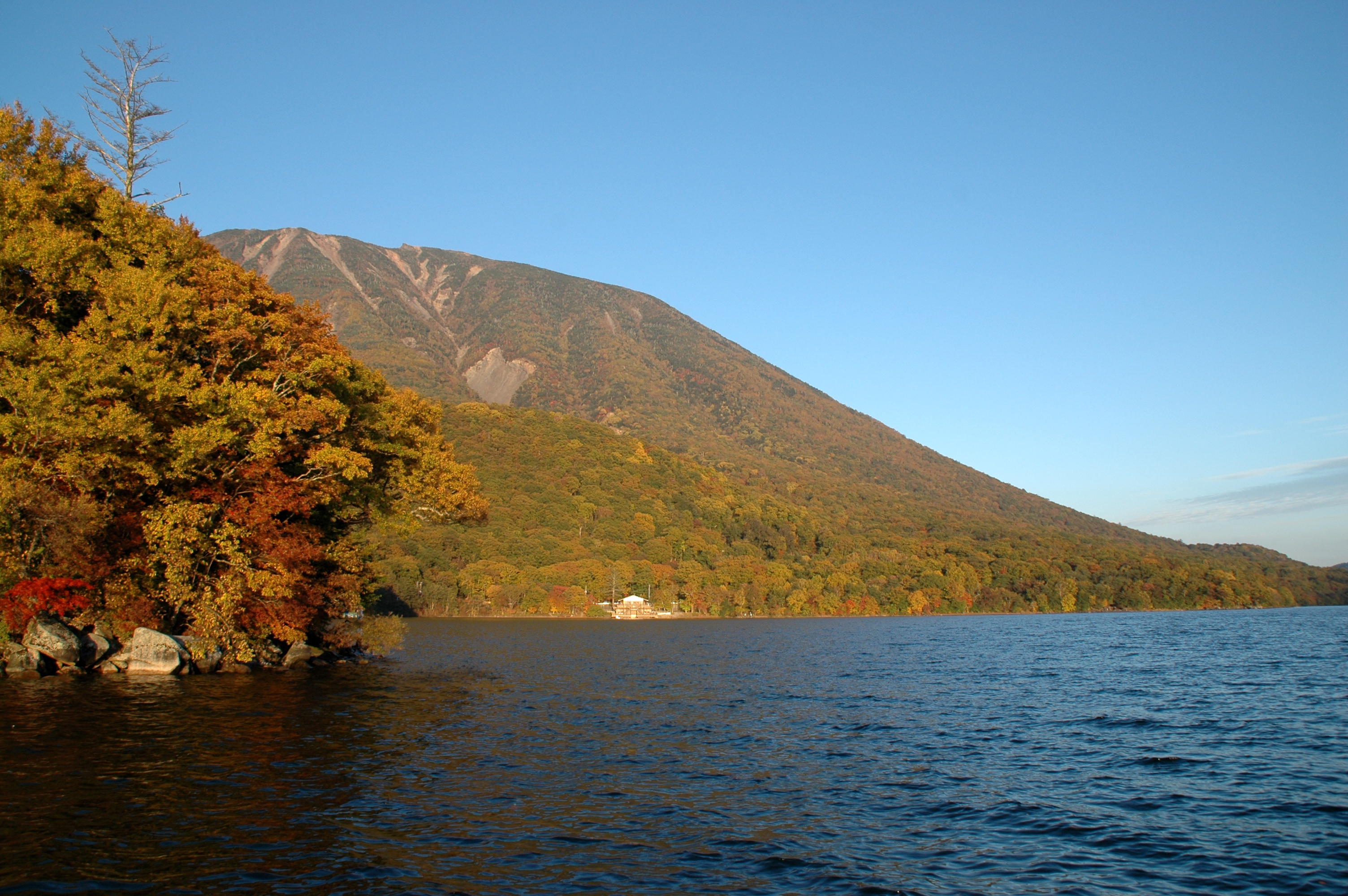
Fall colors at the lake

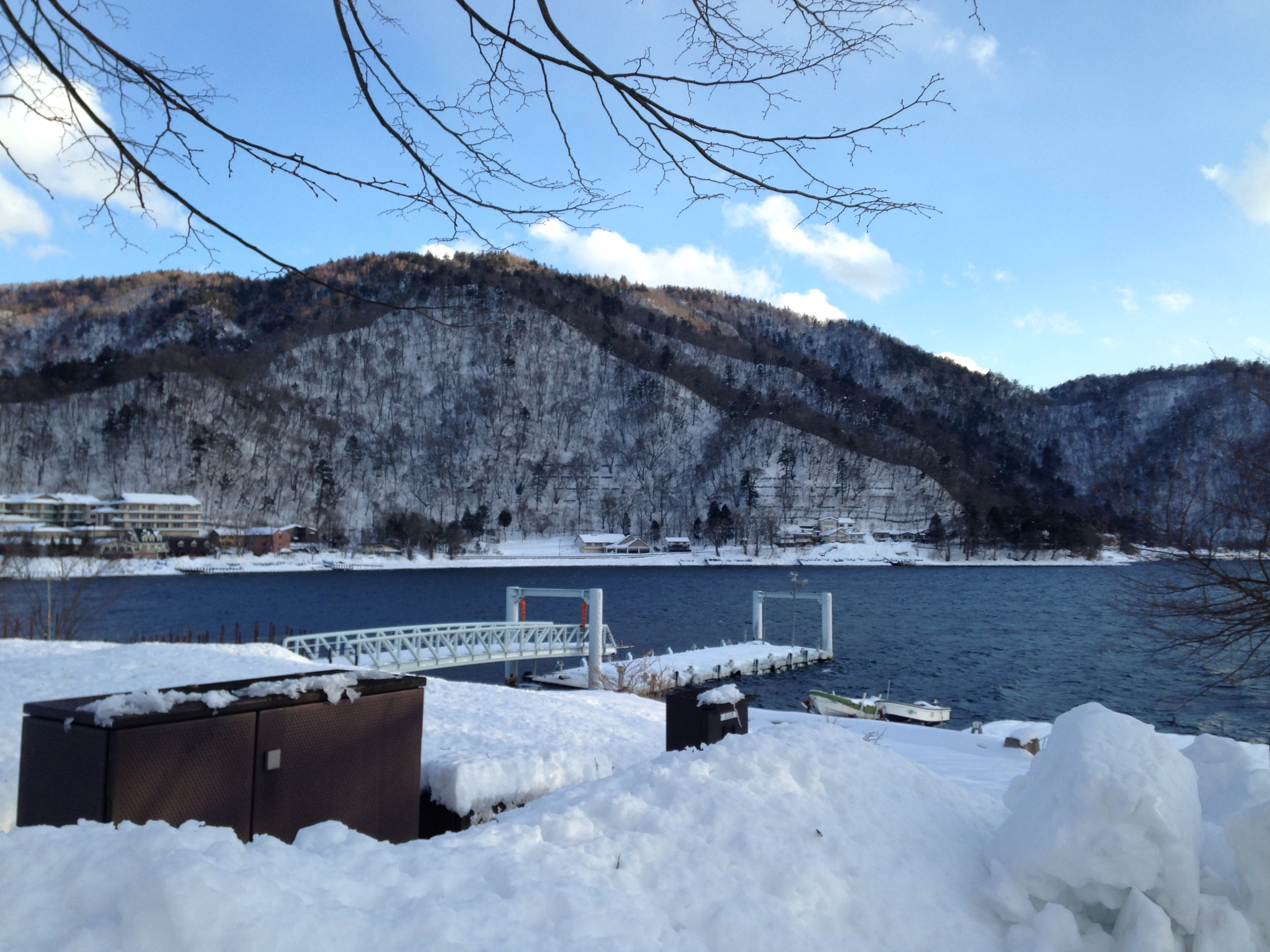
Winter at the lake

Sunny view of the lake

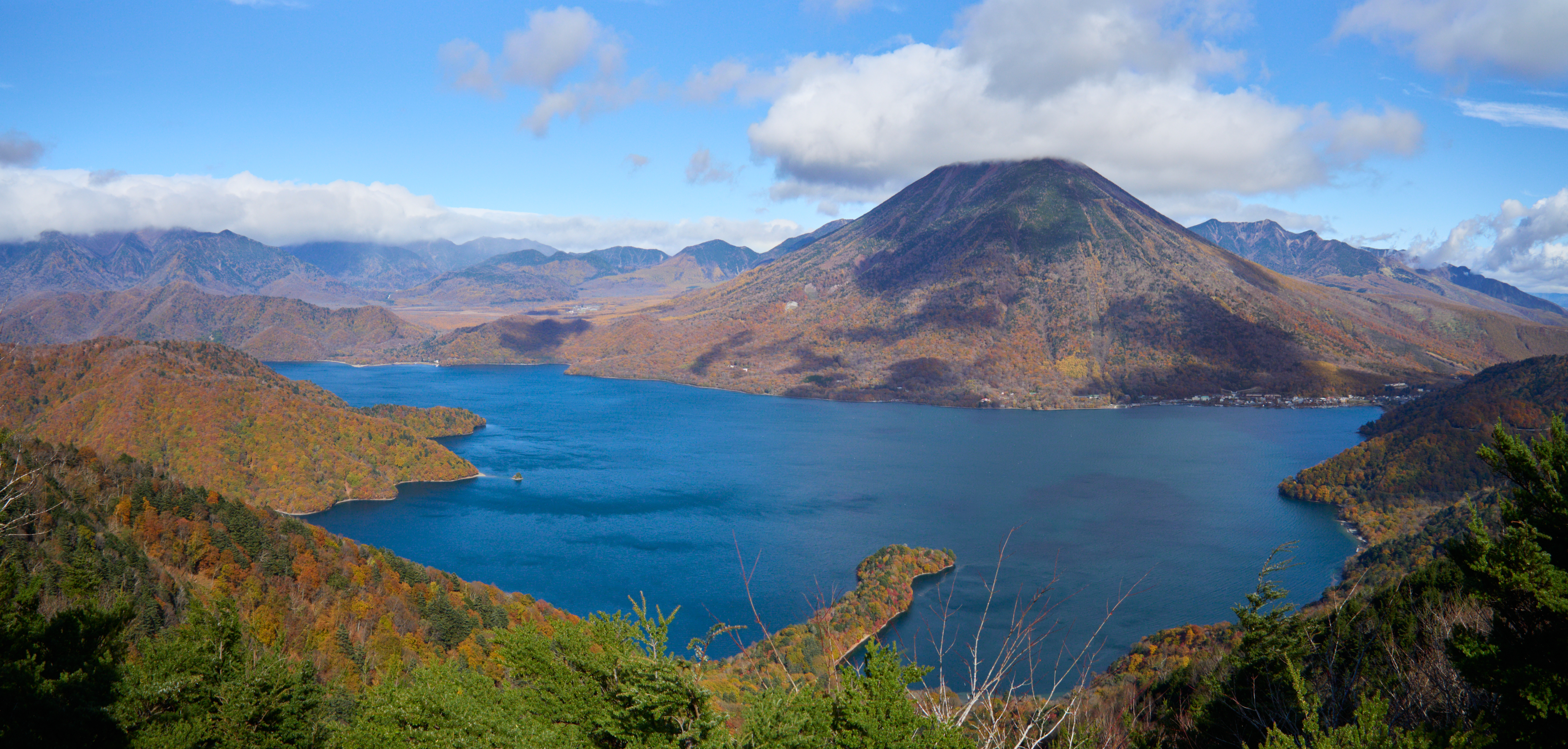
Lake Chuzenji and Mount Nantai in autumn

== Sources ==
- Encyclopædia Britannica, Lake Chūzenji, accessed on September 20, 2009.
- The Diaries of Sir Ernest Satow, British Minister in Tokyo (1895-1900), edited by Ian Ruxton, lulu.com, 2003.
