= Mount Kunimi =

Mount Kunimi may refer to:

- Mount Kunimi (Kanagawa)
- Mount Kunimi (Daikō)
