= Mount Sanpō =

Mountain in the Okuchichibu Mountains, Japan

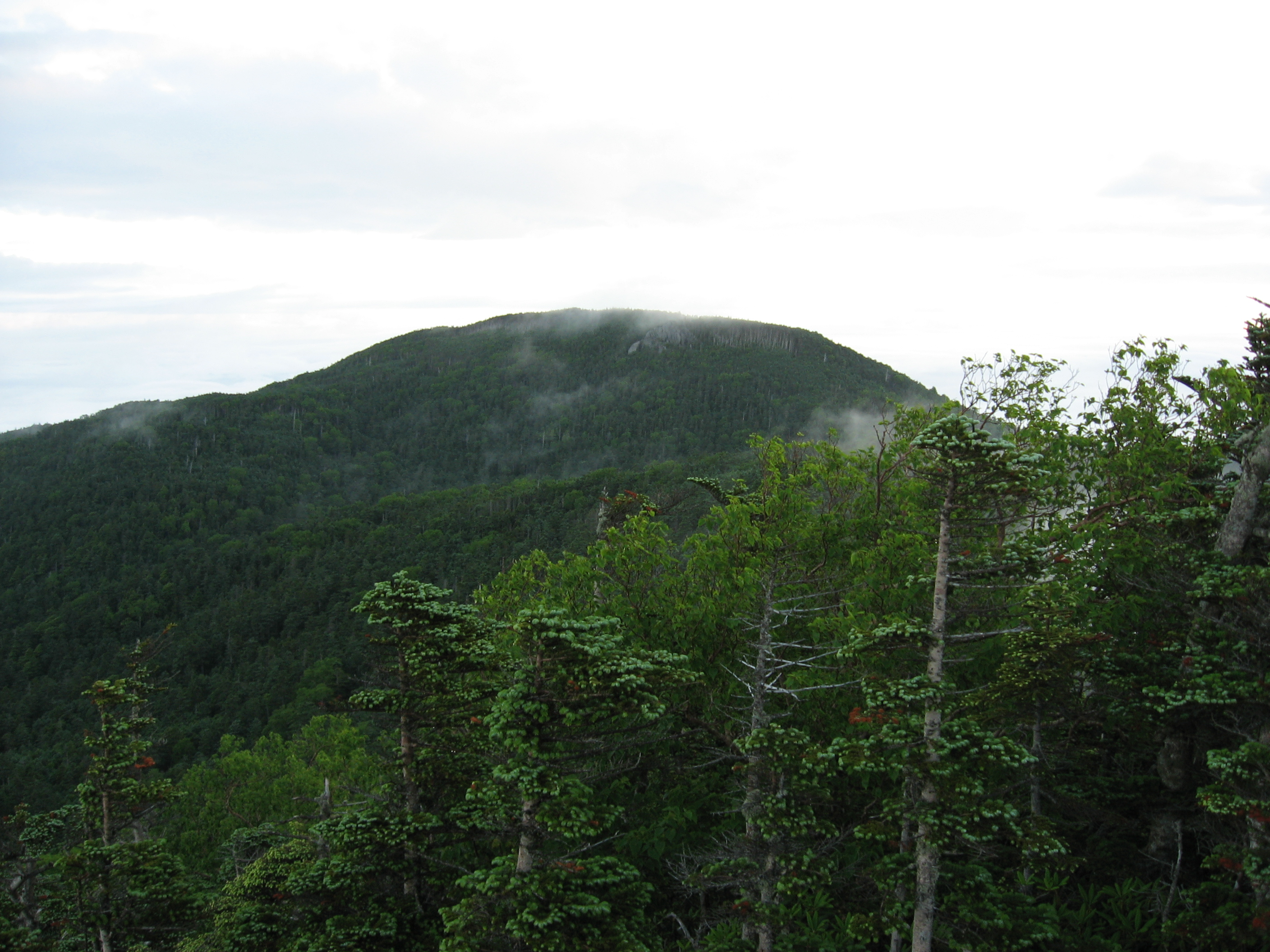
- Mount Sanpō from Mount Kobushigatake

Highest point
- Elevation: 2,483 m (8,146 ft)
- Prominence: 324 m (1,063 ft)
- Coordinates: 35°55′03″N 138°43′40″E

Geography
- Location within Japan
- Location: Honshu, Japan
- Parent range: Okuchichibu Mountains

Mount Sanpō (三宝山, Sanpō-yama) is a mountain on the border between Chichibu, Saitama and Kawakami, Nagano in the Okuchichibu Mountains of Japan. At a height of 2,483 m (8,146 ft), it is the highest point in Saitama.
