= Mount Nikkō-Shirane =

Stratovolcano on the island of Honshu in Japan

- 日光白根山
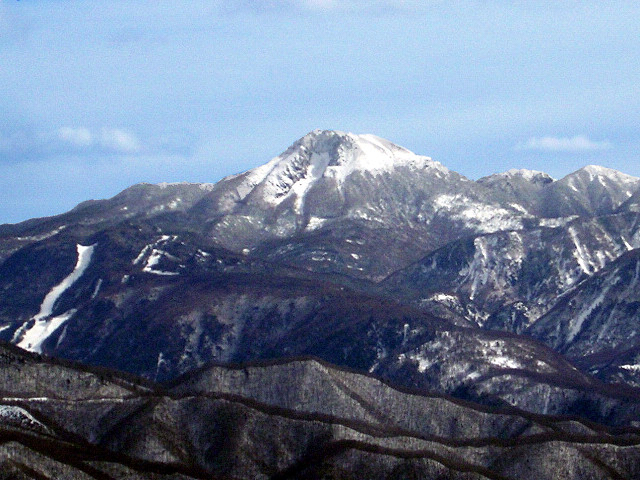

Highest point
- Elevation: 2,579 m (8,461 ft)
- Prominence: 1,613 m (5,292 ft)
- Listing: Ultra, Ribu; List of volcanoes in Japan
- Coordinates: 36°47′54″N 139°22′27″E

Geography
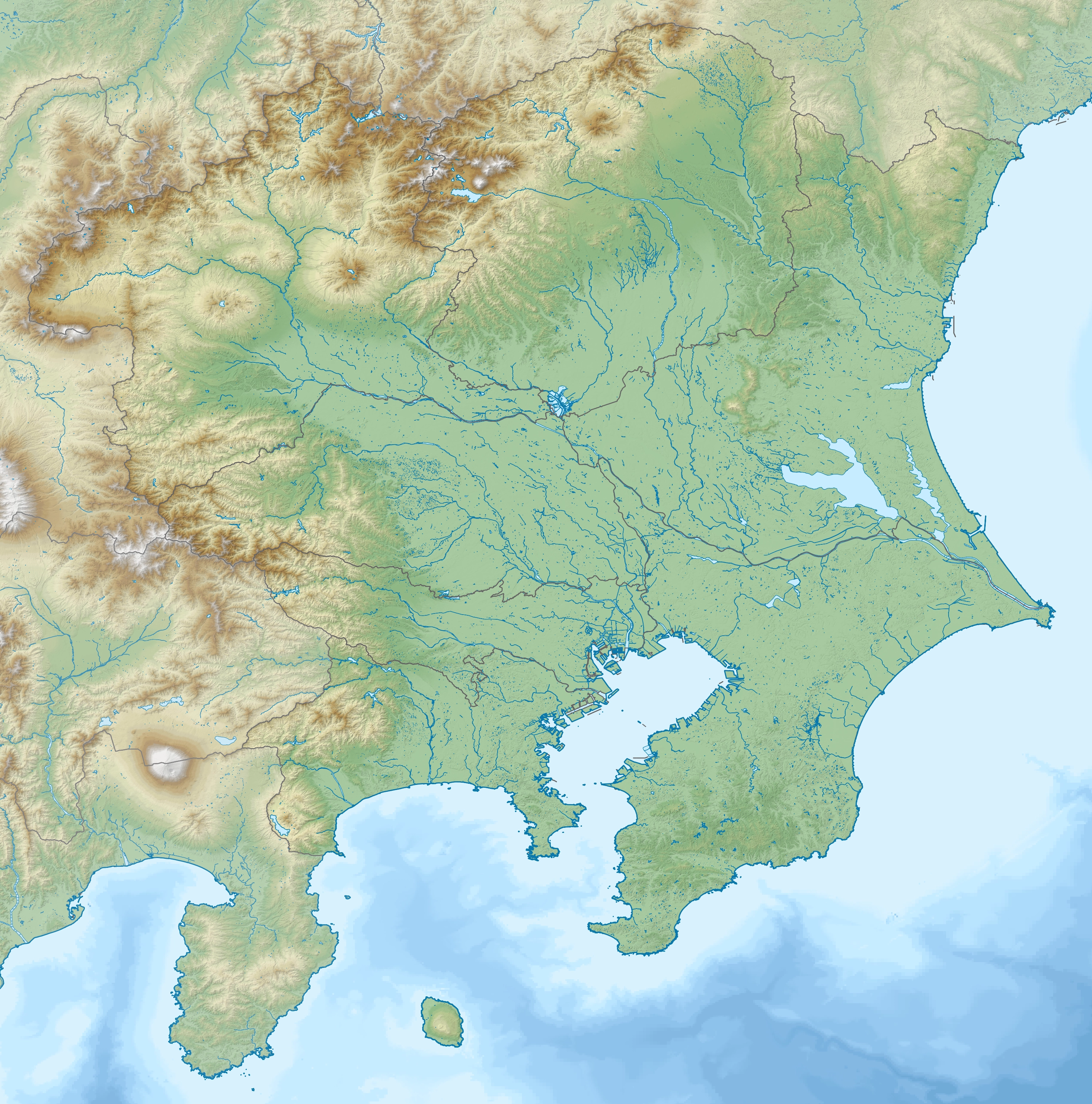
- Location within Kanto Area Location within Japan
- Location: Kanto, Japan
- Topo map: Geospatial Information Authority 25000:1 男体山

Geology
- Mountain type(s): Lava dome, Lava flow
- Volcanic arc: Northeastern Japan Arc
- Last eruption: July to September 1952

Mount Nikkō-Shirane
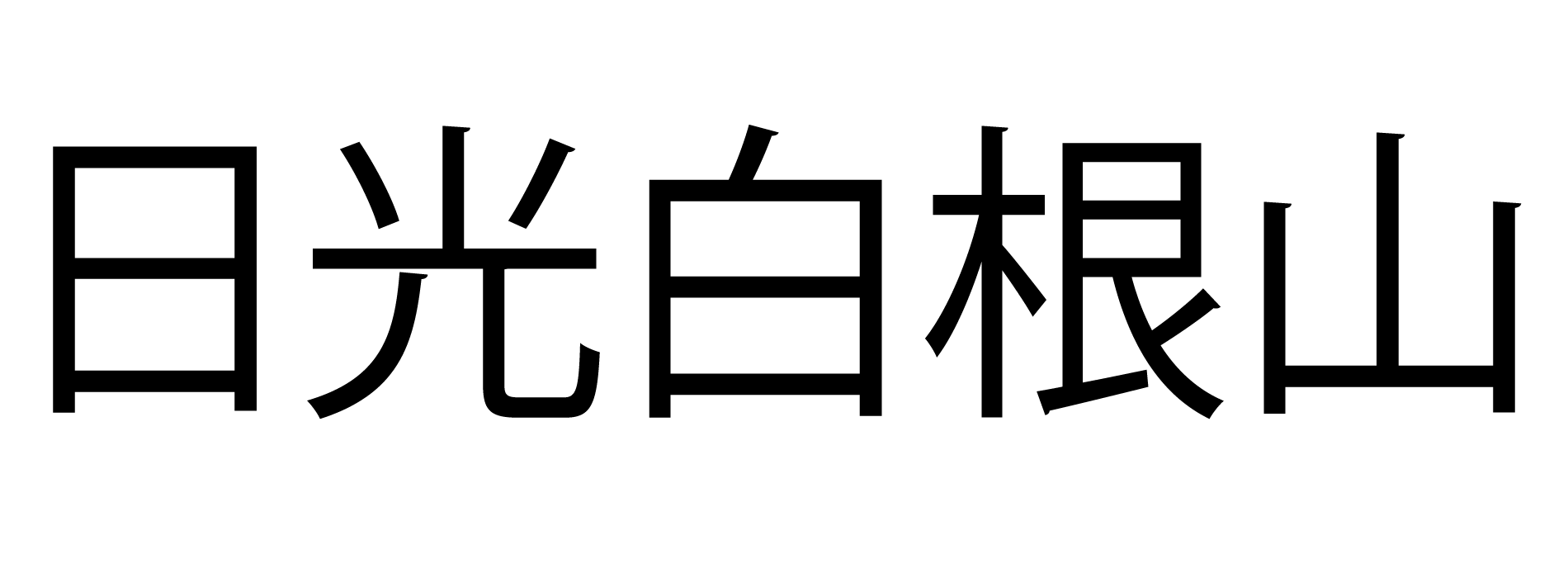
- "Mt. Nikkō-Shirane" in kanji

Japanese name
- Kanji: 日光白根山
Transcriptions
- Romanization: Nikkō-Shirane-san

Mount Nikkō-Shirane (日光白根山, Nikkō-Shirane-san) is a stratovolcano in the Nikkō National Park in central Honshū, the main island of Japan. It stands at 2,578 m high. It is the highest mountain in north eastern Japan (no higher mountains exist in the east or north of this mountain). Its peak (Mt Okushirane) is a Lava dome of andesite. Mt Nikkō-Shirane is listed in the 100 famous mountains in Japan proposed by Kyuya Fukada and also of one of the famous mountains of Tochigi and Gunma prefectures respectively.

It should not be confused with Mount Kusatsu-Shirane elsewhere in Gunma Prefecture. It is located at the boundary between Nikko City, Tochigi Prefecture and Katashina Village, Tone County Gunma Prefecture.

Mt. Nikko Shirane is surrounded by the mountains of the Shirane volcano (Neogene volcano) and is often hidden by clouds throughout the year. From the Kanto Plain only the dome-shaped (Quaternary volcano) summit is visible.

In winter if the weather conditions permit, the white snow fields on the darker surroundings slopes can make the mountain and peak appear exceptionally white.

Its peak is the highest point in both Tochigi and Gunma Prefectures

The area around Shirane Volcano is designated as Nikko National Park in which there are various natural features such as Goshiki pond, Yuno lake, Yu falls, Senjo moor, and Odashiro moor. Being a designated national park, the alpine plants and vegetation are protected.

The plant Sycamore mallow, which naturally appears on this mountain, can hardly be seen at the present time, with the withering of these plants also in the surrounding mountains, which is caused by air pollutants coming from the Tokyo metropolitan area.

== Etymology ==
"Shirane" means a white mountain covered with snow, hence such name can be found in many places in Japan. In order to distinguish this mountain from other "Shirane", this mountain is called "Nikkō-Shirane".

Its name in Japanese is written 白根 (shira-ne) which are the characters for white and root respectively. The peak Okushirane is written 奥白根 (oku-shirane) means deepest, or inner-most.

Whilst there are many mountains in Japan with a similar name, in the 1 / 25,000 topographic map "Mt. Nantai" published by the Geospatial Information Authority of Japan, only Mt. Shirane is described.

== Volcanic history and activity ==
The mountain has been selected by the Volcanic Eruption Prediction Council as a volcano that requires a complete monitoring and observation system for volcanic disaster prevention.

It is a volcano that has a depression due to erosion between Mt. Shirane and Mt. Goshiki, which are composed of old Neogene volcanic rocks around the highest peak, Mt. Okushirane. This is a newly formed lava dome where there are mountains of the Shirane volcano group such as Maeshirane, Goshikiyama, Sotoyama, and Shiranekakuzan, which are stratovolcanoes.

About 5300 years ago, there have been several large-scale eruptions, and it is believed that there are more than four eruptions that left sediments in the vicinity.

=== Notable eruptions and seismic activity ===
- 1649 - steam eruption. Pyroclastic fall. Eruption at the summit crater. A new crater with a large amount of ash fall and a diameter of about 200m and a depth of about 10m was formed. The top shrine was completely destroyed.
- 1872 May 14 - steam eruption. An eruption occurred on the flank of the southwest slope, and a crater with a diameter of more than 200m was formed on the flank of the southwest slope.
- 1873 March 12 - steam eruption. Pyroclastic fall. Eruption location unknown.
- 1889 December 4th - steam eruption. Pyroclastic fall. Eruption at the old crater facing Ogawa Village on the western slope of Mt. Shirane.
- 1952 July-September - smoke and ring.
- 1993-95 Various times - Earthquakes and volcanic tremors. Micro-seismic activity near Lake Chuzenji and micro-seismic / tremor activity just under the summit.
- 2001 March 31-early April - Earthquake, seismic activity in the northwest to northeast of Mt. Shirane, Nikko (depth less than 5km).
- 2011 March - Earthquake. After the 2011 Tōhoku earthquake and tsunami, seismicity increased around 5km to the west and northwest, and from 5 to 10km from the east to the southeast.

== Hiking ==
The mountain is accessible from a variety of routes from both Gunma and Tochigi prefectures. The main trails to the summit are from Nikko Yumoto Onsen via Sotoyama Ridge, Tengudaira, Mae Shirane, Suganuma via Midagaga Pond, and Kinsei Pass from Goshikiyama / Midagaike. It is also possible to climb from Marunuma at the foot of the mountain to an altitude of around 2000m using the Nikko Shirane mountain ropeway, making it relatively easy to climb. Most of the regular trails are recommended to be done from mid-May until the end of October. In winter the mountain is prone to heavy snowfall and extremely cold weather. Outside the above dates it is not recommended to hike or climb unless you are an experienced climber with the proper equipment.

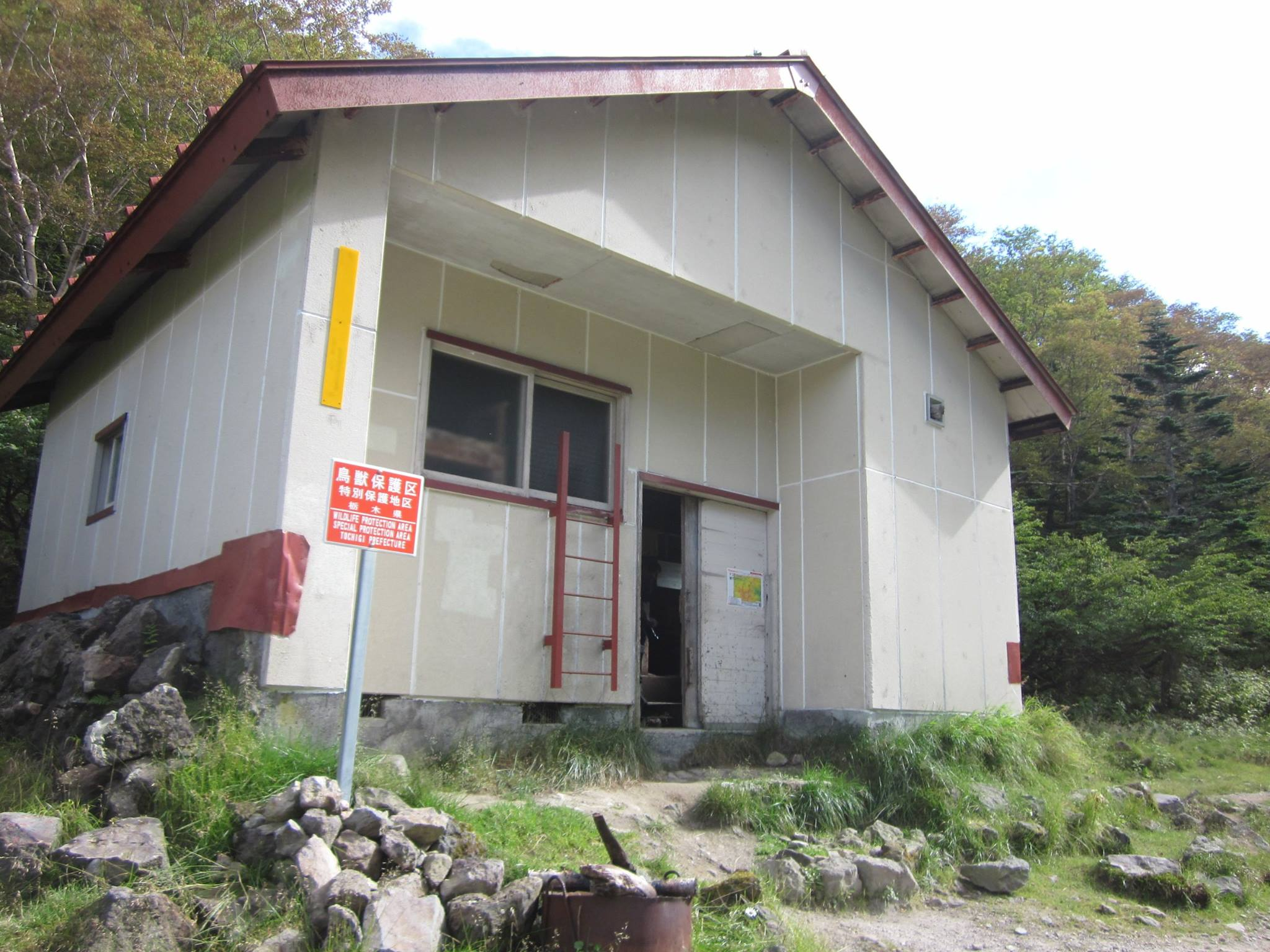
Goshiki Emergency Shelter

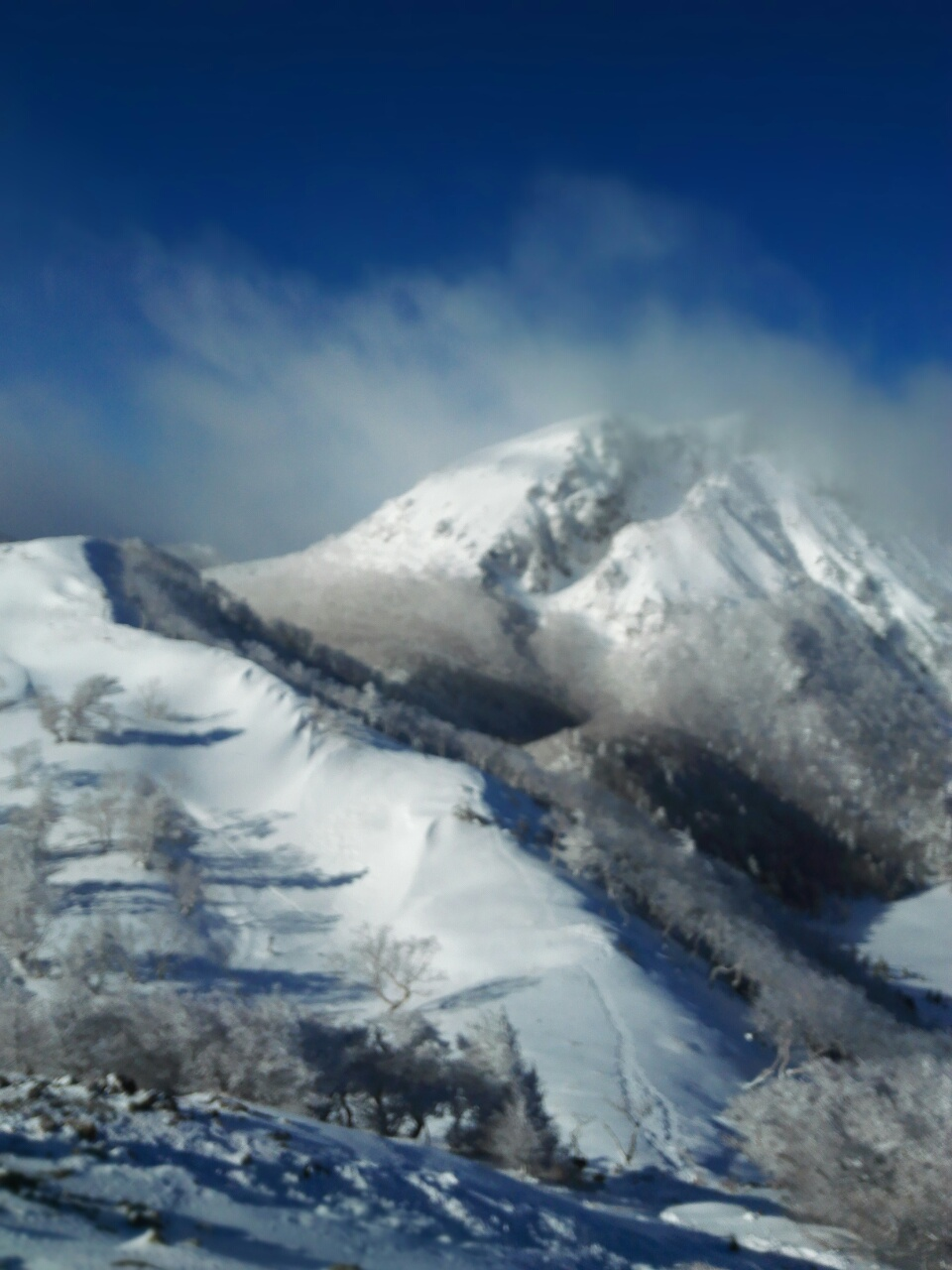
Jan 1st 2019: Winter Conditions

=== Winter climbing ===
Whilst less common and discouraged there are a number of options to hike and climb in the winter season. The most popular routes in winter are from the ski field in Yumoto via the chair lift and Mae-Shiranesan to and from the Gunma side via the Marunuma ropeway. Both are long hikes in deep snow and it is recommended to stay overnight at the emergency shelter near Goshiki-numa, about 100 metres below the summit. The 'best' winter season from mid-December to the end of April. The mountain gets the most snowfall in February. Most areas and routes are avalanche free except for the steep gullies between the main ridges, namely on the eastern side. Temperatures at or around the summit during winter can drop as low as -25°C (-13°F).

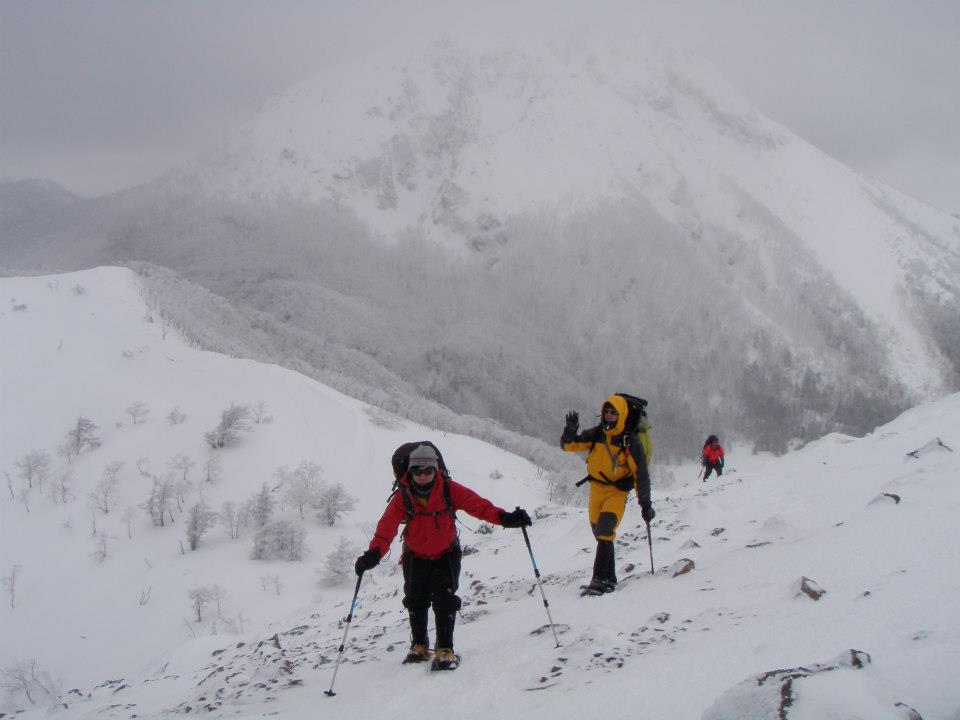
View of Okushirane from Mae-shirane

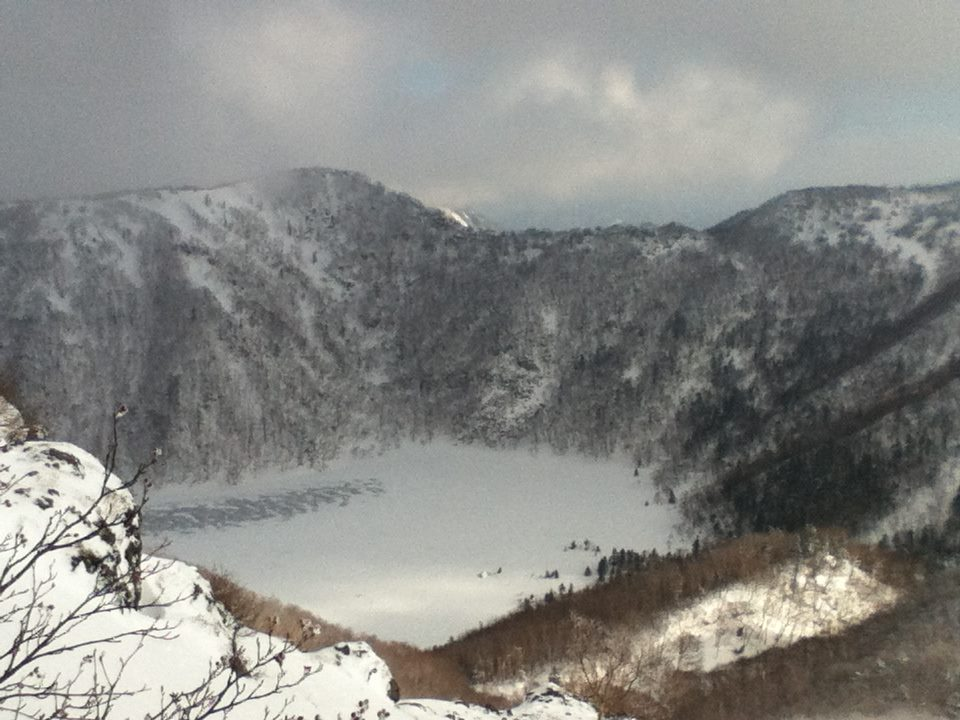
View of frozen Goshiki-numa

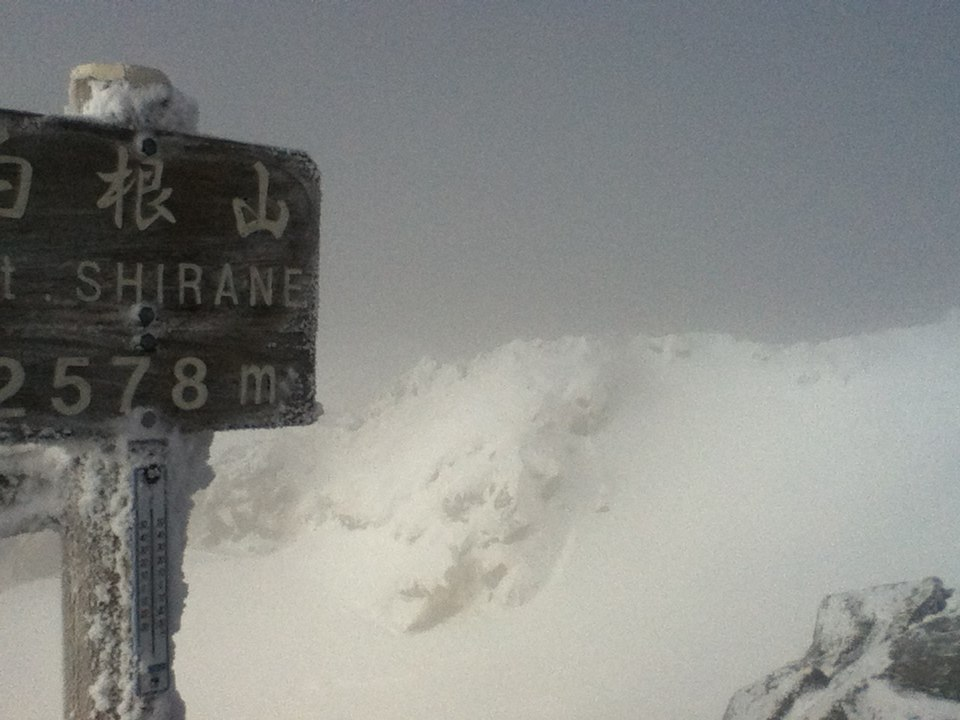
View from summit, New Year's Day 2014

=== Variation climbing ===
There is a non-map listed off-piste mixed snow/rock route that can be done all seasons which is a particular challenge in the winter. This the east ridge route (東陵). It can be reached from leaving the trail about mid-way between the emergency shelter and Goshiki-numa. After climbing the main cliff face, there is a knife ridge all the way to the summit on the right side.

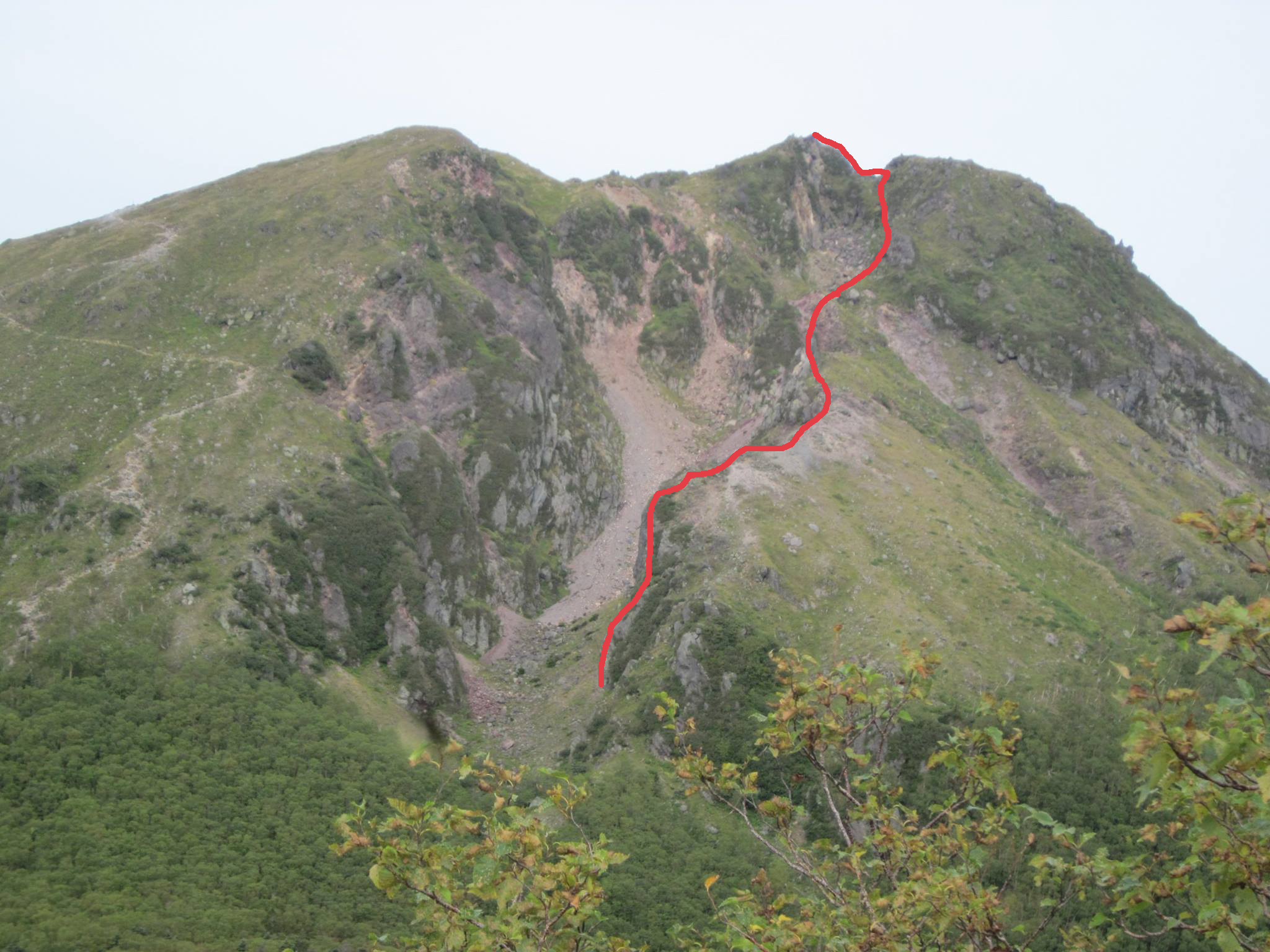
Nikko Shirane East Ridge

=== Off-Piste skiing ===
Another option in the winter is skiing a variety of off-piste routes. The recommended start is from the Marunuma Ski Fields on the Gunma side making use of the ski lift. Also possible is to ski down one of the gullies on either the side on the east or south-east ridges close to the variation climbing route. There is a chance of avalanches here due to the steepness of the gully and deep snow.

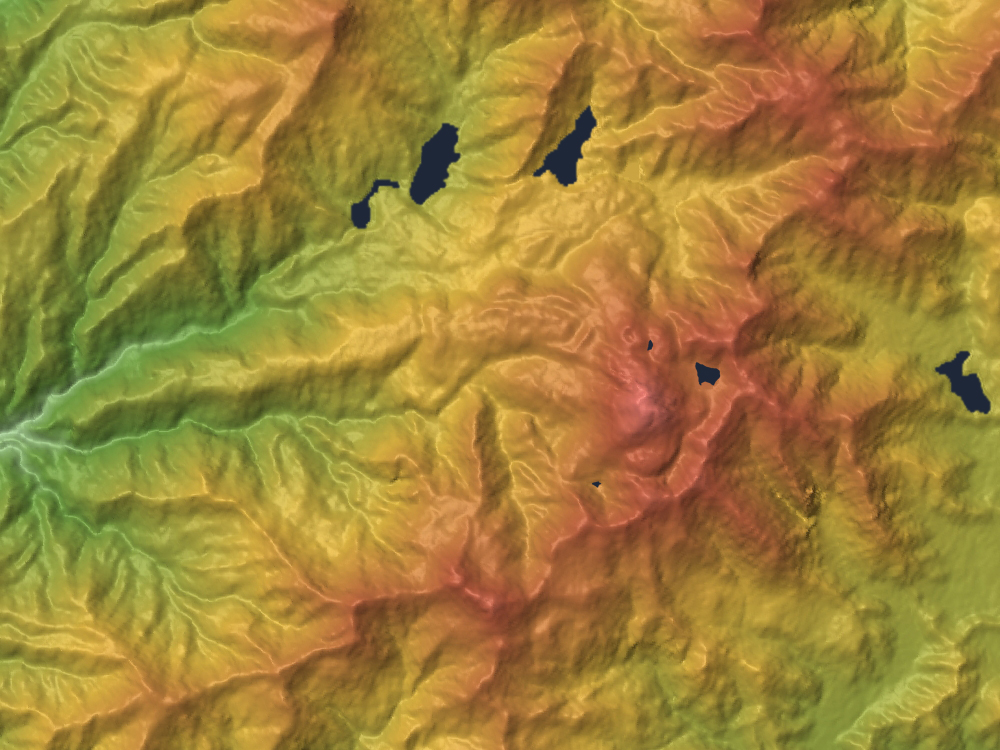
Relief Map

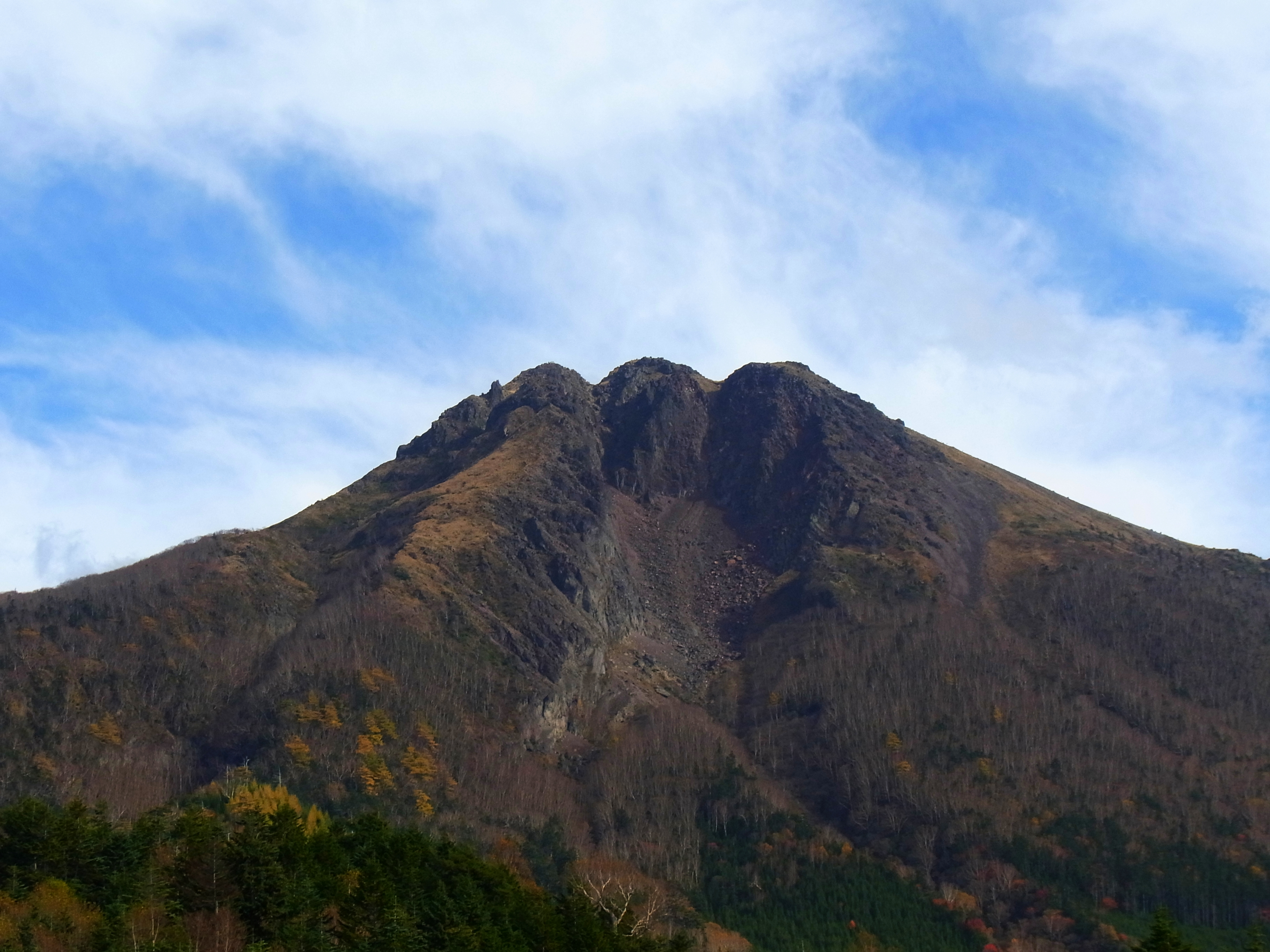
Lava dome

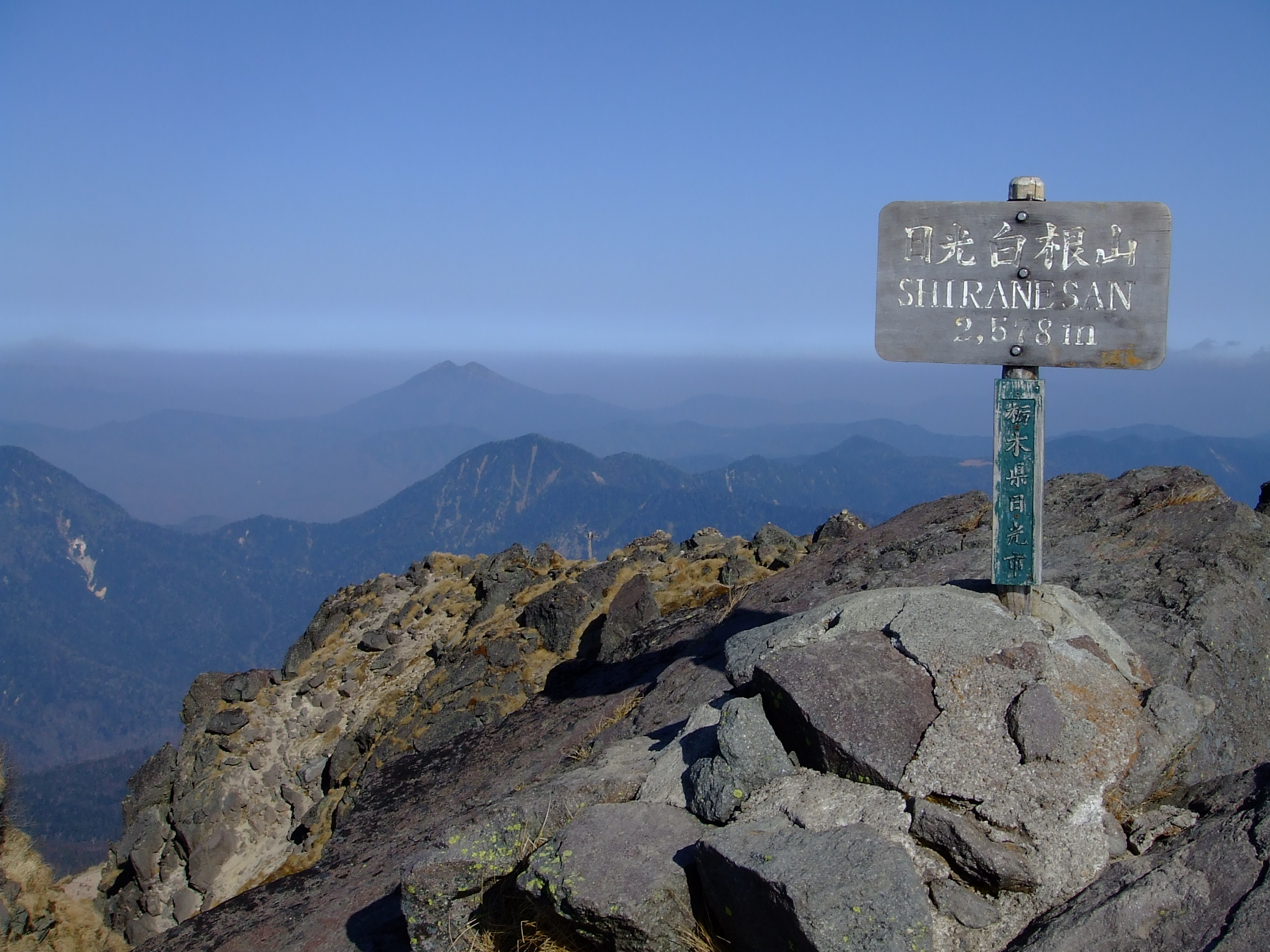
Nikkō-Shirane summit

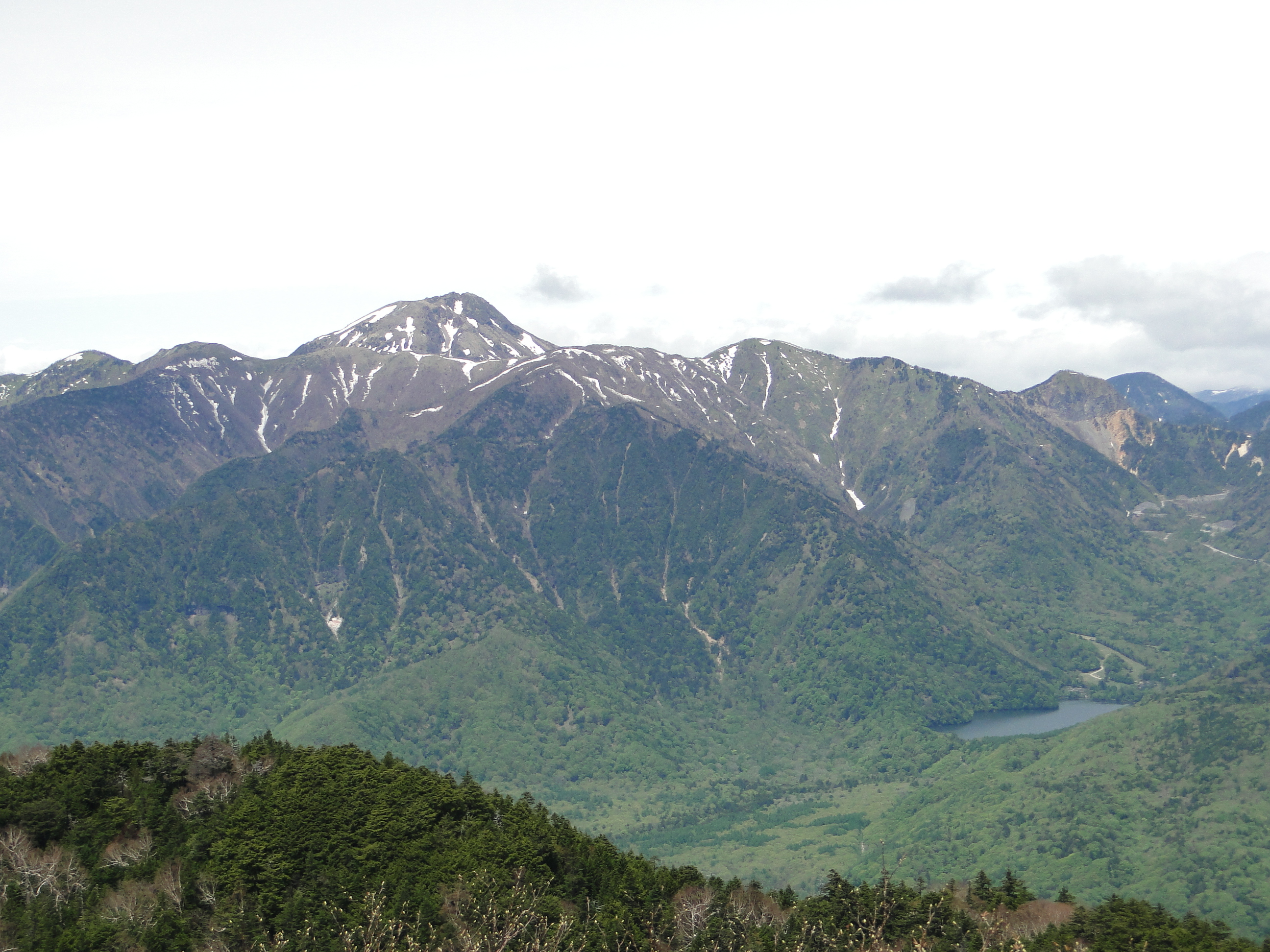
Mount Nikkō-Shirane from Mt Nikko Nantai

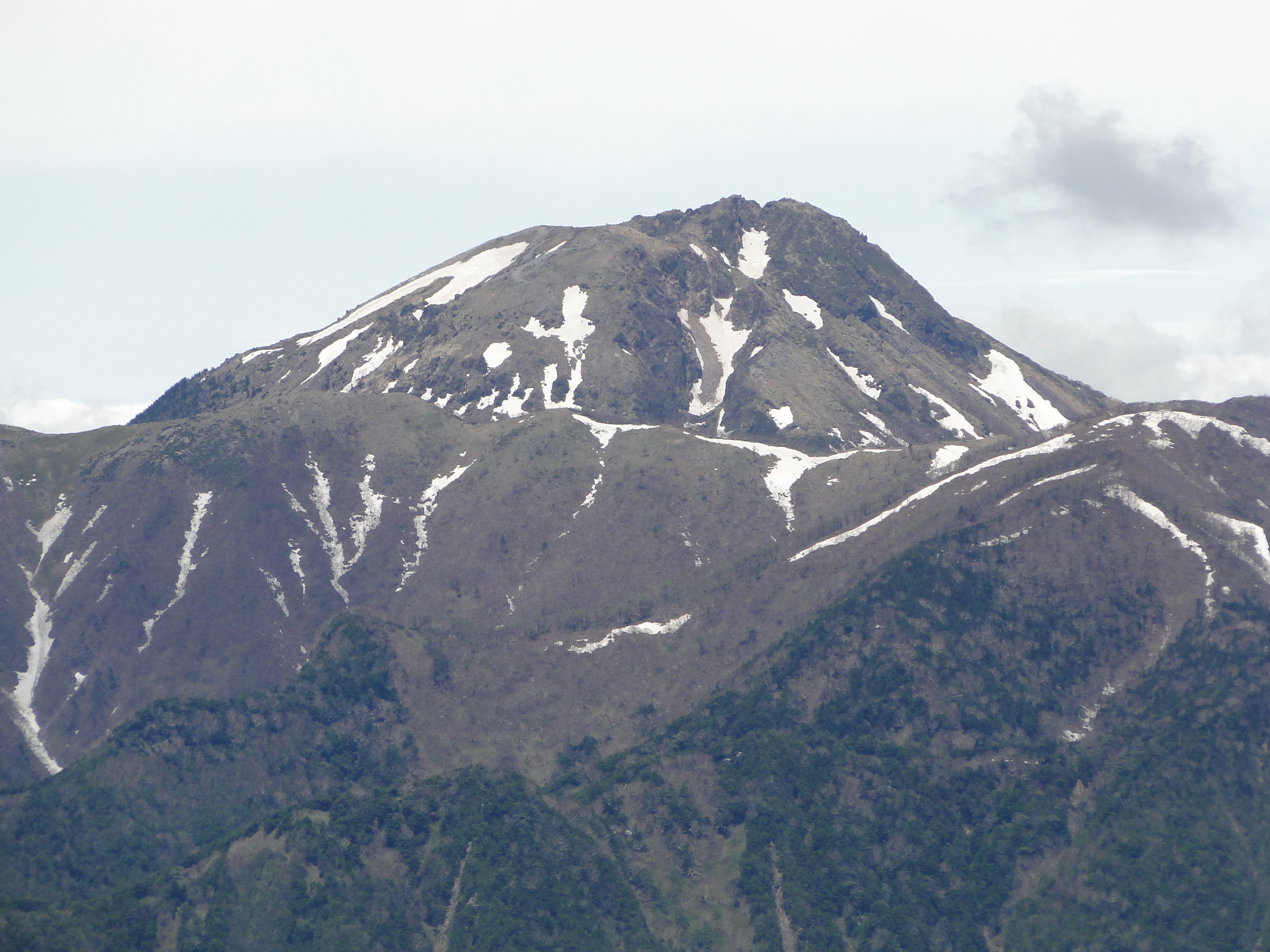
Mount Nikkō-Shirane from Mt Nikko Nantai

== See also ==
- List of mountains and hills of Japan by height
- List of Ultras of Japan
- List of Japanese prefectures by highest mountain
- Nikkō National Park
- List of volcanoes in Japan
