= Mount Ryūjin =

Mountain in Japan

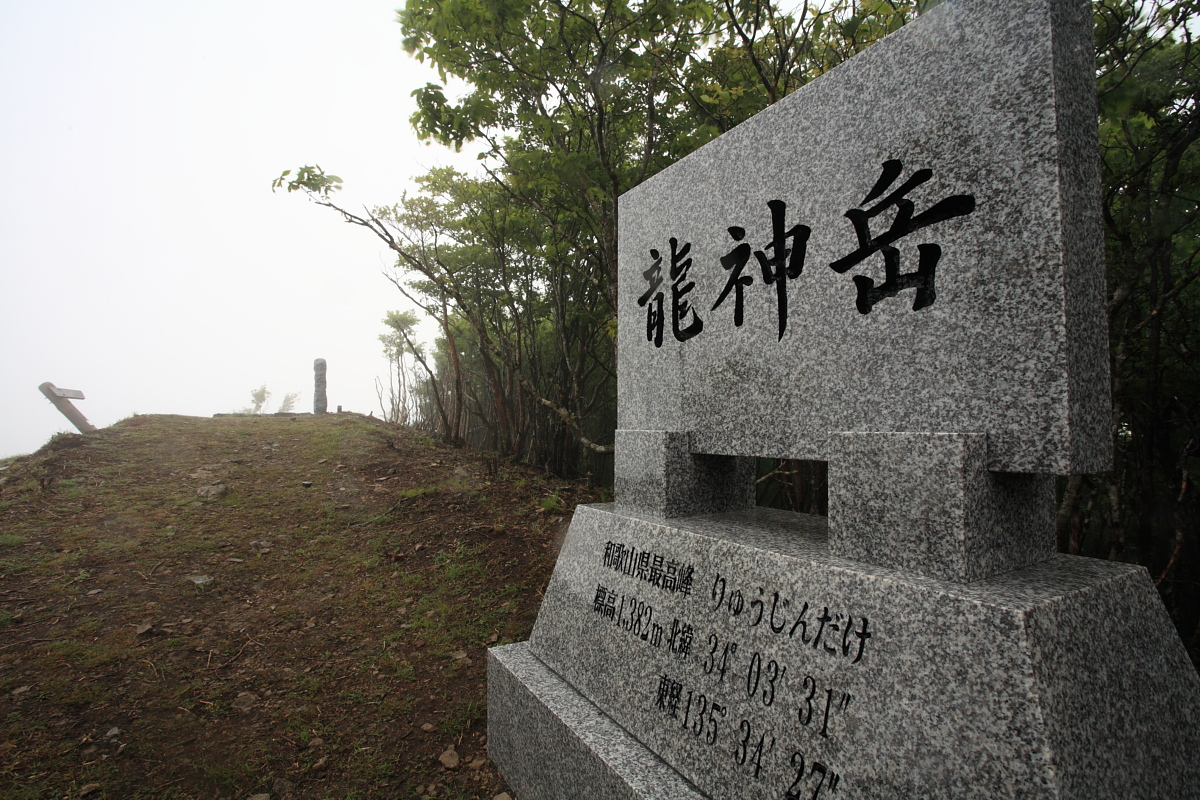

Highest point
- Elevation: 1,382 m (4,534 ft)
- Coordinates: 34°03′31″N 135°34′28″E

Geography
- Location within Japan
- Location: Honshu, Japan

Mount Ryūjin (龍神岳, Ryūjindake) is a mountain on the border between Tanabe, Wakayama and Totsukawa, Nara. At a height of 1,382 m (4,534 ft), it is the highest point in Wakayama Prefecture and the name of the mountain was given in 2008.

== Overview ==
Ryujindake is the highest peak in Wakayama Prefecture, but Mount Gomadan was recognized as the highest peak until it was found by the Geographical Survey Institute survey in November 2000 that Ryujindake is 10 m higher than Mt. Gomadan and 700 m west. Although the name was not given for a while after the altitude was known, Tanabe City started to solicit names from all over the country in 2008, and on March 3, the following year, the most popular application was "Ryujindake". It was named as "a magnificent, mysterious and familiar name".
