= Lake Biwa Museum =

Museum in Shiga Prefecture, Japan

- 琵琶湖博物館 (Biwako Hakubutsukan)
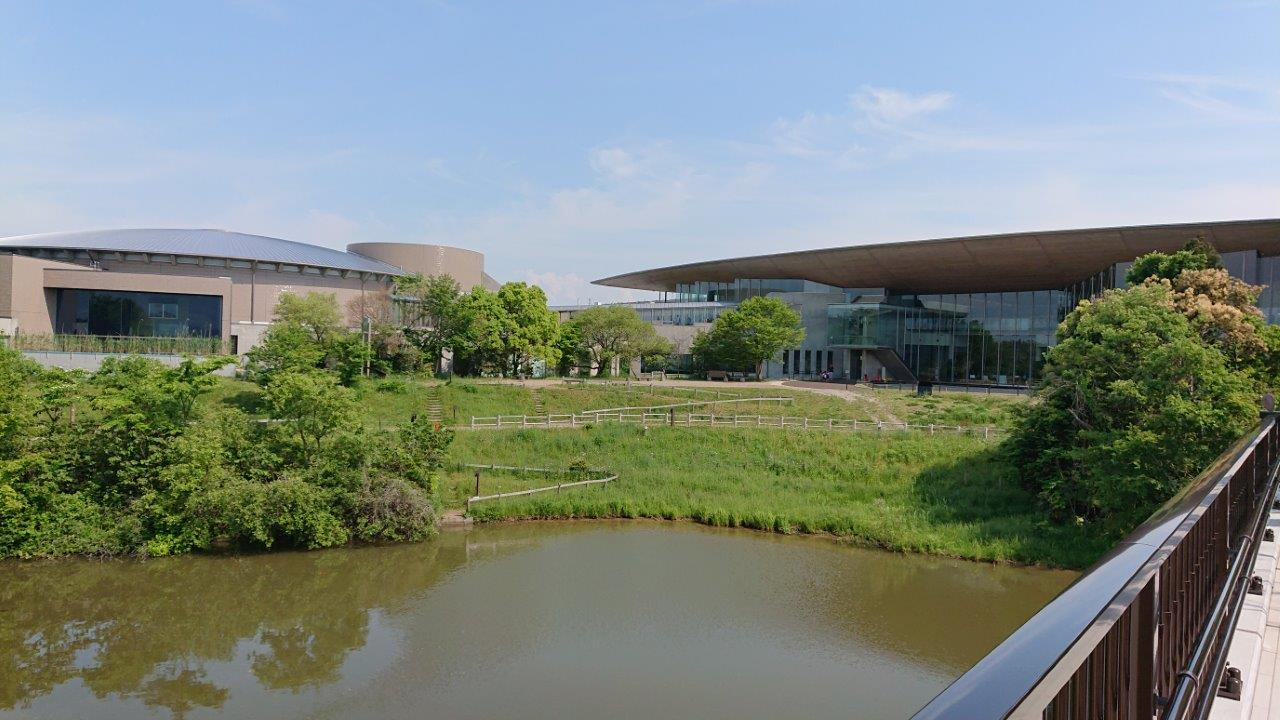
- Established: 1996
- Location: Shiga, Japan 1091 Oroshimo, Kusatsu City, Shiga Prefecture 525-0001, JAPAN
- Coordinates: 35.0741388°N 135.9349166°E
- Visitors: 450 000 (2016)
- Director: 1996- Hiroya KAWANABE 2010- Toru SHINOHARA 2019- Kei-ichi TAKAHASHI
- Public transit access: 25 minutes away from JR Kusatsu Station by bus.
- Website: www.biwahaku.jp/english/

The Lake Biwa Museum (琵琶湖博物館, Biwako Hakubutsukan) is in Shiga Prefecture, Japan. It was founded in 1996. The theme of the museum is "relationship between lakes and people" and introduces the nature and culture of Lake Biwa, the largest and oldest lake in Japan.

The Lake Biwa Museum's aquarium is one of the largest freshwater aquarium in Japan. The giant Lake Biwa catfish (Silurus biwaensis) is a popular symbol of the Lake Biwa Museum.

A full-scale replica of Maruko-bune, a traditional wooden sailing boat of the Lake Biwa, is on the exposition in the museum.

It is a member of the Japanese Association of Zoos and Aquariums (JAZA), the aquarium is accredited as a Registered Museum by the Museum Act from Ministry of Education, Culture, Sports, Science and Technology.

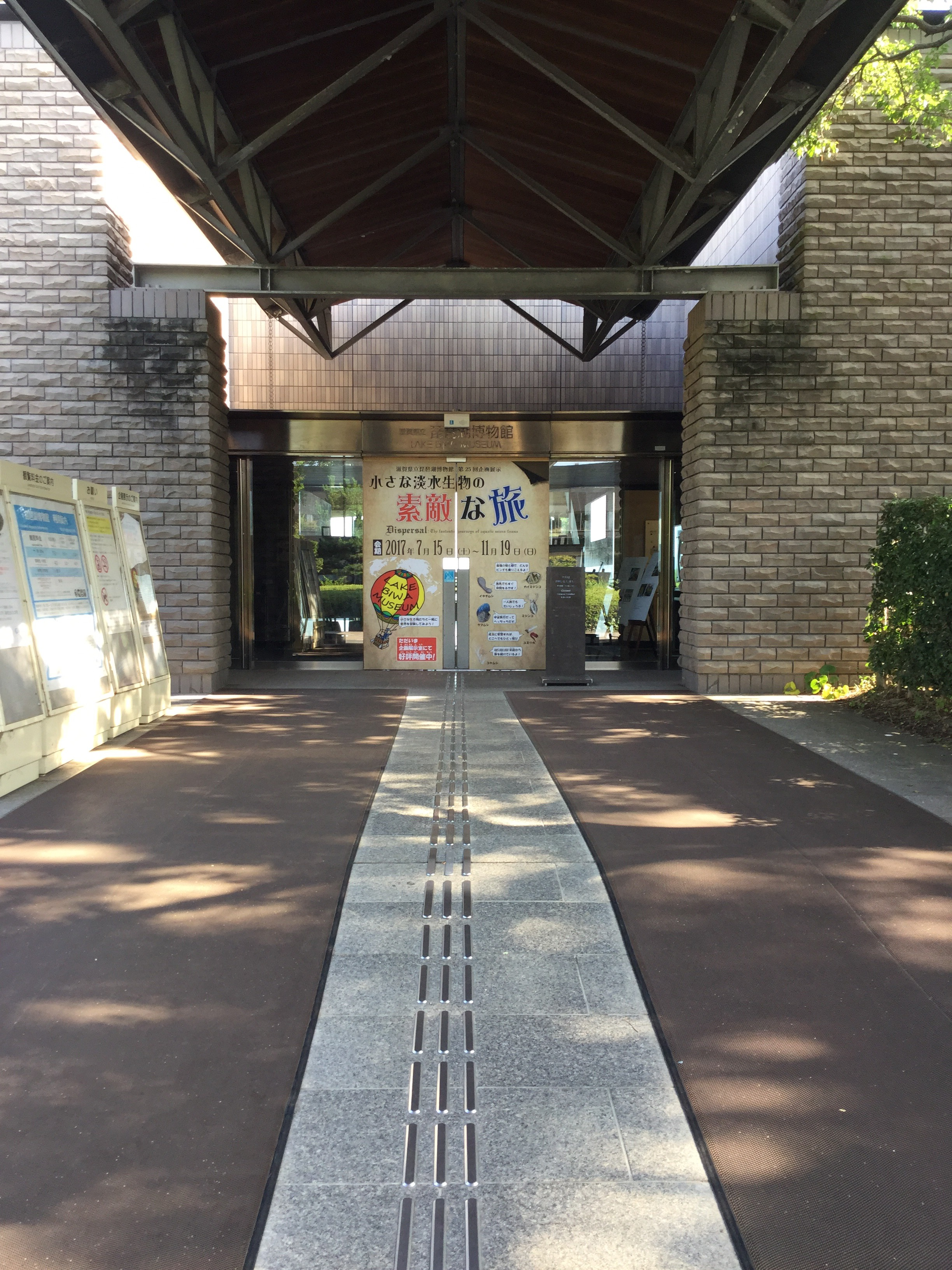
Entrance

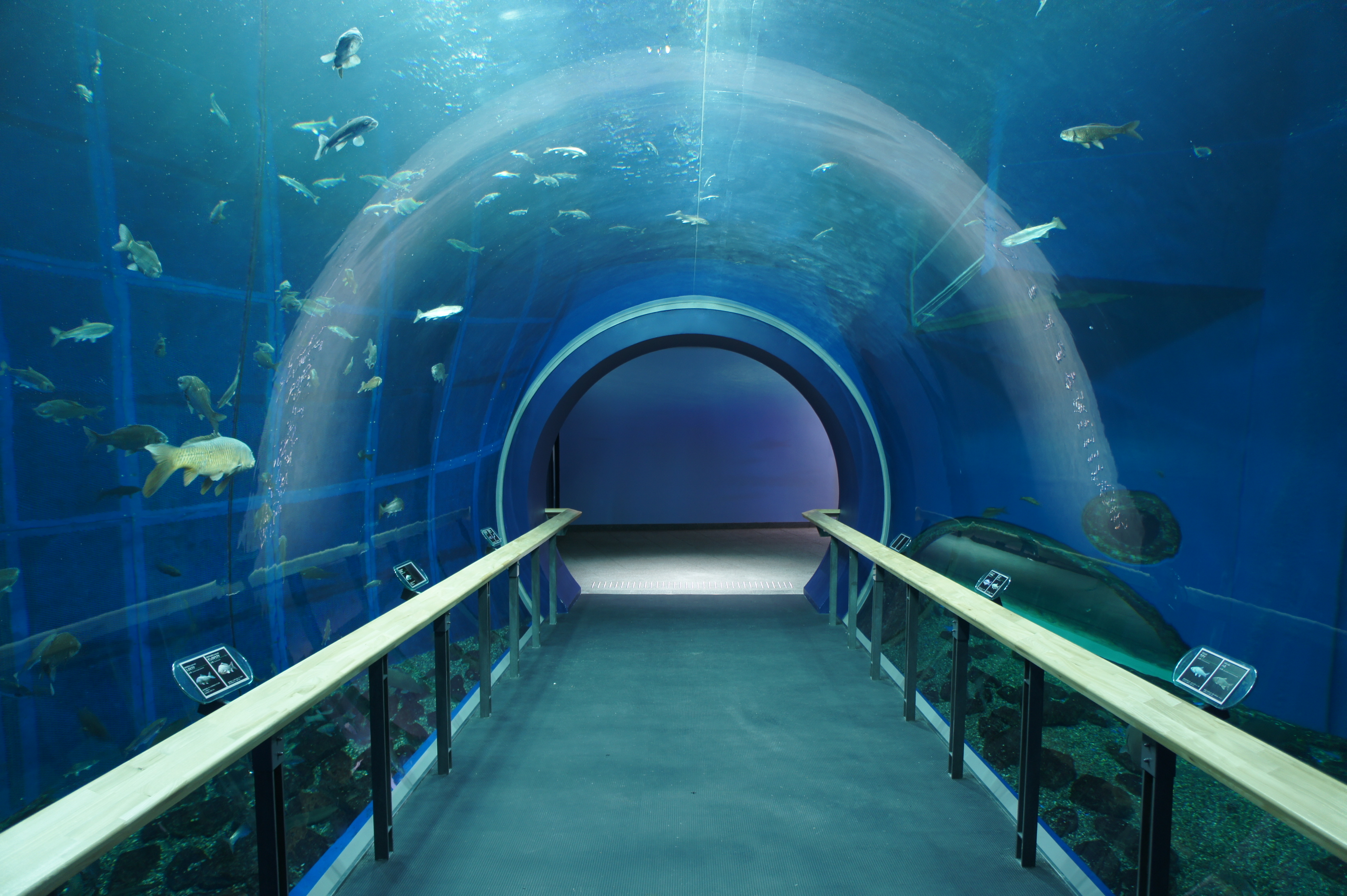
The tunnel tank has a capacity of approximately 500,000 litres (132,000 US gal) of water and was newly constructed in 2016.

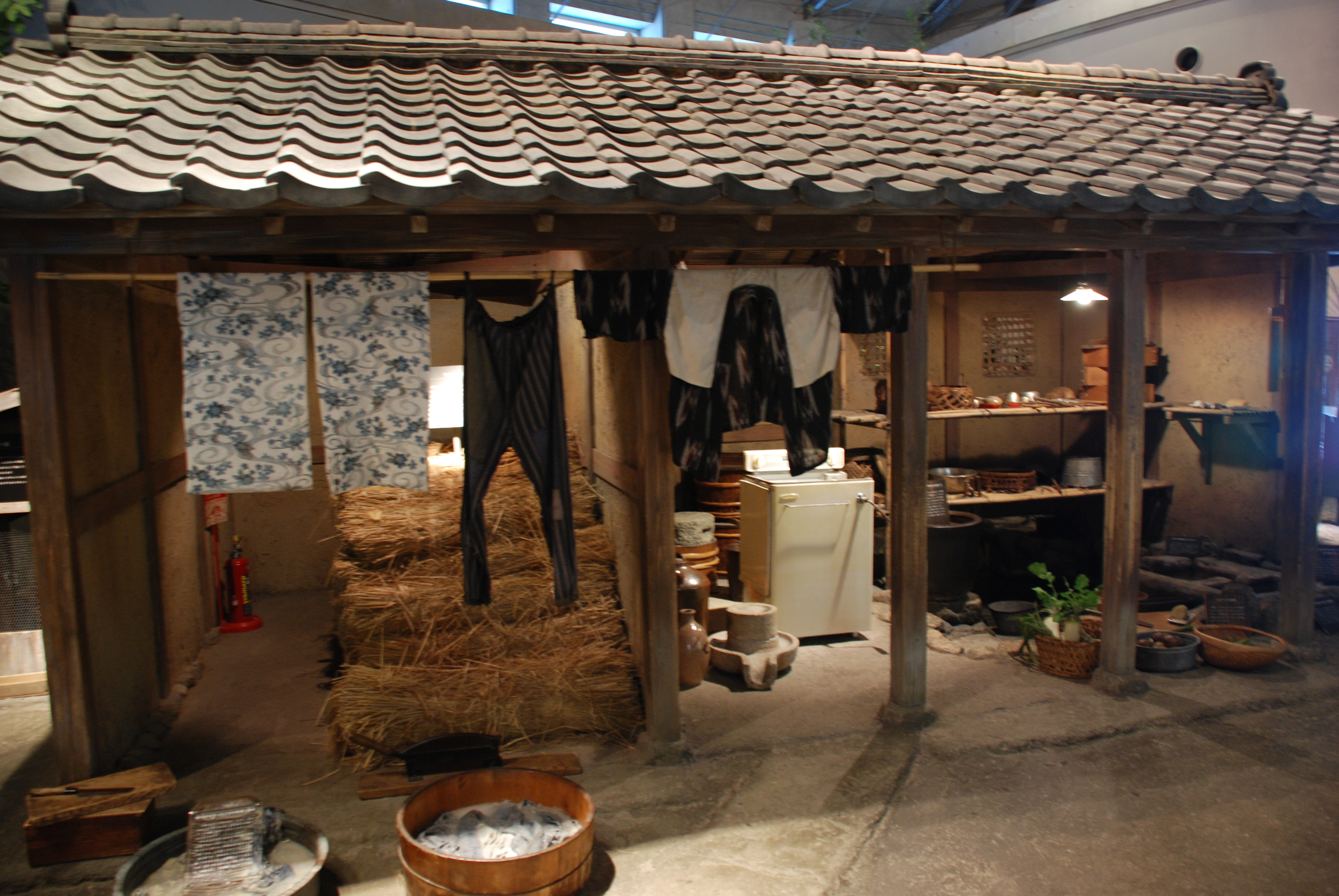
In Gallery C, an actual private house (the Tomie family) relocated from Hikone City is on display, faithfully reproducing the way of life around 1964, including electrical appliances and household goods.

== Philosophy ==
The purpose of the museum To build a better coexistence between the lake and humans by deepening our comprehensive understanding of Lake Biwa (Article 1 of the Ordinance Concerning the Establishment and Management of the Lake Biwa Museum, Shiga Prefecture).

Activity Policy

1. Research
2. Interaction and Service
3. Information
4. Material Maintenance
5. Exhibit

Three "Fundamental Principles"

1. Museum with a theme
to be a comprehensive museum that grows and develops by simultaneously dealing with both nature and culture under the theme of "the lake and people".
Lake Biwa is a lake rich in nature and deeply related to people, and it is necessary to have a comprehensive nature that considers the relationship between people and nature. Therefore, the Lake Biwa Museum aims to be a museum that can accumulate knowledge and information about Lake Biwa and other lakes and marshes from the perspectives of both nature and people, and reflect this knowledge and information in its exhibitions and exchange activities, based on research and surveys under the theme of "Lakes and People". By maintaining such a comprehensive nature, new discoveries will be made, and museum activities will be guaranteed to provide enjoyment that will make people want to visit again and again. Based on the internationally valuable research and investigation of Lake Biwa, the museum can be expected to play an important role internationally by enhancing research to understand the global environment, biodiversity conservation, and cultural uniqueness.

2. A museum that serves as an invitation to the field
The museum aims to be a gateway to the field as an attractive locality.
Lake Biwa and its catchment area are a natural ecosystem and a history of nature and people. It is a particularly rich field with hidden relationships with the unseen and unknown. The museum will be a place to plan and practice programs that will serve as an entry point for research and exchange activities in the region. This will also aim to create opportunities for people to become interested in people's interests, lifestyles, and the region.

3. Museum as a place of exchange
Aim to create a museum that can be used for a wide range of purposes by a diverse range of people, and where they can interact with each other.
The museum should be a place where the general public and experts alike can enjoy and experience exhibitions, exchange and service activities, research and survey activities, etc., and a place to learn and meet others. To foster encounters with the unknown and with knowledge, and to be a place where a diverse range of people can get involved.

== Exhibitions ==
- Gallery A: Geological history
- Gallery B: Human history and folklore
- Gallery C: Environmental issues and ecology
- Discovery room for children
- Special exhibits
- Outdoor exhibits
- Aquarium

== Gallery ==
Exterior

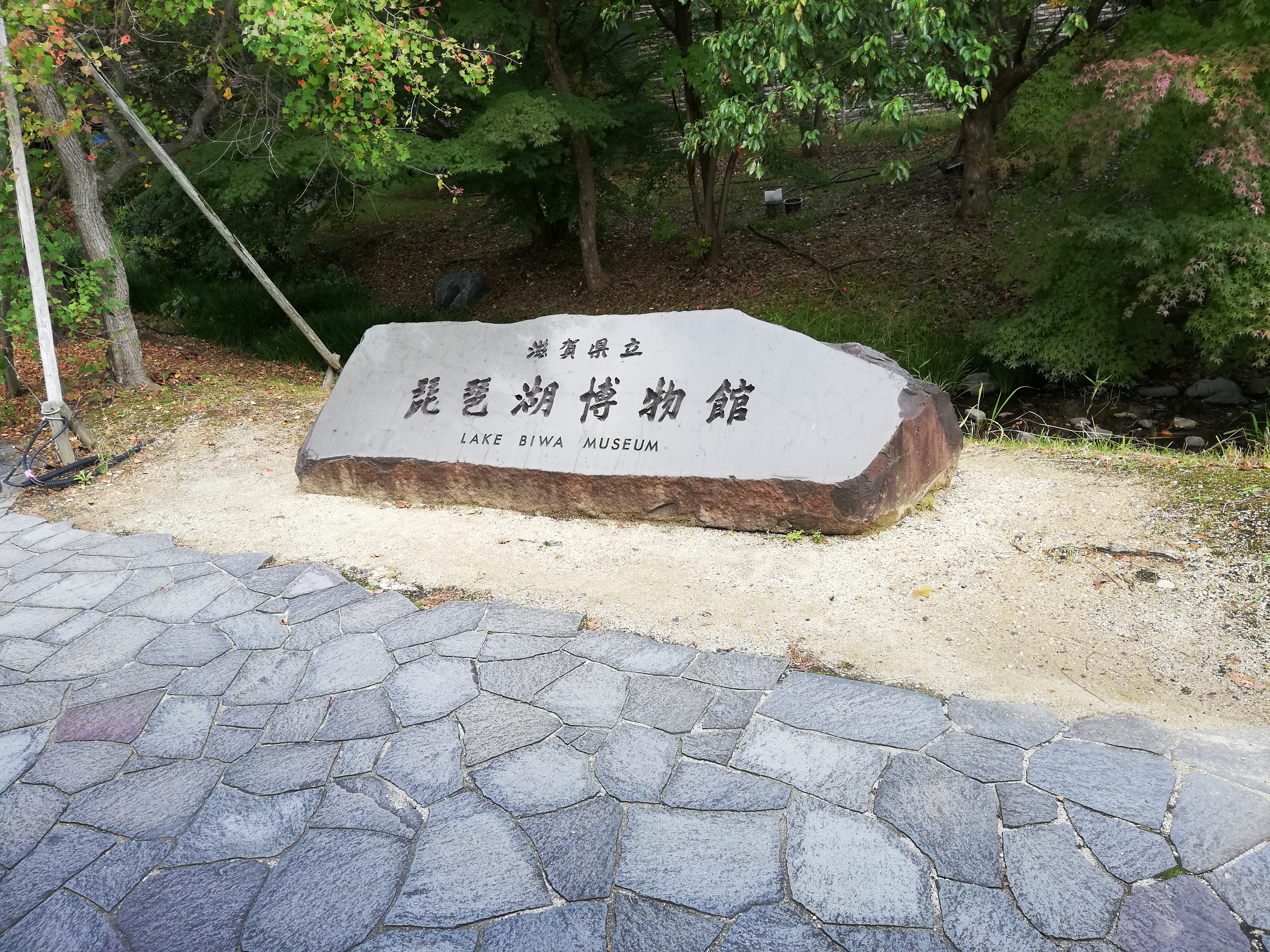

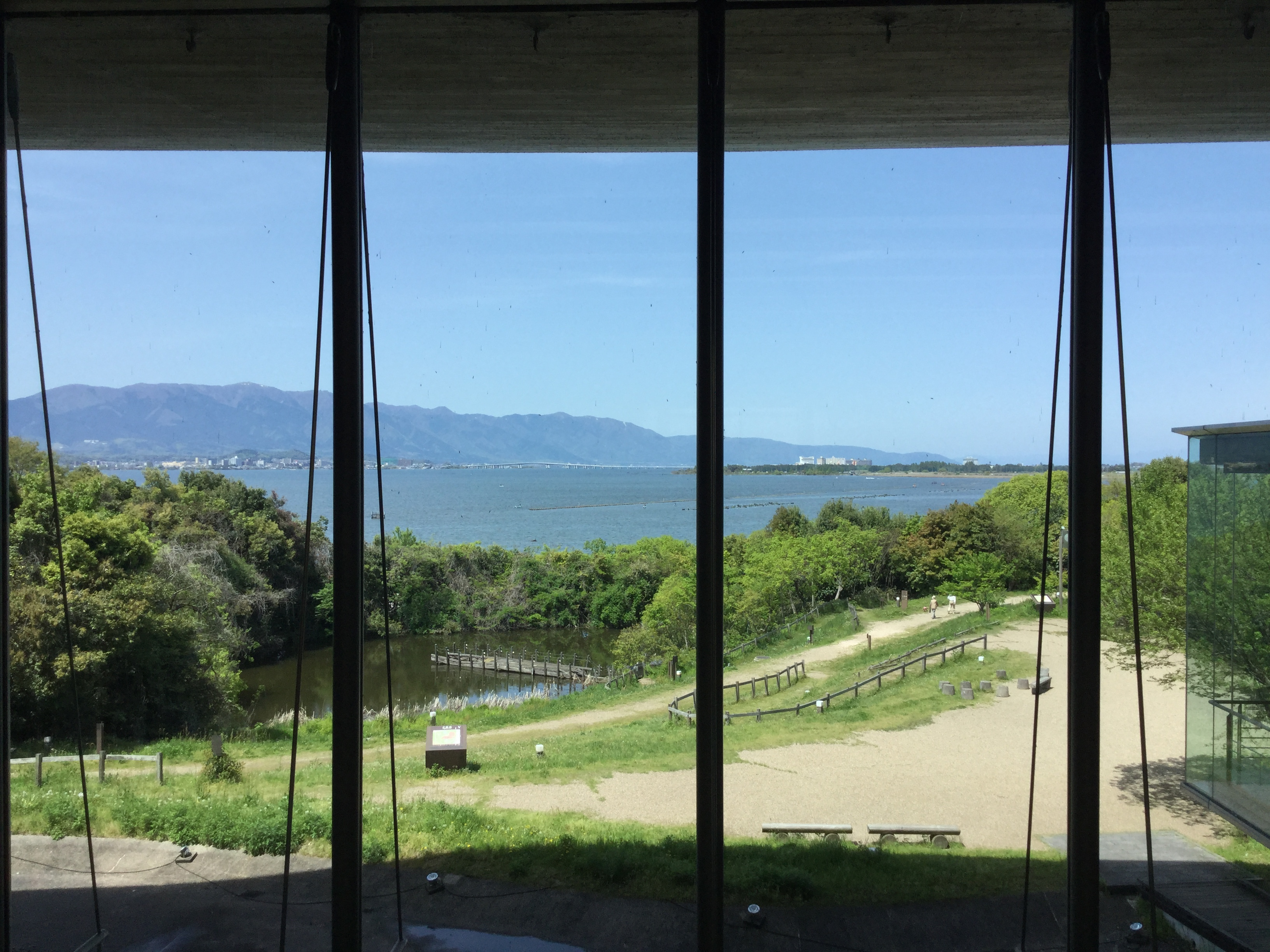

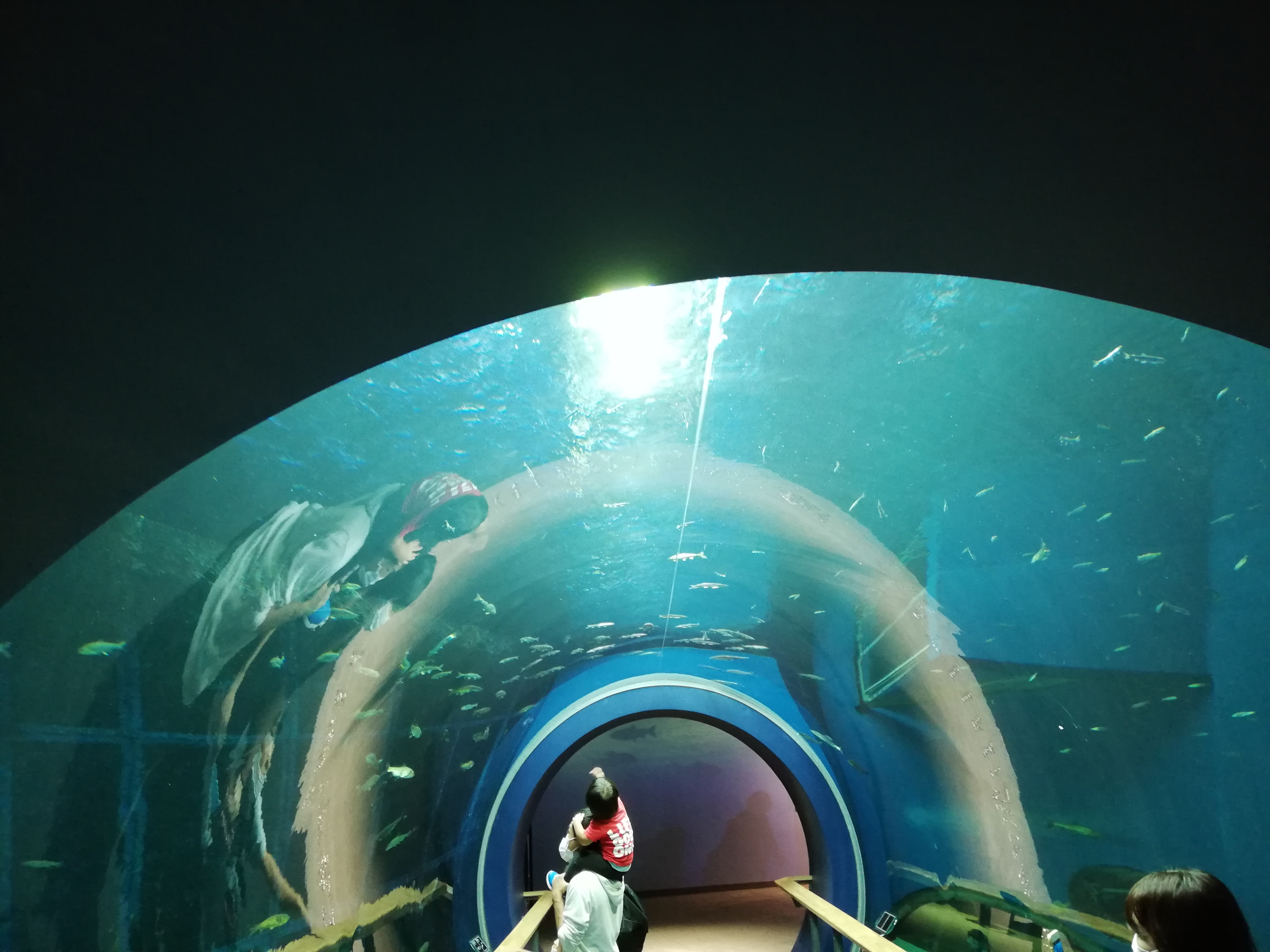

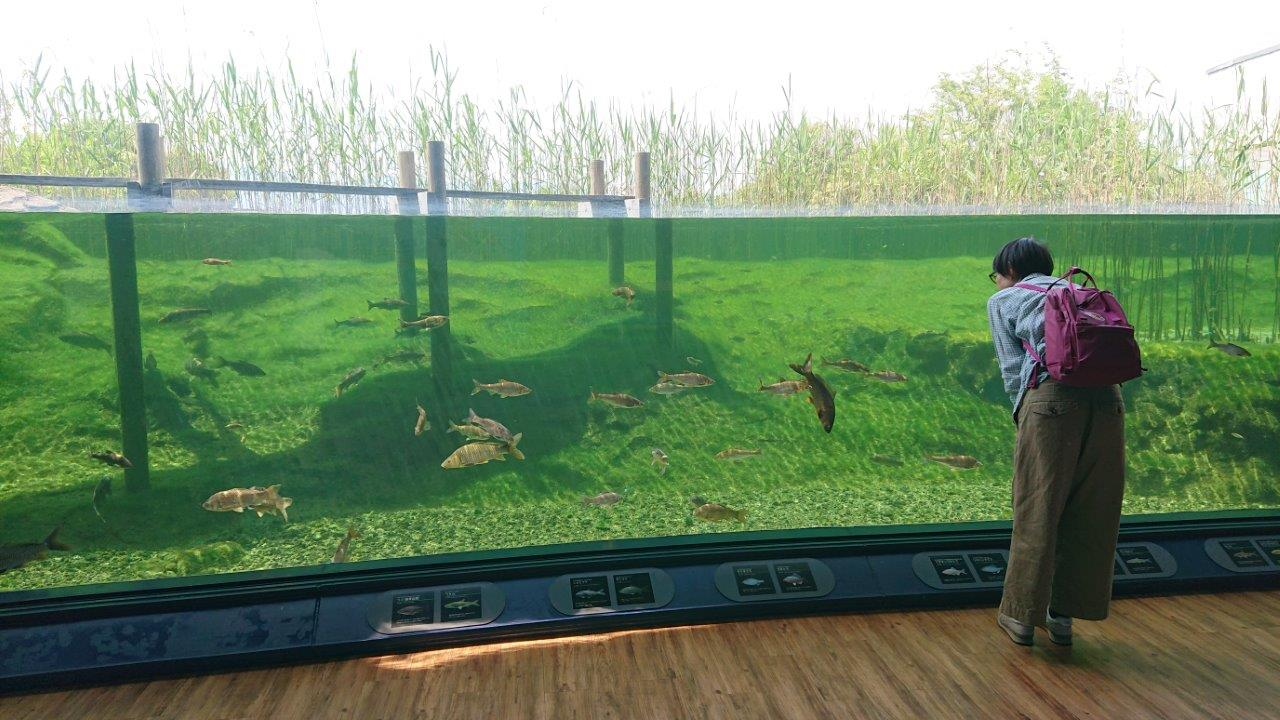

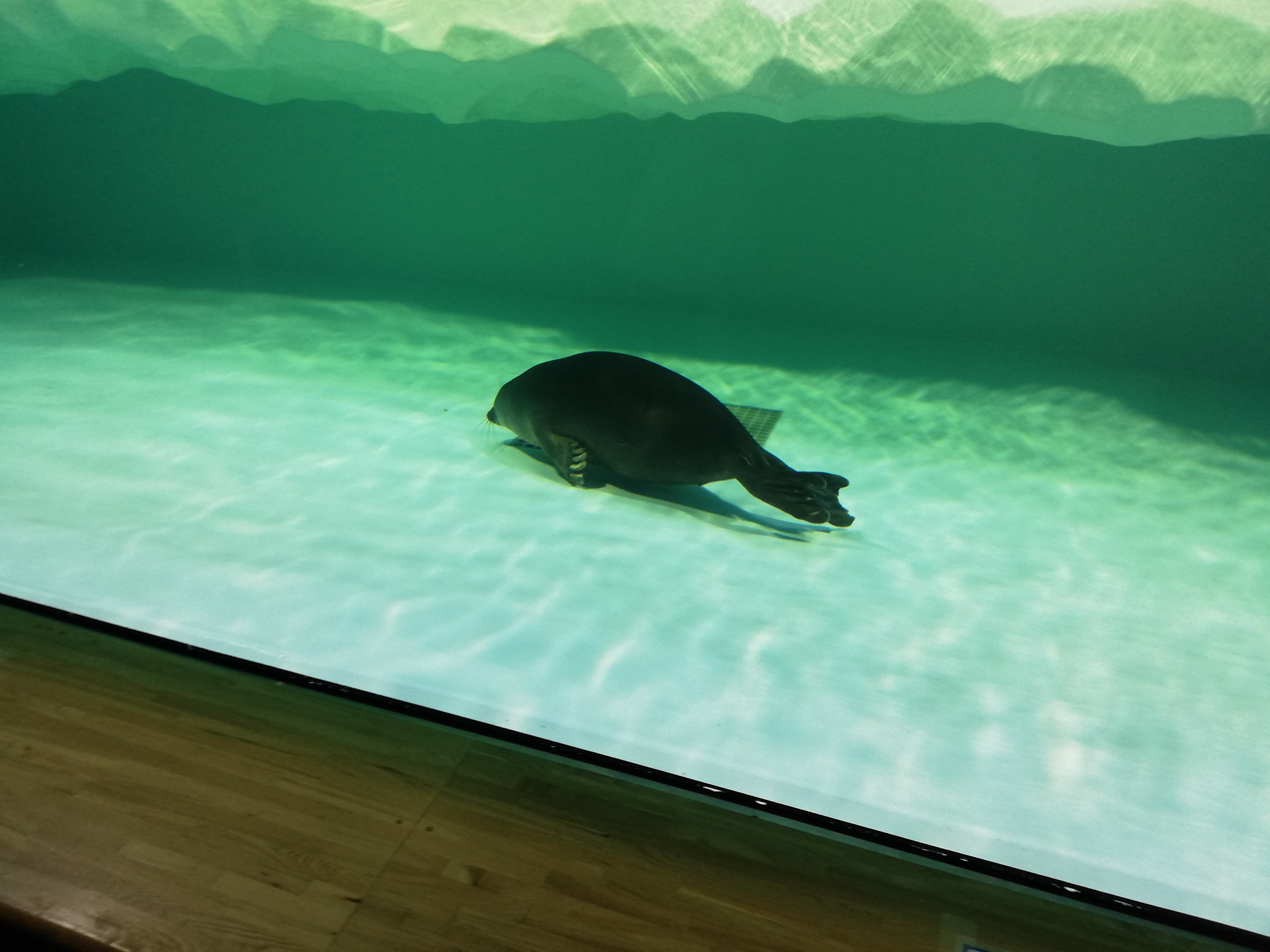

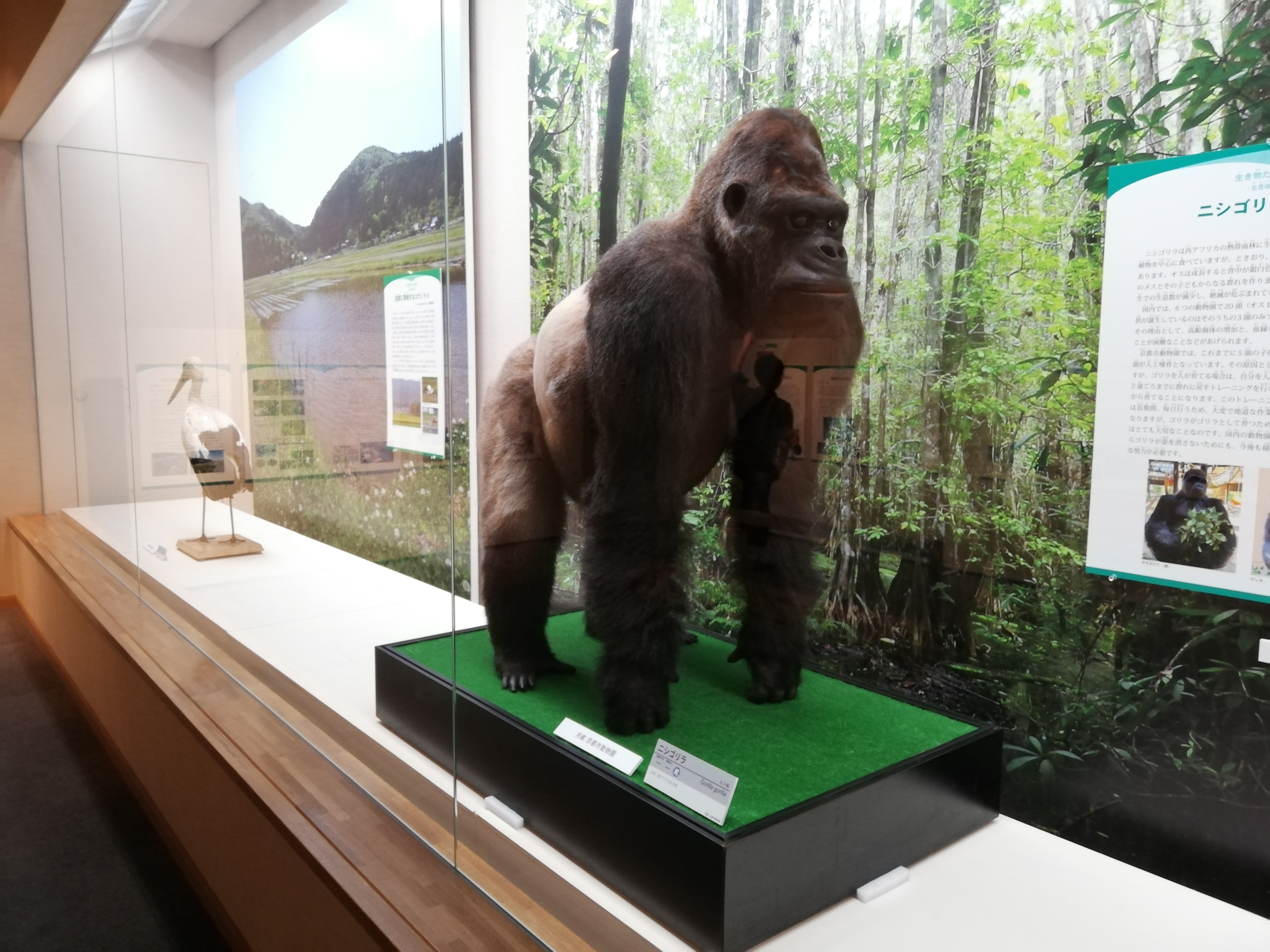

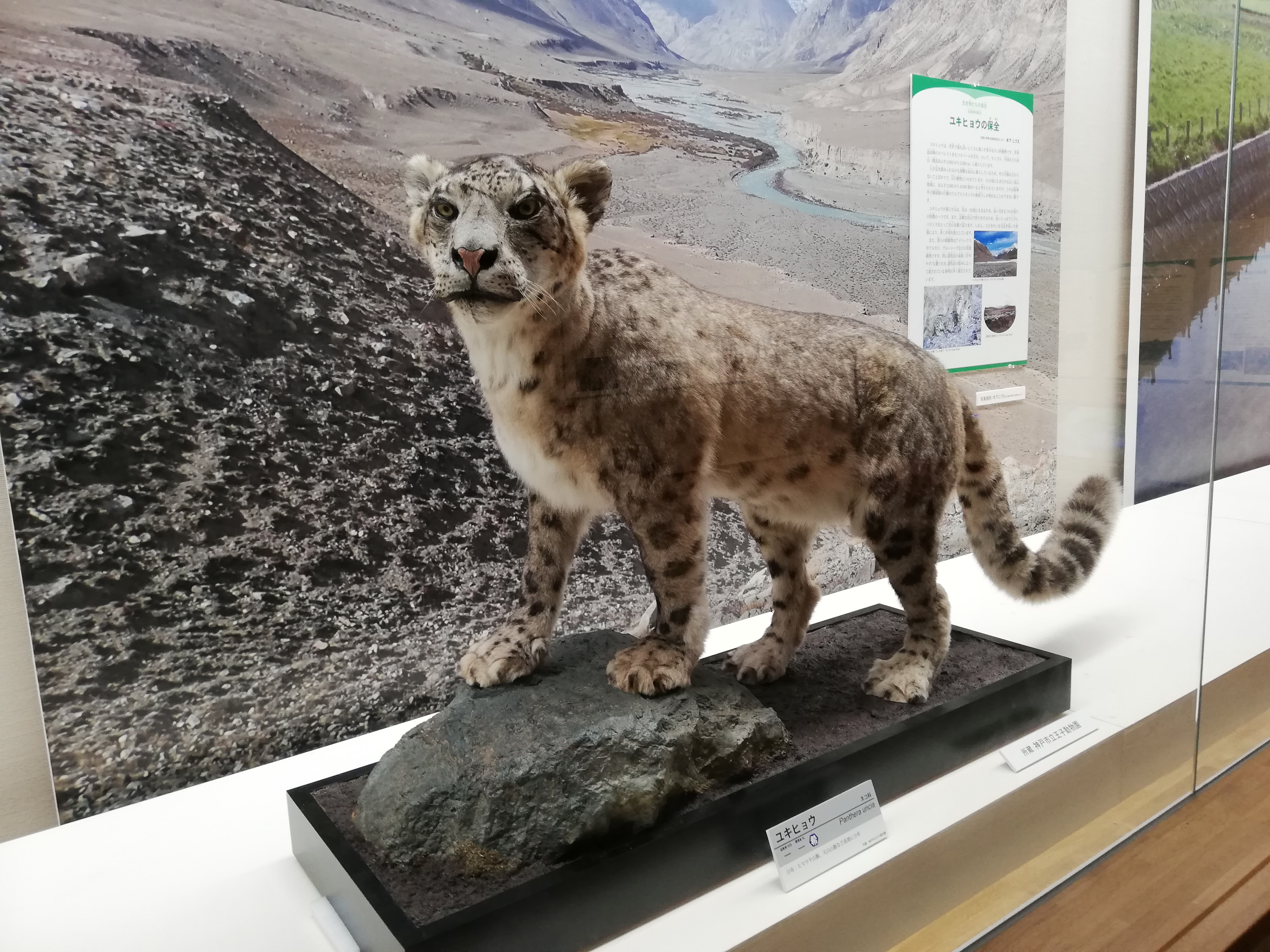

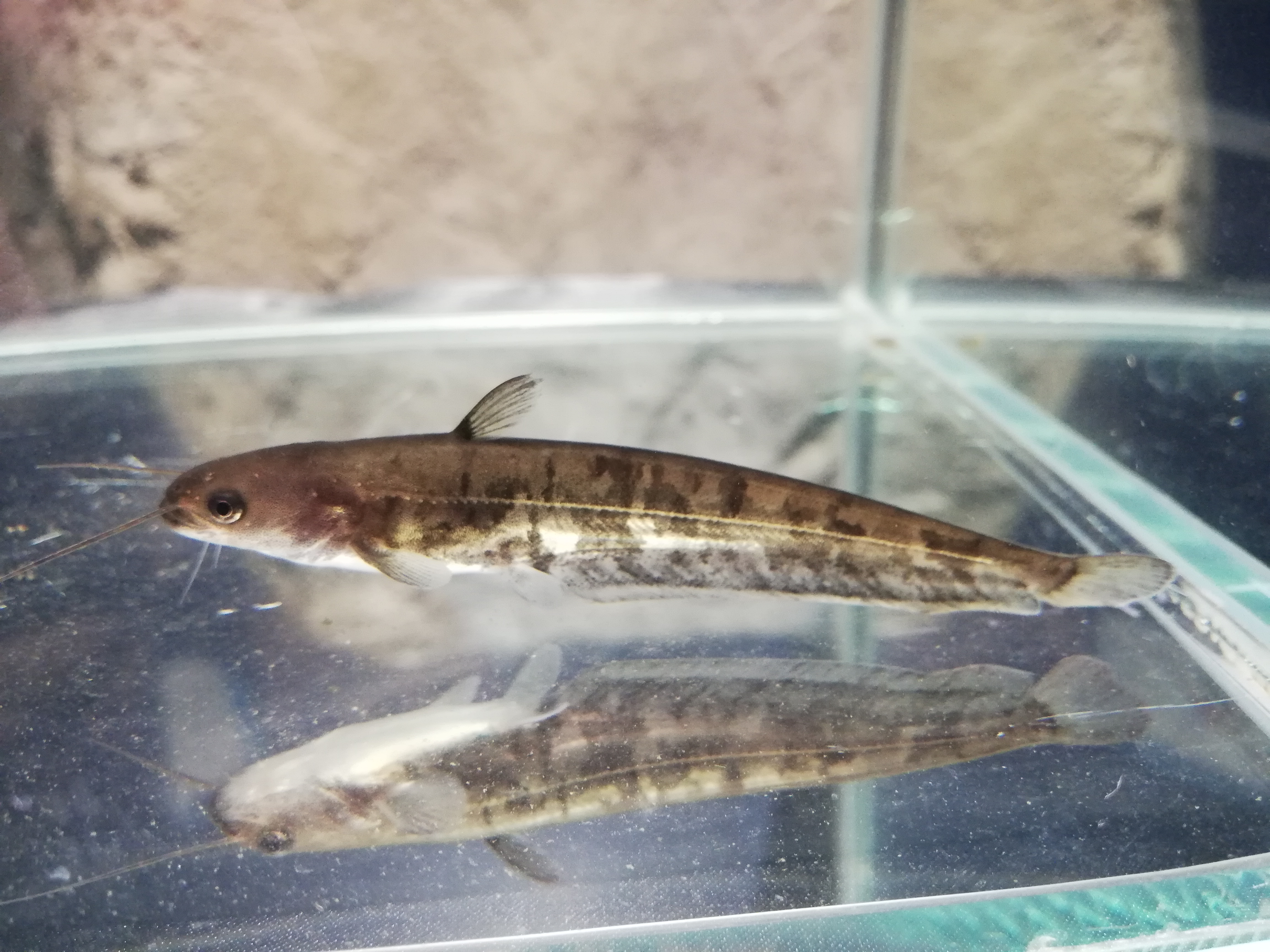

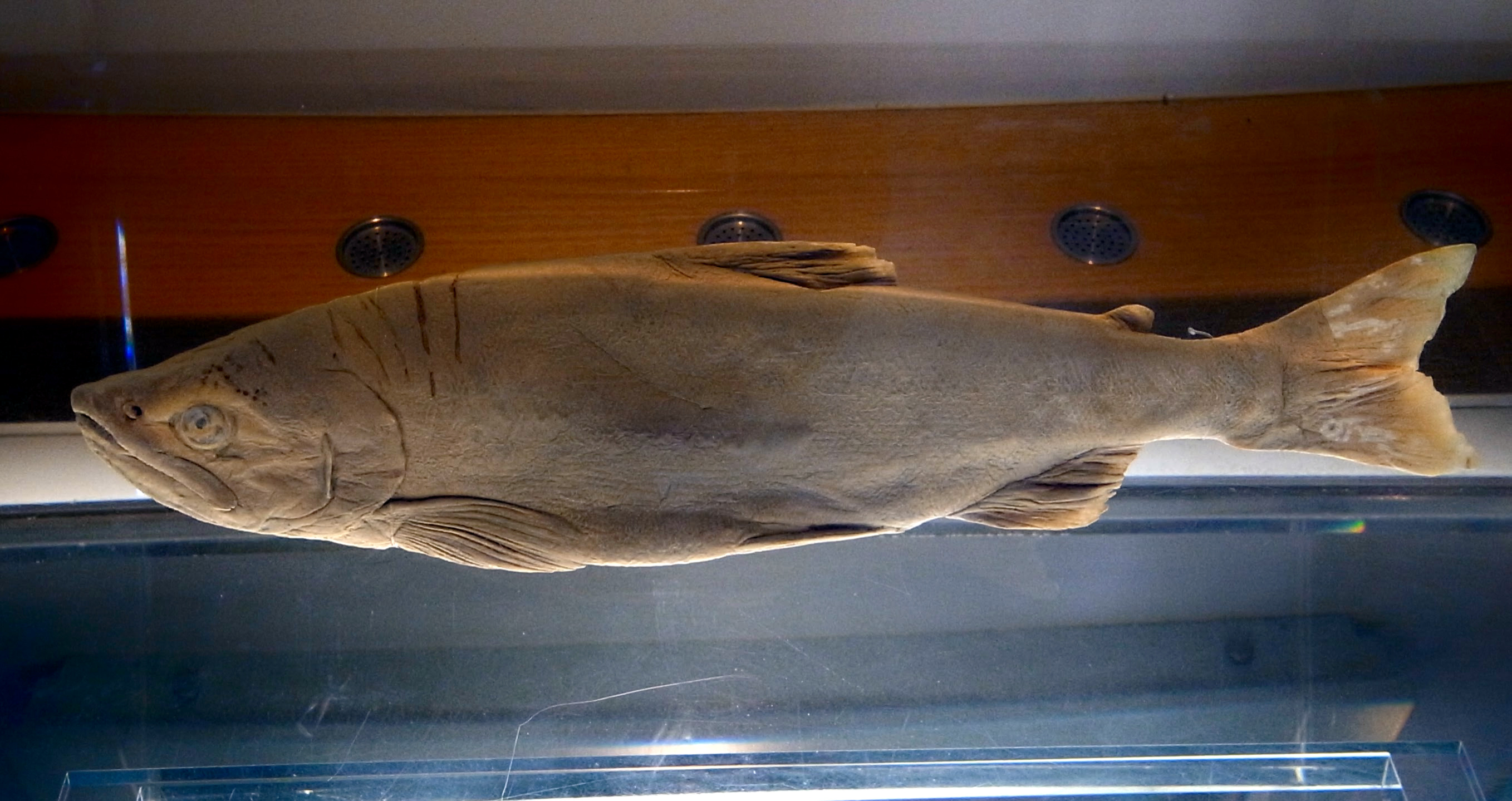

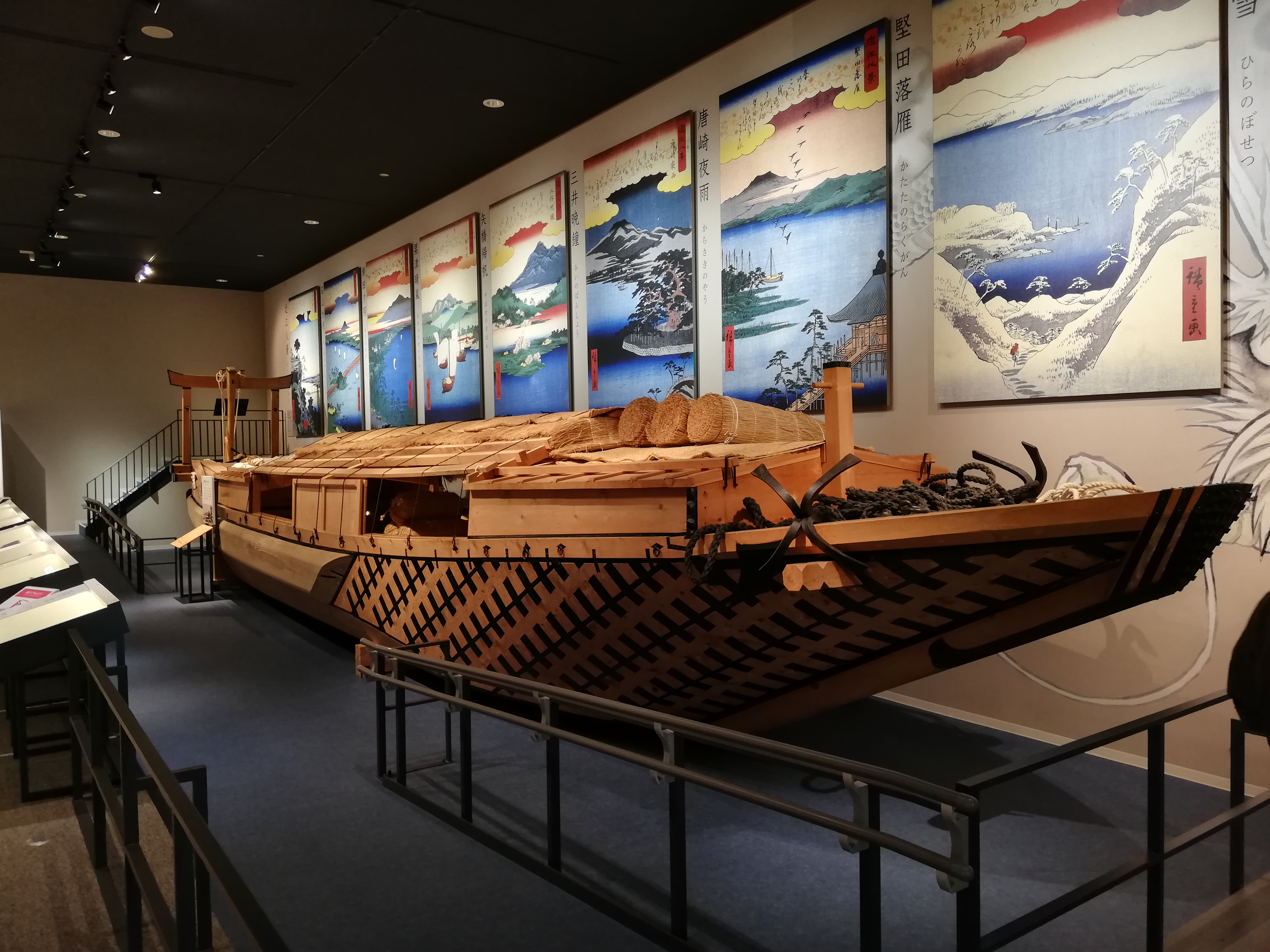

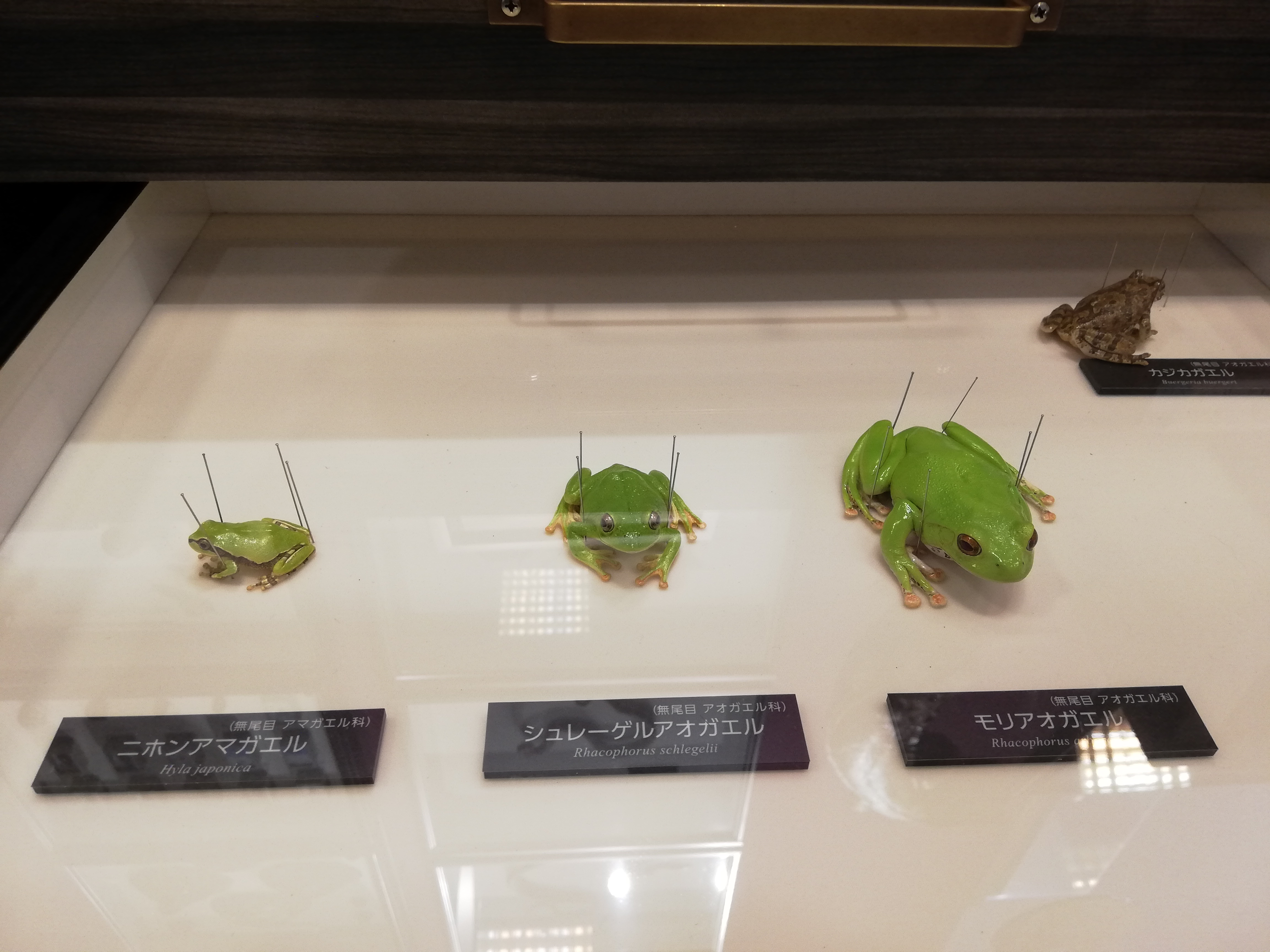

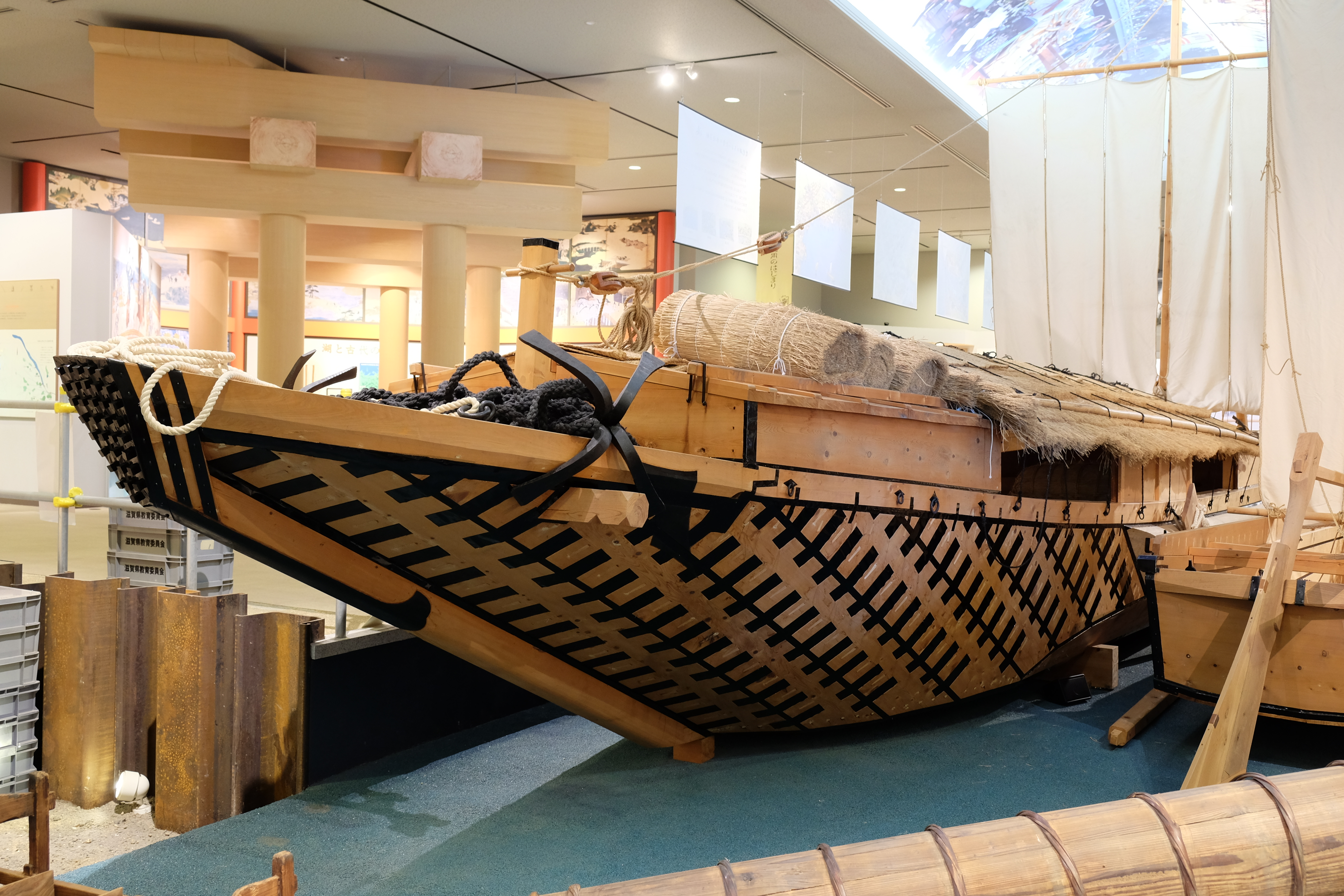

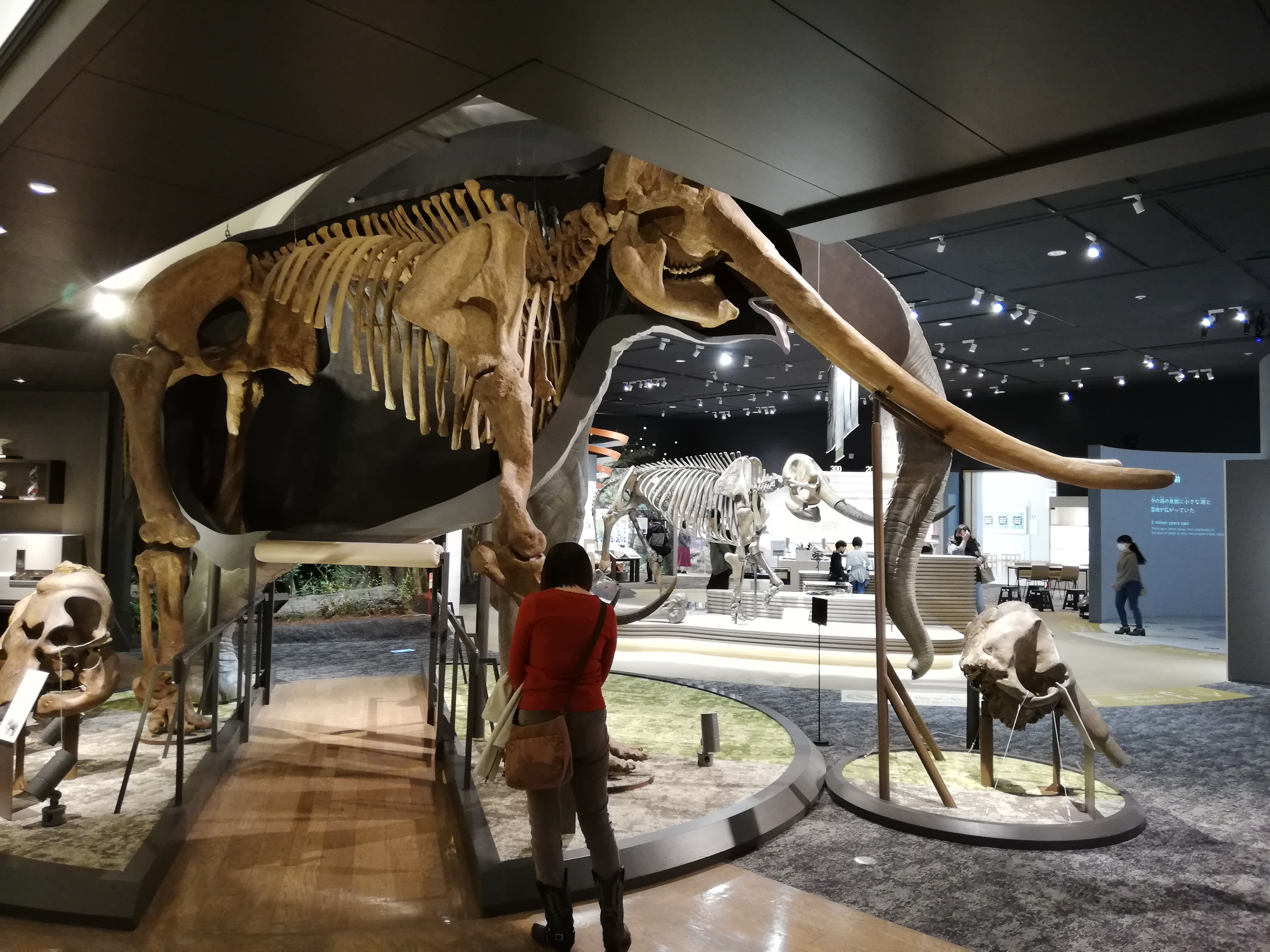

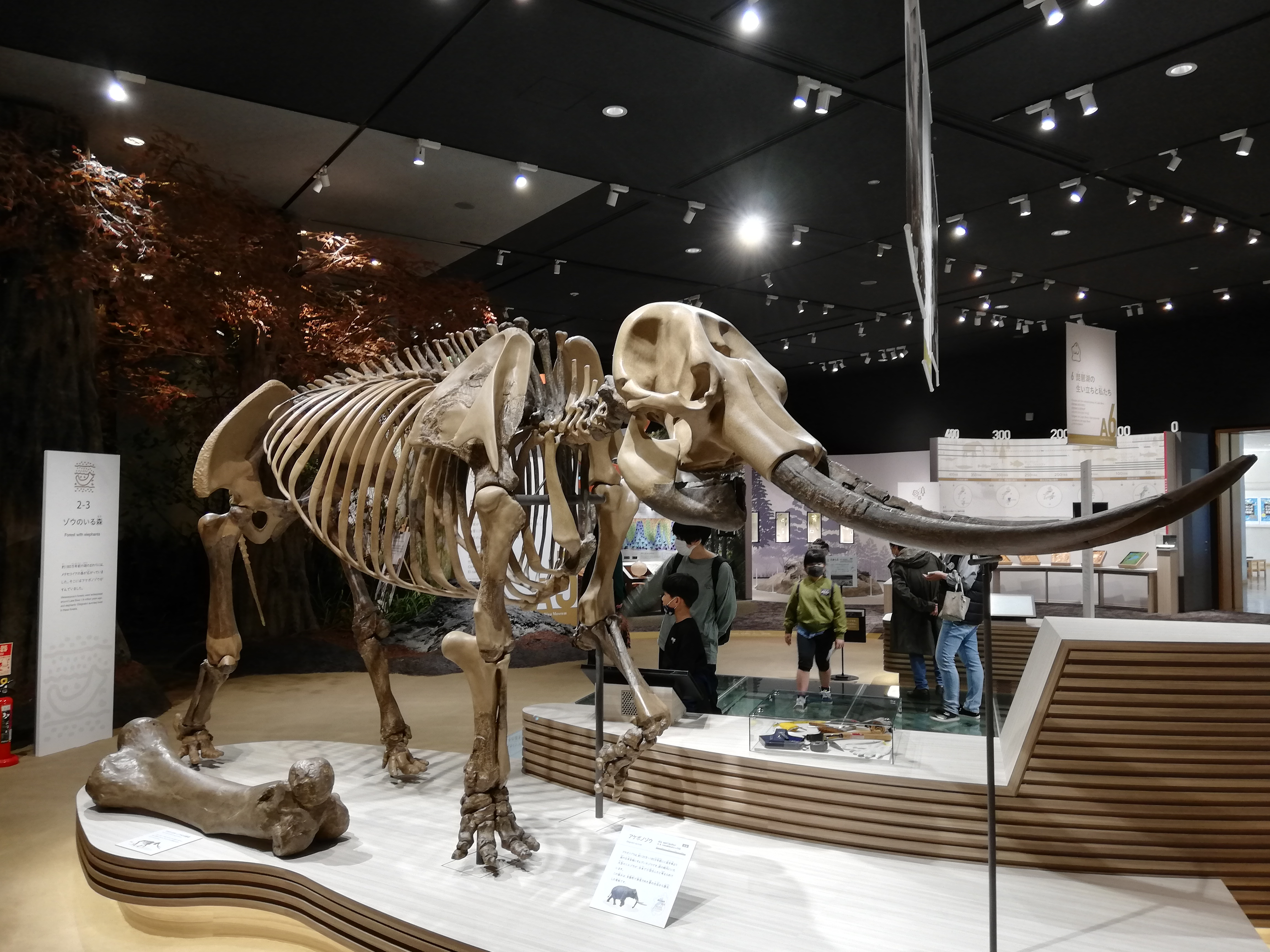

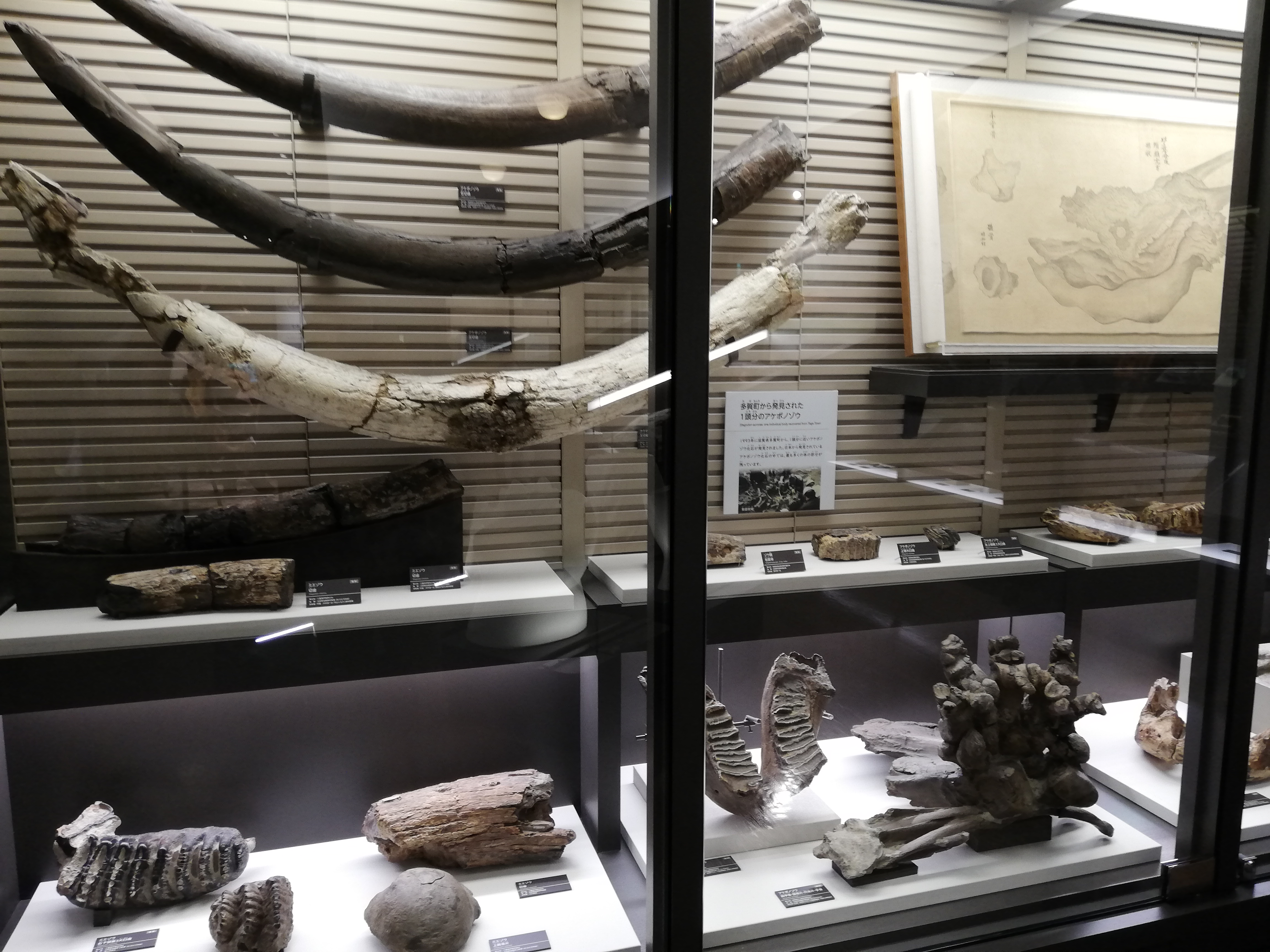

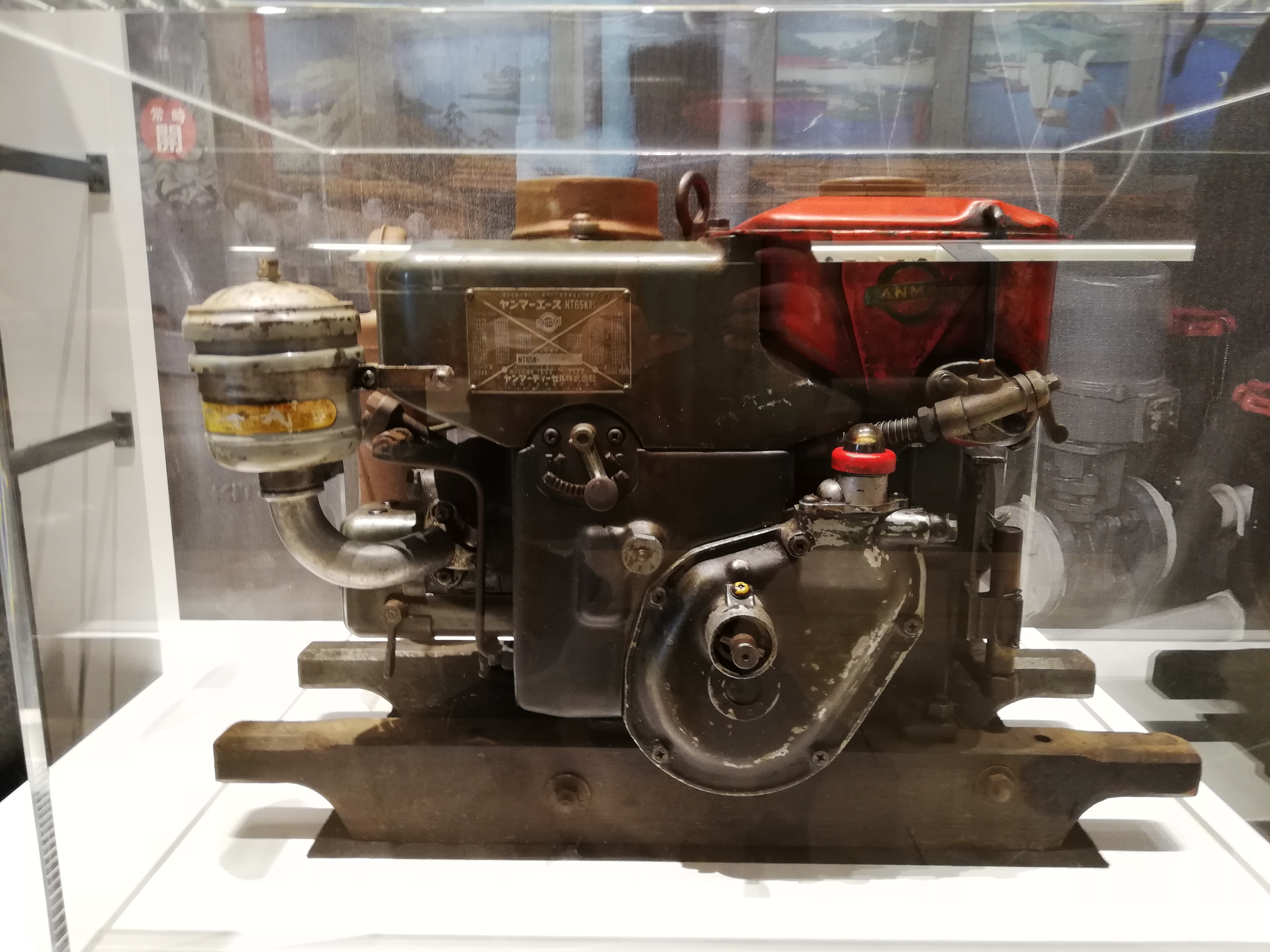

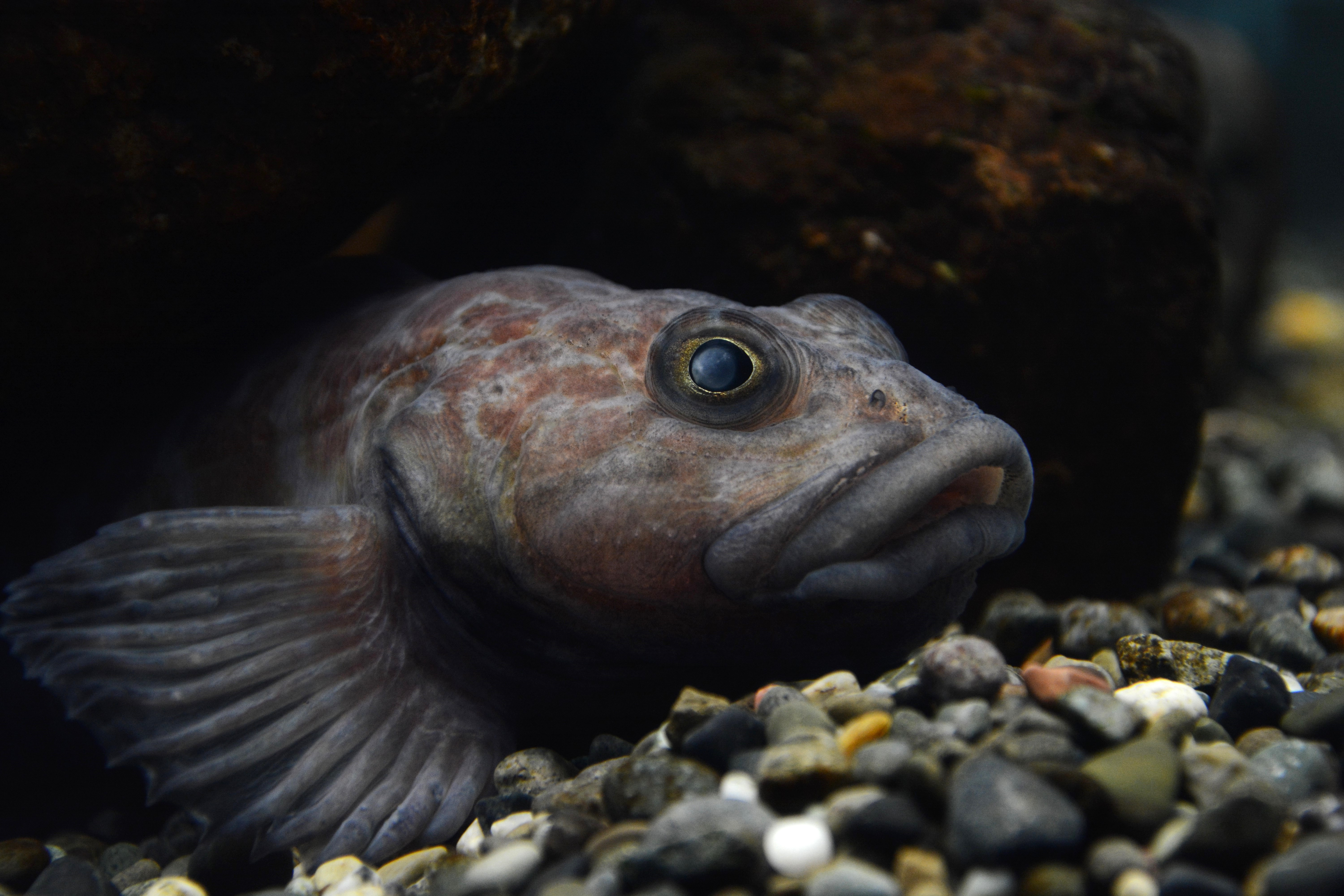

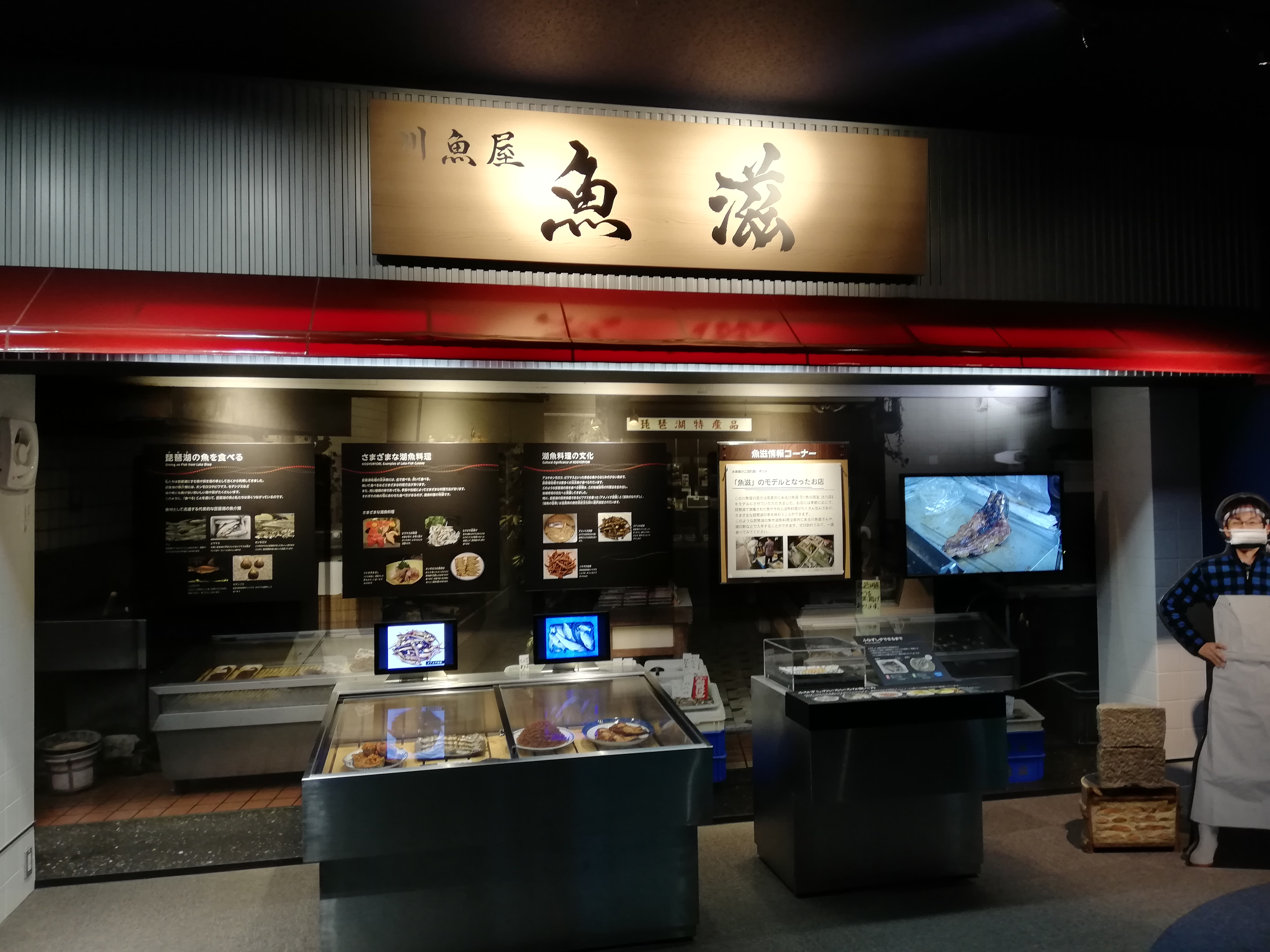

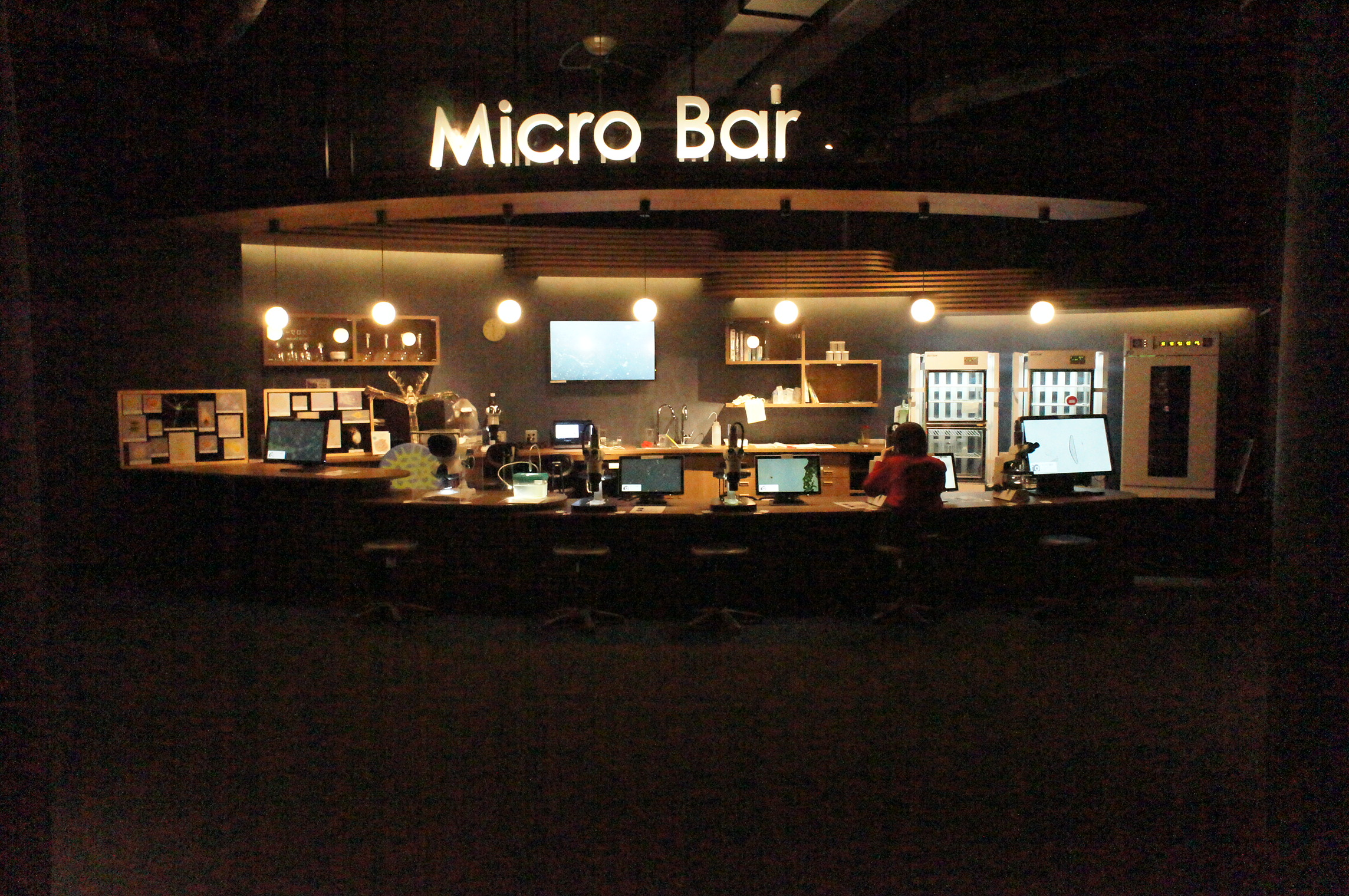

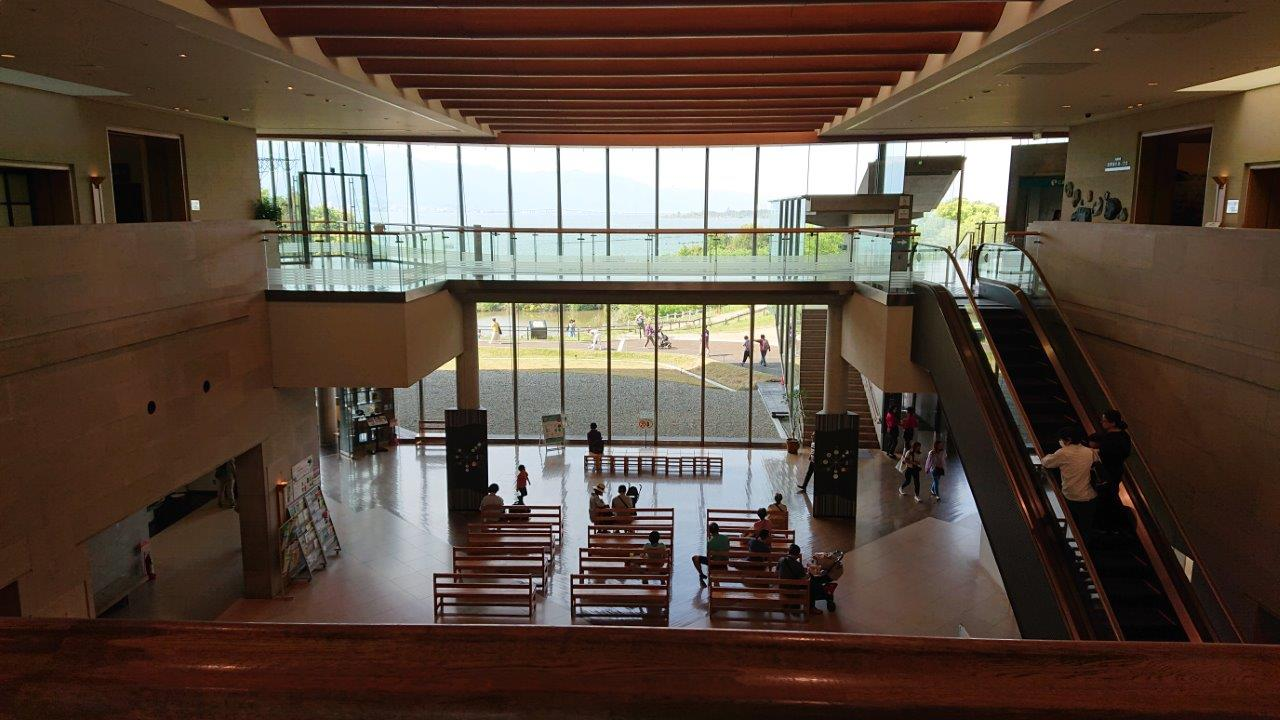
