= Maruko-bune =

Japanese wooden sailing boat

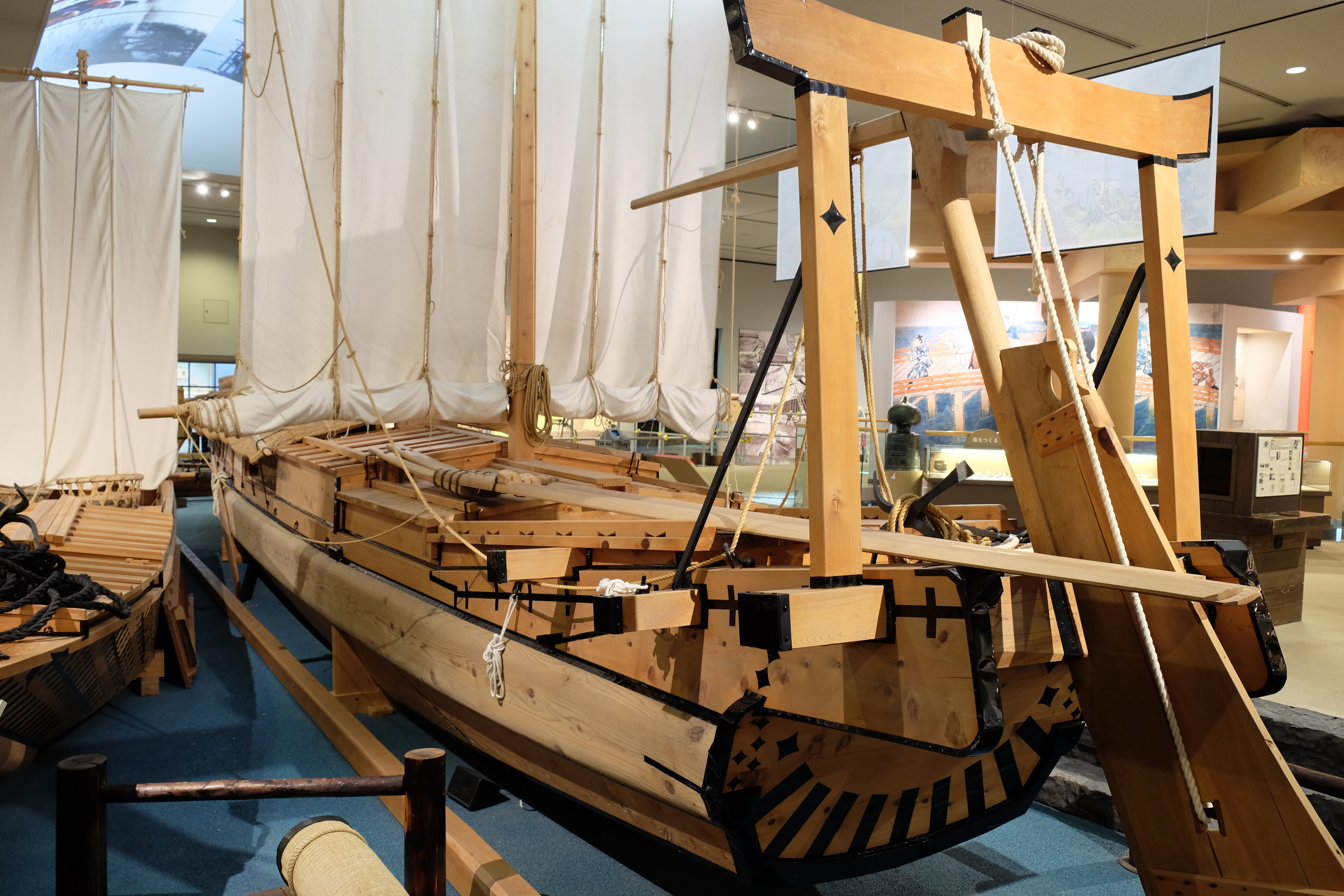
The stern of a 'maruko-bune' cargo boat. An exhibit at the Lake Biwa Museum, Shiga Prefecture, Japan.

A maruko-bune (丸子船) is a type of traditional wooden sailing boat, the design of which is unique to the Lake Biwa region, Shiga Prefecture, Japan. The name is related to the rounded shape of the hulls in cross section, "maru" meaning round in Japanese. Maruko-bune were in regular use in the Edo Period transporting cargo on Lake Biwa as part of one of the main historical transportation routes of Japan. Later, their numbers declined, but they were still in regular use in the 1930s, and a small number were used into the 1960s.

== Uses and decline ==
Maruko-bune were primarily cargo boats, and played an important role in transporting goods during the Edo period. During this period, a major transport route in Japan included shipping goods from northern areas to Wakasa Bay on the Sea of Japan coast. From there they were taken overland to the ports along the northern shores of Lake Biwa and loaded onto maruko-bune. The maruko-bune then sailed south on the lake to the port of Otsu, a distance of approximately 60 km (37 miles), from where the cargo would be unloaded and taken by land to Kyoto. During their heyday in the Edo period, over 1,300 maruko-bune were working on the lake. Maruko-bune declined in numbers after 1672 with the establishment of a sea transportation route to Osaka via the Shimonoseki Strait and Seto Inland Sea, but there were still over 1,000 in operation on Lake Biwa at any one time until the end of the eighteenth century. The introduction of rail transportation around the lake in 1889 decreased their numbers considerably, but hundreds were still in use in the 1930s and a few were used into the 1960s for transporting goods locally. One maruko-bune, fitted with an engine, was retired in the late 1990s. The end to maruko-bune production, which occurred in the 1930s, was related to the decline in the availability of suitable wood. This was caused by a loss of foresters who knew where to source suitable timbers from the mountains surrounding the lake.

== Construction ==
Maruko-bune are characterised by their rounded hulls in cross section, designed to maximise the amount of cargo they could carry without increasing draft. They were constructed with wood: Podocarpus for the bow, stern and side planking, Japanese cedar for the bottom planking, and cypress for the mast and components above deck. Two halves of a longitudinal-sawn Japanese cedar log were built into the length of the boat, one half each side, to give it stability in the often choppy waters of the lake and to act as rubrails. The planking was edge-nailed together and tree bark was used for caulking. The bow section was sharply angled and consisted of narrow planks, resembling the staves of a barrel. The bow and other parts of the boat were decorated with copper plates coated with a mixture of charcoal and rapeseed oil in a traditional pattern. The mast was square in cross section, and could be lowered when not in use. The cargo capacity of maruko-bune ranged from 30 to 300 koku (1 koku = 180 L), although most had a capacity of 80 to 100 koku. A maruko-bune with a capacity of 100 koku was about 19 m long with a mast 12 m high

A 19 m long (100 koku) maruko-bune was constructed between 1992 and 1995 for an exhibit of the Lake Biwa Museum, Shiga Prefecture, Japan. The construction was supervised by Sanshiro Matsui, who was 80 years old in 1992, and who had worked in a maruko-bune boatyard during his youth.

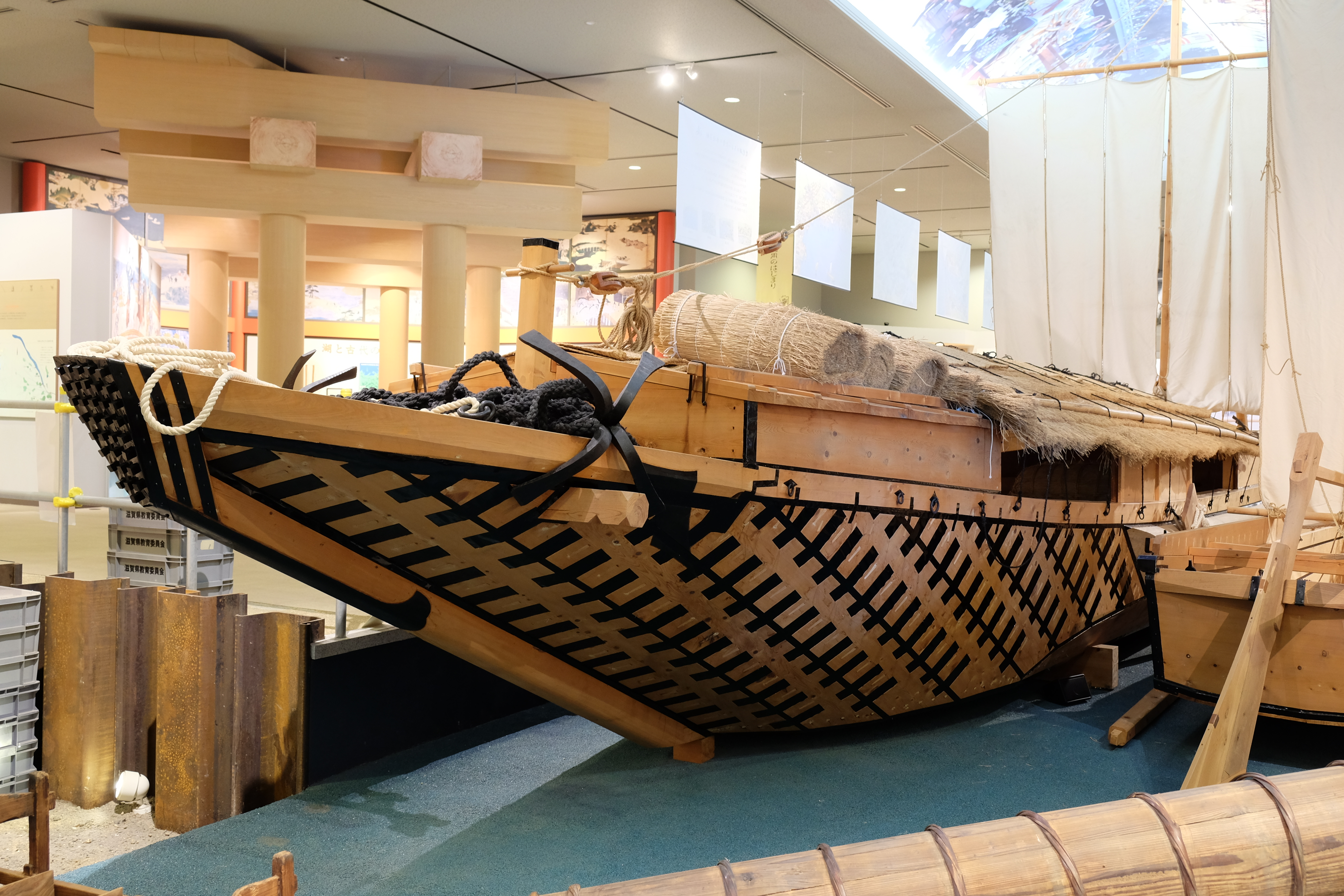
The bow of a 'maruko-bune' cargo boat. An exhibit at the Lake Biwa Museum, Shiga Prefecture, Japan.

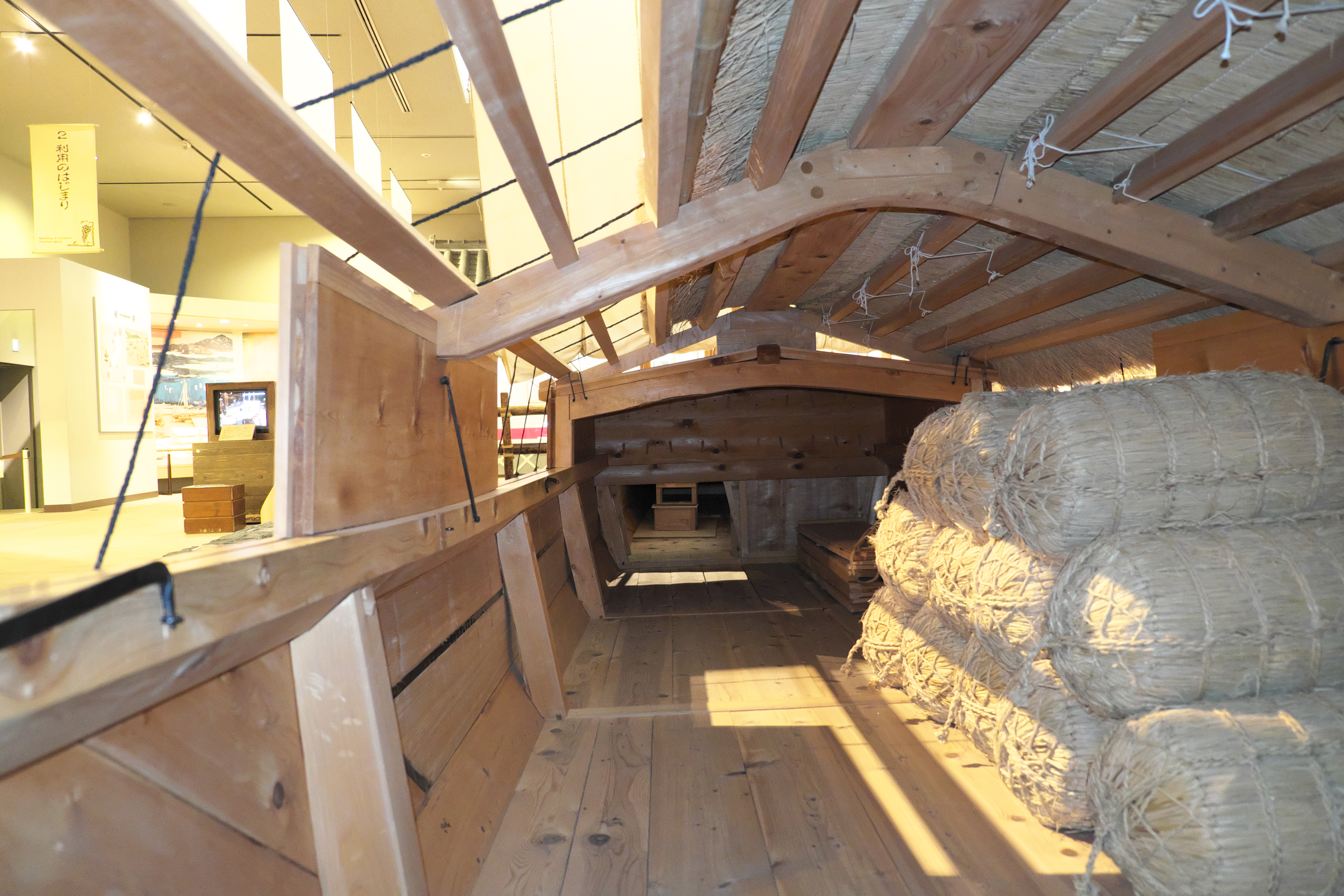
The inside of a 'maruko-bune' cargo boat. An exhibit at the Lake Biwa Museum, Shiga Prefecture, Japan.
