= List of dams in Fukushima Prefecture =

The following is a list of dams in Fukushima Prefecture, Japan.

== List ==
Name	Location	Opened	Height (metres)	Image
Akasaka Dam			18.3	
Akimotoko Dam		1999	10.6	
Asahi Dam			16.1	
Dake Dam			60	
Fujikura Dam			36.5	
Fujinuma Dam		1949		
Fukada Dam			55.5	
Futamata Dam			30	
Hatori Dam		1956	37.1	
Higashiyama Dam			70	
Honna Dam		1954	51.5	
Horai Dam			21.5	
Horikawa Dam				
Iritono Dam				
Iwabe Dam				
Jurokkyo Dam				
Kaminojiri Dam		1958	30	
Katakado Dam		1953	29	
Kodama Dam			102	
Komachi Dam			37	
Konosu Dam			23.5	
Kuromori Dam			20.2	
Mano Dam			69	
Matsugabo Dam			46	
Miharu Dam		1997	65	
Miyakawa Dam			42	
Miyashita Dam		1946	53	
Modo Dam			22	
Nishigo Dam			32.5	
Nitchu Dam				
Notekami Dam				
Ogaki Dam				
Ogi Dam			27.8	
Okawa Dam		1988		
Okusagawa Dam				
Okutadami Dam		1961	157	
Otori Dam		1963	83	
Otsumata Dam			52	
Ouchi Dam		1991	102	
Ozaso Dam			27.2	
Ryui Dam			32.5	
Sakashita Dam			43	
Sekishiba Dam			20	
Sengosawa Dam				
Shingo Dam			27.5	
Shin-Miyakawa Dam			69	
Shinobu Dam			21.5	
Shitoki Dam			83.5	
Surikamigawa Dam			105	
Tadami Dam		1989	30	
Tajima Dam			36	
Takashiba Dam			59.5	
Taki Dam		1961	46	
Tagokura Dam		1959	145	
Takanokura Dam			54.2	
Tetsuzan Dam			25.2	
Tochizawa Dam			23.7	
Uwada Dam		1954	34	
Yamanoiri Dam			29.5	
Yamasato Dam			22.5	
Yanaizu Dam		1953	34	
Yokokawa Dam			78.5	
Yoshigadaira Dam			22.5	

== See also ==
- Media related to Dams in Fukushima prefecture at Wikimedia Commons
