= Shimogo Pumped Storage Power Station =

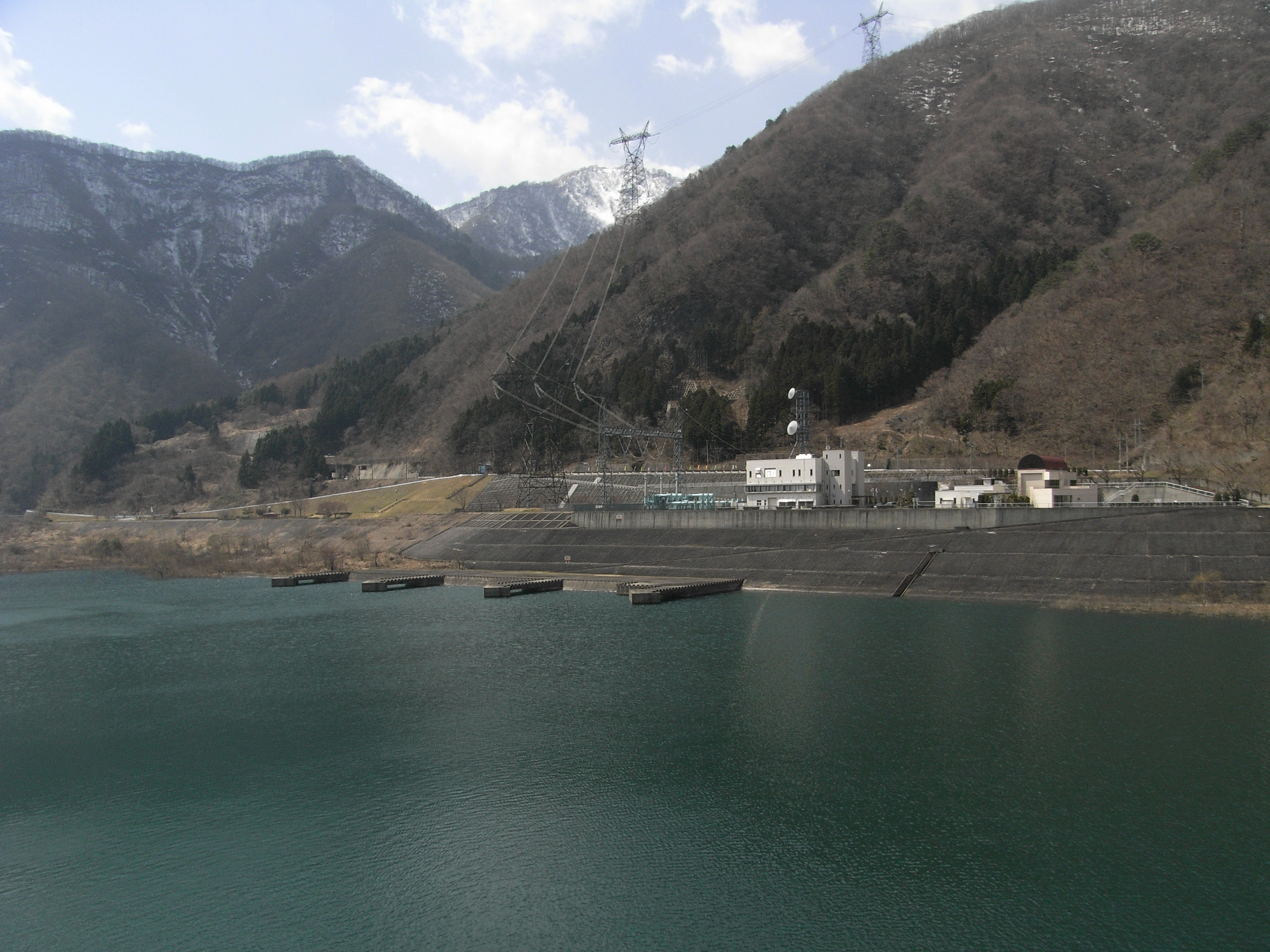
- Interactive map of Shimogo Pumped Storage Power Station
- Country: Japan
- Location: Shimogō, Minamiaizu, Fukushima Prefecture
- Coordinates: 37°20′42.2″N 139°54′30.0″E
- Status: Operational
- Construction began: 1974
- Opening date: 1988; 1991 (complete)
- Operator: J-Power

Upper reservoir
- Creates: Ouchi Dam Reservoir
- Total capacity: 18,500,000 m^{3} (15,000 acre⋅ft) (total); 16,000,000 m^{3} (13,000 acre⋅ft) (usable)

Lower reservoir
- Creates: Wakasato Lake
- Total capacity: 57,500,000 m^{3} (46,600 acre⋅ft) (total); 44,500,000 m^{3} (36,100 acre⋅ft) (usable)

Power Station
- Hydraulic head: 387 m (1,270 ft)
- Pump-generators: 4 x 250 MW reversible Francis turbines
- Installed capacity: 1,000 MW (1,300,000 hp)

The Shimogo Pumped Storage Power Station (Japanese: 下郷発電所, Hepburn: Shimogō Hatsudensho) is a large pumped-storage hydroelectric power plant in Shimogō, Minamiaizu, Fukushima Prefecture, Japan. With an installed capacity of 1,000 megawatts (1,300,000 hp), the system is one of the largest pumped-storage power stations in Japan.

The facility is run by Electric Power Development Company (J-Power). Like most pumped-storage facilities, the power station uses two reservoirs, releasing and pumping as the demand rises and falls. The Ouchi Dam Reservoir, formed by the Ouchi Dam, is the upper artificial reservoir, while Okawa Dam forms the lower reservoir.

Ogawa Dam is a rockfill-concrete gravity combined dam, with a height of 75 m and a length of 406 m. Construction on the dam started in 1971 and was completed in 1987. The dam is also used for flood control, irrigation, and domestic and industrial water supply. Ouchi Dam is a rockfill dam with a height of 102 m and a length of 340 m. Construction started in 1974 and was completed in 1991. The power plant employs four 250 MW pump/generator units, for a total net capacity of 1000 MW. The maximum water flow is 314 cubic meters per second. Unit 1 and 2 became operational in April 1988 after the completion of the Okawa Dam. Units 3 and 4 were commissioned in 1991.

The station includes a visitor center with a model of the power station and media to explain its operation.

A smaller conventional hydroelectric power plant, the Ogawa hydroelectric power plant (大川発電所, Ogawa Hatsudensho) is in operation downstream of Ogawa Dam since May 1986. The plant, operated by Tohoku Electric Power Company, has an installed capacity of 21 MW and an effective head of 56 m. The maximum water flow is 45 cubic meter per second. The plant operates with a single Kaplan turbine.

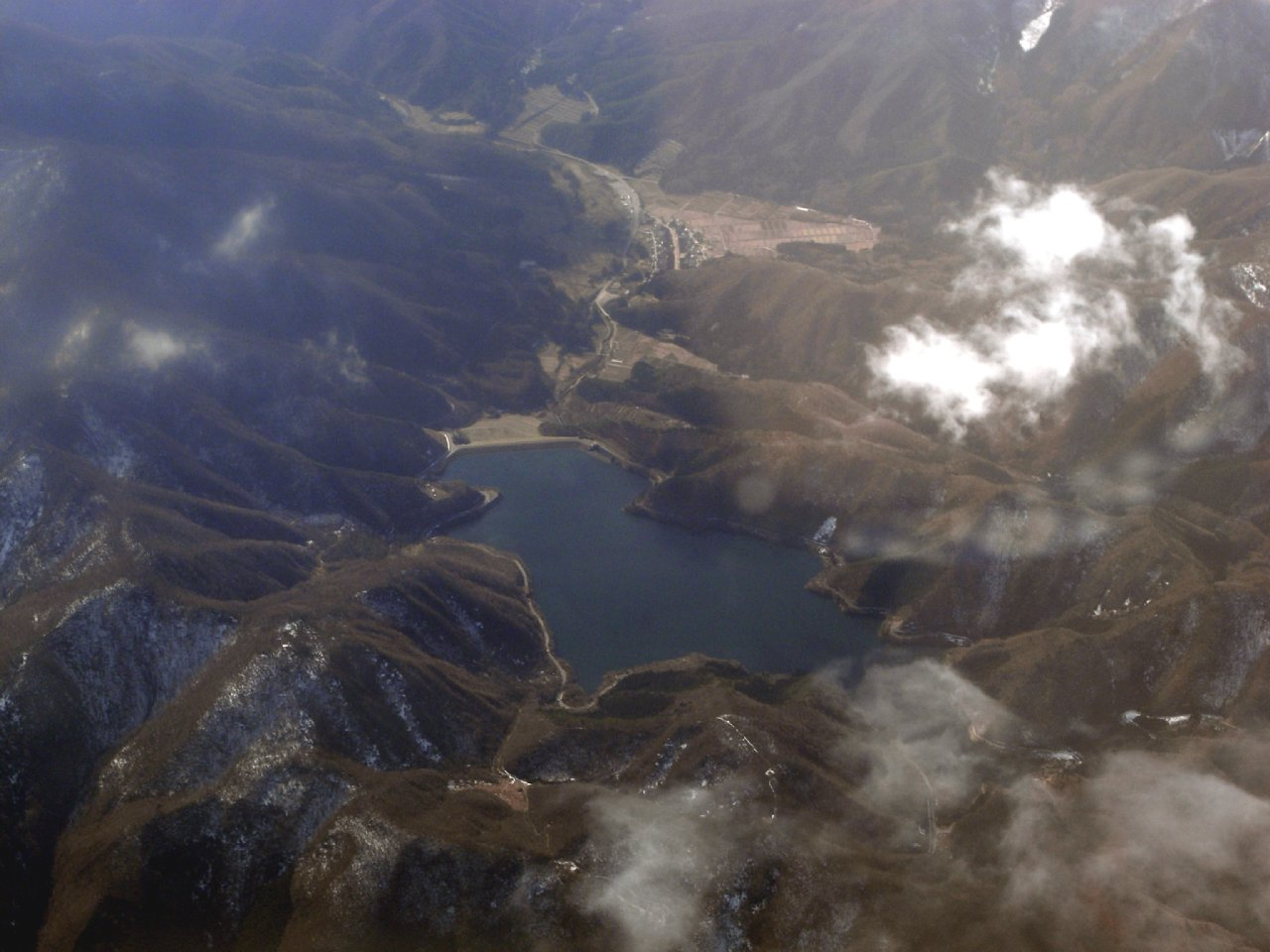
The Ouchi Dam upper reservoir

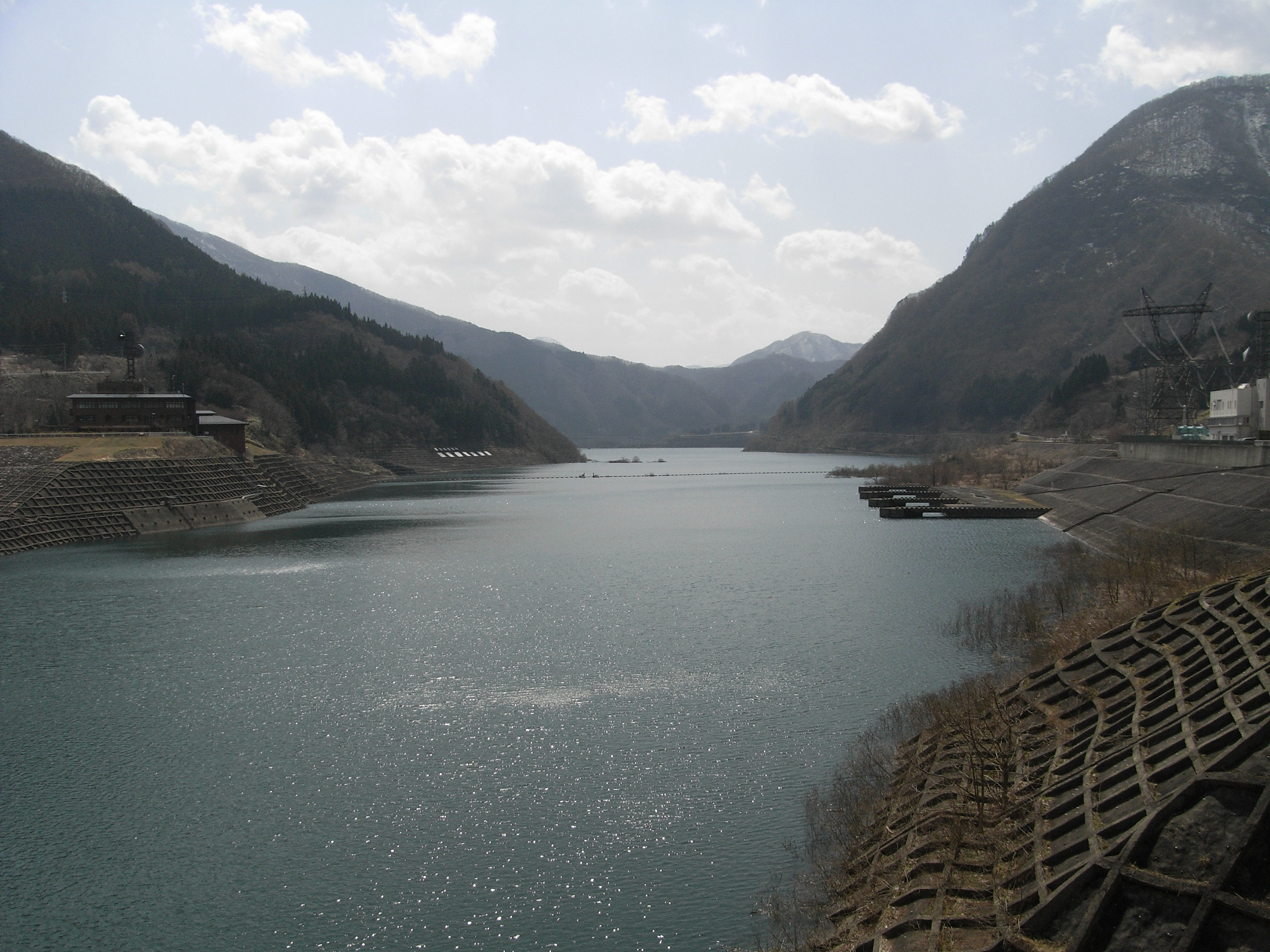
Wakasato Lake (lower reservoir)

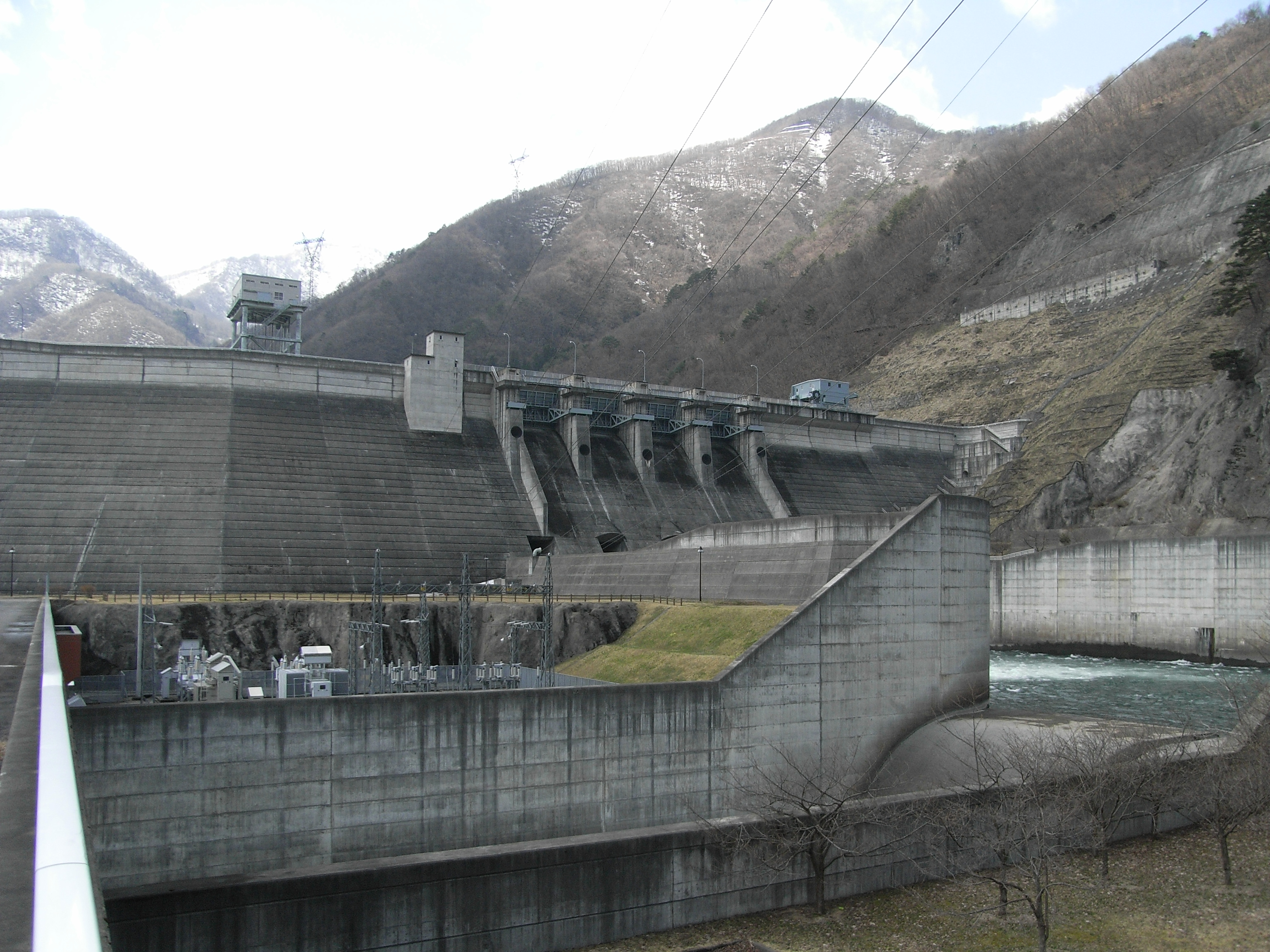
Okawa Dam, at the lower reservoir

== See also ==
- List of power stations in Japan
- Hydroelectricity in Japan
- List of pumped-storage hydroelectric power stations
