= Yanosuke Hirai =

Japanese civil engineer

Yanosuke Hirai Junior Fourth Rank
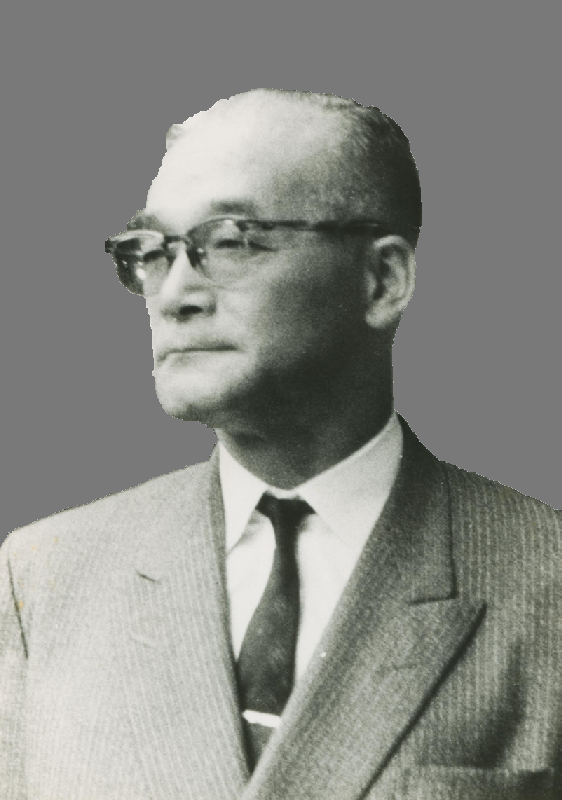
- Born: May 16, 1902; Shibata, Miyagi, Japan
- Died: February 21, 1986 (aged 83)

Yanosuke Hirai (平井 弥之助, Hirai Yanosuke; May 16, 1902 – February 21, 1986) was a Japanese civil engineer and corporate executive in the electric power industry. He developed electric power generation in the Tohoku region during the Shōwa era with unusual foresight and a deep sense of responsibility. 25 years after his death, Hirai’s foresight protected lives and environment from the March 11, 2011 Tohoku earthquake and tsunami. The Onagawa Nuclear Power Plant (Miyagi Prefecture), designed and built under his watch, was the sole plant in the region that fully resisted the disaster of March 11, 2011: all of its three reactors successfully withstood the seismic event and subsequent tsunami, shutting down safely as designed and virtually without any incident. The site of the plant even ended up providing a refuge for three months to more than 300 neighboring people who had lost their homes.

== Main achievements – Risk management for earthquakes and tsunamis ==
As the following two examples show, Yanosuke Hirai, based on his convictions as an engineer and his sense of responsibility as a member of the electric power industry, insisted on the importance of taking highly precautionary protective measures against earthquakes and tsunamis. Born in the Miyagi Prefecture, Hirai was keenly aware of how dreadful earthquakes and tsunamis could be; he is said to have often made reference to the great Jogan tsunami of the year 869, which had reportedly travelled 7 kilometers inland from the coast, and had even reached the Sengan Shinto shrine in Iwanuma, his birth town.

1. During the construction of a thermal power station in Niigata in 1957, he considered the risk of soil liquefaction being caused by an earthquake and ordered a 12 meters deep caisson (a reinforced concrete box, or so-called raft foundation) on which the thermal station was erected .
  In 1964, the Niigata earthquake in fact caused soil liquefaction of 10 meters deep, vindicating the usefulness of Hirai’s ‘mammoth’ caisson which, at the time of construction, had seemed excessive for some experts. Just after the earthquake, when a TV reported, with an image of a building on fire, that the Niigata thermal power station had exploded, Y. Matsunaga, the so-called “King of Electric Power of Japan” immediately retorted: “That’s a mistake. The power station Hirai constructed cannot be broken.” In fact, it was a case of misreporting and there was no damage; the main body of the power station only sank 20 centimeters just perpendicularly.
2. In 1968, Tohoku Electric Power established a committee to prepare the construction plan of the Onagawa nuclear power plant (NPP). As a member of the committee, Hirai was the only one to insist, after examination of past tsunami records, that the plant be built 14.8 m above the sea level. Although the height proposed by Hirai was five times as much as the then generally assumed expected height of a tsunami at Onagawa, the Tohoku Electric Power management consented to his proposal. Moreover, he devised a safety measure for a tsunami’s withdrawal: an inlet channel and a reservoir containing enough seawater for cooling the nuclear reactors during 40 minutes. The construction of the three nuclear reactors of the Onagawa NPP was completed in 2002.
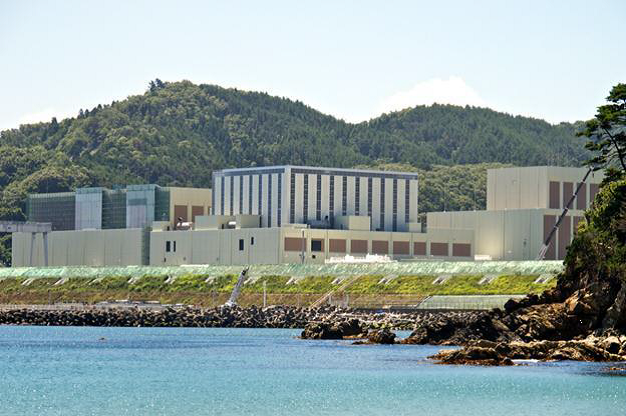
  Onagawa Nuclear Power Station in 2012 (Photo by IAEA Mission to Onagawa NPS)
  On March 11, 2011, the Onagawa NPP was hit by the Tohoku earthquake and tsunami (magnitude 9.0). In contrast to the Fukushima Daiichi NPP, which experienced a meltdown of three of the plant’s six nuclear reactors, all three reactors of the Onagawa NPP which was closer to the epicenter of the earthquake and endured stronger quake and same tsunami level — survived virtually intact. Waves of 13.78 m high (12.78 m of wave height and 1 m of land subsidence) attacked the NPP, but did not reach it by 1 m.
  An IAEA mission to Onagawa NPP presented a 92-page report to the government of Japan, after collecting earthquake experience data from 30 July to 11 August 2012 at Onagawa. The report concludes as follows:

“Despite prolonged ground shaking and a significant level of seismic energy input to [its] facilities, the structures, systems and components of the Onagawa nuclear power station performed their intended functions without any significant damage. The lack of any serious damage to all classes of seismically designed facilities attests to the robustness of these facilities under severe seismic ground shaking.”

== Personality ==
One of Hirai’s former staff members testifies as follows. “Hirai was a man with a strict sense of responsibility. He was strongly convinced that an engineer must take responsibility for the whole chain of consequences of his decisions, and that mere compliance with the letter of the law or regulations would not provide him a reasonable excuse.”

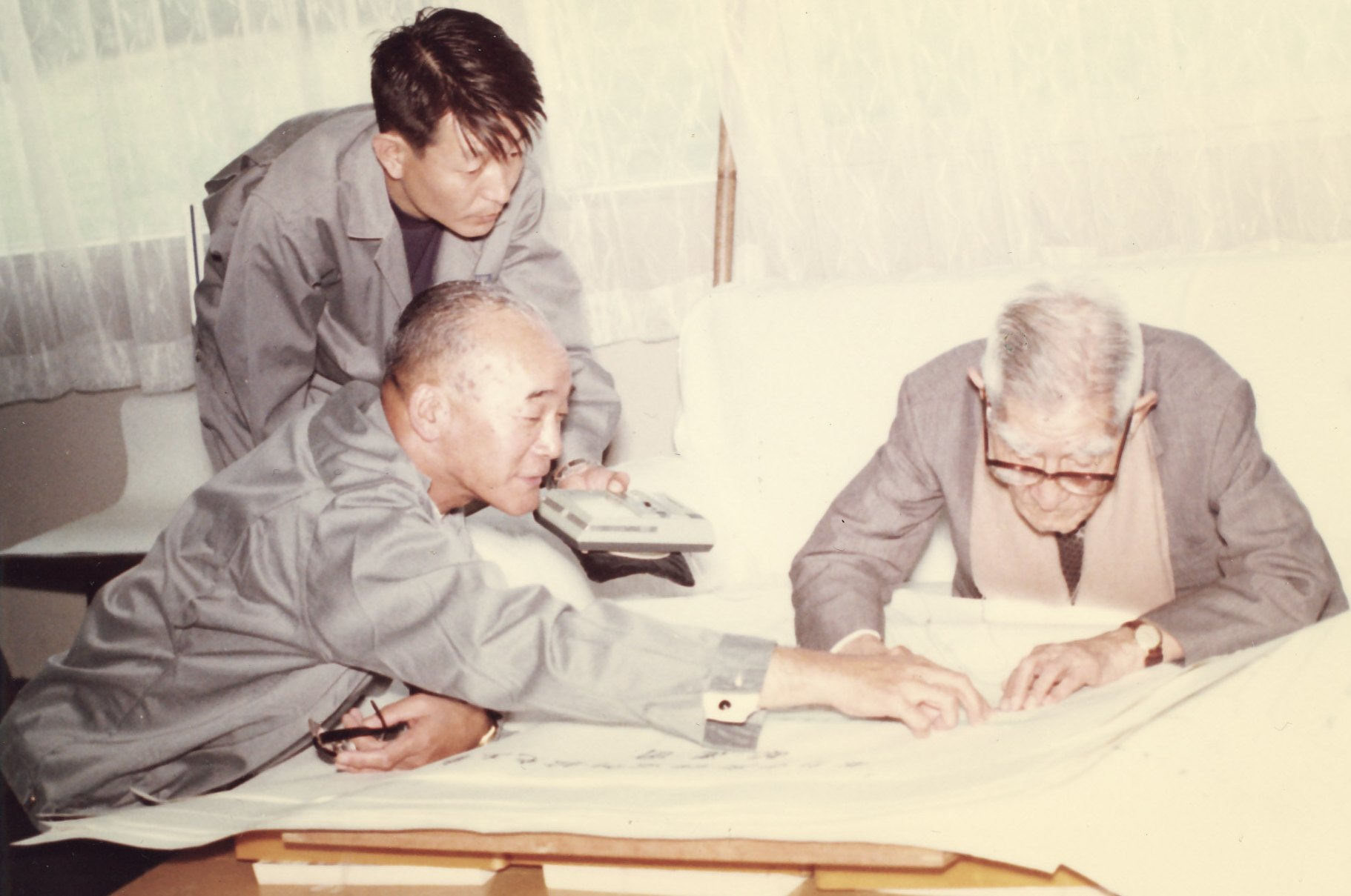
With Yasuzaemon Matsunaga (right)

The origin of Hirai’s deep, uncompromising sense of responsibility as a power engineer may be found in the conviction he shared with of Y. Matsunaga, the above-mentioned “King of Electric Power of Japan”, who maintained that, because electric power was the foundation of social life and industry, its safe production at the lowest cost and without any discontinuity was ‘their’ duty.

Hirai also had an uncanny capacity to convince others to adopt his point of view by clearly articulating and backing up the arguments for it. This was shown by his success, both in the Niigata and Onagawa cases, in securing collective decisions in favor of a much higher level of precaution than other experts would have advocated. In the groupthink atmosphere that prevails in many large enterprises in Japan, this was no small feat.

== Career ==
- 1902 Born in Shibata, Miyagi Prefecture, Japan.
- 1926 Graduates in Civil Engineering at the Faculty of Engineering of Tokyo Imperial University (now the University of Tokyo) after completing Daini Senior High School (old system) in Sendai.
- 1926 Joins Toho Electric Power Company, Director at the Construction Site of Kawabe Hydroelectric Power Plant (Hida River), Works under the guidance of Yasuzaemon Matsunaga .
- 1941 Joins Japan Electric Generation and Transmission Company (Nihon Hassōden) (jp:日本発送電), Director at the Construction Site of the Kurobe Hydroelectric Power Plant (Oku-nikko).
- 1945 Successively Head of the Civil Engineering Section, Manager of Civil Engineering Department and Member of the board of directors at the Headquarters of Nihon Hassōden, takes a leading part in the postwar reconstruction of electric power generation of Japan.

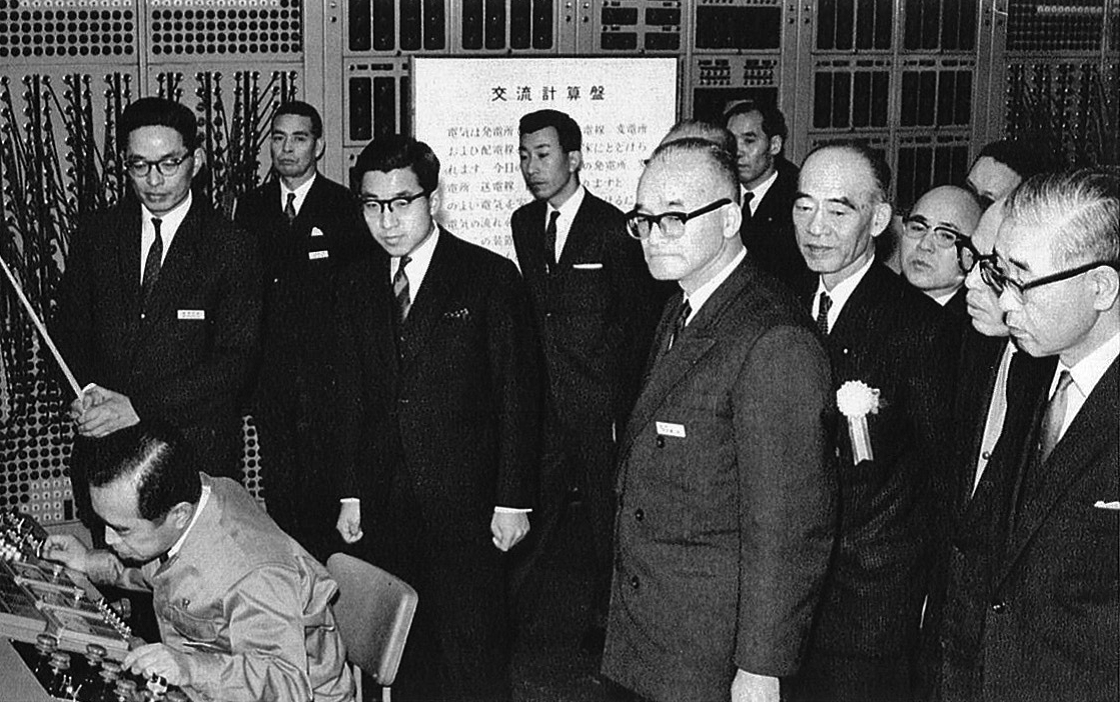
Yanosuke Hirai (near, central) guiding Emperor Akihito (then His Imperial Highness the Crown Prince) who visited the CRIEPI (Komae) in 1965.

- 1951 Serves simultaneously as Director of Construction Bureau, Manager of the Department of Civil Engineering and Member of the board of directors of Tohoku Electric Power Company. Under company president Jiro Shirasu, dedicates himself to the development of electric power plants in the Tohoku district, being in charge of the Tadami River hydroelectric project and introduction of large-scale thermal power stations. Commissioned by the Electric Power Development Company (J-POWER), works as Director in the construction project of the largest hydroelectric power plant in Japan, the Tagokura Dam.
- 1960 Vice-president of Tohoku Electric Power Company.
- 1963 Member of the board of directors, subsequently Vice President, at the Central Research Institute of Electric Power Industry (CRIEPI) and Director of its Laboratory of Technology.
- 1968 Member of the Coast Facility Planning Committee, Tohoku Electric Power Company.
- 1975 Retires from CRIEPI, becoming Adviser.
- 1986 Dies at the age of 83.

== Awards ==
- 1961 Medals of Honor (Japan) with Blue Ribbon (藍綬褒章).
- 1972 3rd Class, Gold Rays with Neck Ribbon, Order of the Rising Sun（勲三等旭日中綬章）
- 1986 Jushii (Junior Fourth Rank 従四位)
