= Tadami =

Tadami (written: 只見) may refer to:

- Tadami, Fukushima (只見町, Tadami-machi), town in Minamiaizu District, Fukushima Prefecture, Japan
- Tadami Station (只見駅, Tadami-eki), train station in Tadami, Fukushima
- Tadami River (只見川, Tadami-gawa), river in Fukushima Prefecture, Japan
- Tadami Dam, dam on the Tadami River, Fukushima Prefecture, Japan
- Tadami Line (只見線, Tadami-sen), railway line in Fukushima and Niigata Prefecture, Japan

== People with the given name ==
- Mibu no Tadami (壬生 忠見), Japanese poet
- Tadami Ueno (born 1948), Japanese golfer
