= Taki Dam =

Taki Dam may refer to:

- Taki Dam (Fukushima)
- Taki Dam (Iwate)
