= Okutadami Dam =

Dam in Fukushima Prefecture, Japan

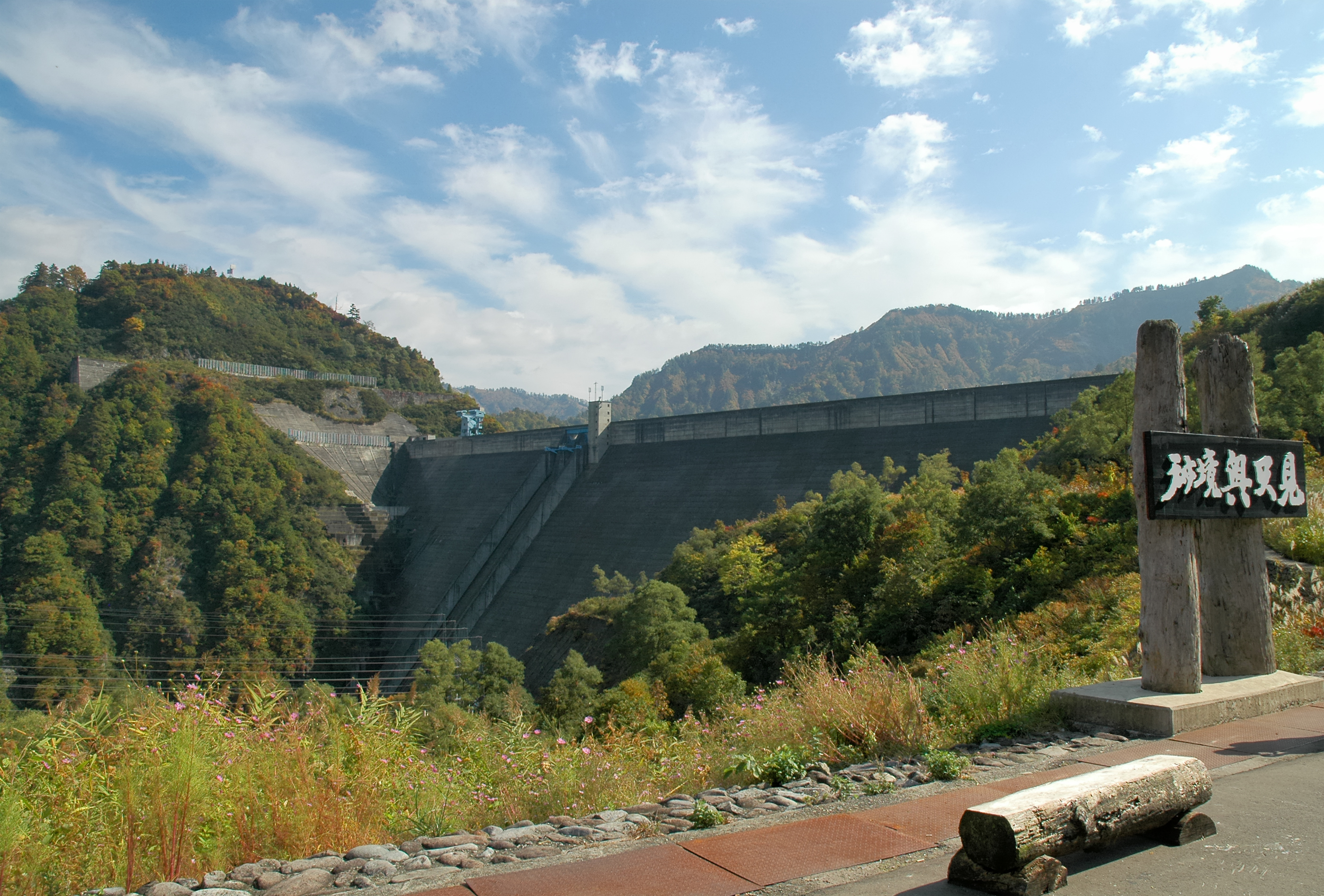

- Location within Japan
- Country: Japan
- Location: Uonuma
- Coordinates: 37°09′12″N 139°15′00″E
- Construction began: 1953
- Opening date: 1961
- Owner: Electric Power Development Company

Dam and spillways
- Type of dam: Gravity
- Impounds: Tadami River
- Height: 157 m (515 ft)
- Length: 475 m (1,558 ft)
- Dam volume: 1,636,000 m^{3} (2,139,807 cu yd)

Reservoir
- Creates: Lake Okutadami
- Total capacity: 601,000,000 m^{3} (487,239 acre⋅ft)
- Active capacity: 458,000,000 m^{3} (371,307 acre⋅ft)
- Catchment area: 595 km^{2} (230 sq mi)
- Surface area: 1,150 ha (2,842 acres)
- Normal elevation: 750 m (2,461 ft)

Power Station
- Commission date: 1960, 2003
- Hydraulic head: 120 MW units: 170 m (558 ft); 200 MW unit: 164.2 m (539 ft)
- Turbines: 3 x 120 MW, 1 x 200 MW Francis-type
- Installed capacity: 560 MW

The Okutadami Dam (奥只見ダム) is a concrete gravity dam on the Tadami River, 26 km (16 mi) east of Uonuma on the border of Niigata and Fukushima Prefectures, Japan. The primary purpose of the dam is hydroelectric power generation and it supports a 560 MW power station which is the largest conventional hydroelectric power station in Japan. The dam also forms the second largest reservoir in Japan, next to that of the Tokuyama Dam.

== Background ==
Construction on the dam began and its original 390 MW power station was commissioned 2 December 1960. The rest of the project was complete in 1961. Between 1999 and 2003, the power station was expanded, adding 200 MW in installed capacity. In addition, a 2.7 MW generator was added to ensure a flow of 2.5 m^{3}/s (88 cu ft/s) downstream for environmental purposes. Along with the same power plant upgrade, a second Kaplan turbine-generator was added to the 83 m (272 ft) tall Otori Dam's power station downstream at 37°12′53″N 139°12′50″E. This generator has an 87 MW capacity in addition to the existing 95 MW unit, for an installed capacity of 182 MW.

36 houses were submerged.

== Design ==
The Okutadami Dam is a 157 m (515 ft) tall and 475 m (1,558 ft) long concrete gravity dam with a structural volume of 1,636,000 m^{3} (2,139,807 cu yd). Sitting at the head of a 595 km^{2} (230 sq mi) catchment area, the dam creates a reservoir with a 601,000,000 m^{3} (487,239 acre⋅ft) capacity of which 458,000,000 m^{3} (371,307 acre⋅ft) is active (or "useful") storage. The reservoir has a surface area of 1,150 ha (2,842 acres). The power station is underground and located on the right bank of the river next to the dam's abutment. It consists of two caverns, one for the original power station and another adjacent for the expansion. After being received by the dam's intake, water supplied to the original power plant travels down three penstocks 185–189 m (607–620 ft) in length before reaching an individual 120 MW Francis turbine-generator. The 200 MW Francis turbine-generator receives water via a 280 m (919 ft) long penstock. After water is processed through the generators, it travels down two tailrace tunnels before being discharged over 3 km (2 mi) downstream at the upstream edge of the Otori Reservoir.

== Access ==
Minami Echigo Kankō Bus ( Okutadami Dam Line and Express Okutadami Dam Line )

- Ginzan Daira bus stop
  - For Urasa Station
    - It takes to 2h35m from Tokyo Station to Urasa Station.
    - It takes 1h40m from Niigata Station to Urasa Station.

Aizu Bus (Nakayama Tōge and Oze Line - No.011)

- Ozeguchi bus stop
  - For Oze-Oike bus stop or Numayama toge bus stop
    - When passengers want to go to Aizukōgen-Ozeguchi Station you must transfer onto route bus at Numayama Tōge bus stop or Oze-Oike bus stop.
    - It takes 2h40m from Asakusa Station to Aizukōgen-Ozeguchi Station, when you use Tobu Limited Express Revaty Aizu.
