= Taki Dam (Fukushima) =

Dam in Fukushima Prefecture, Japan

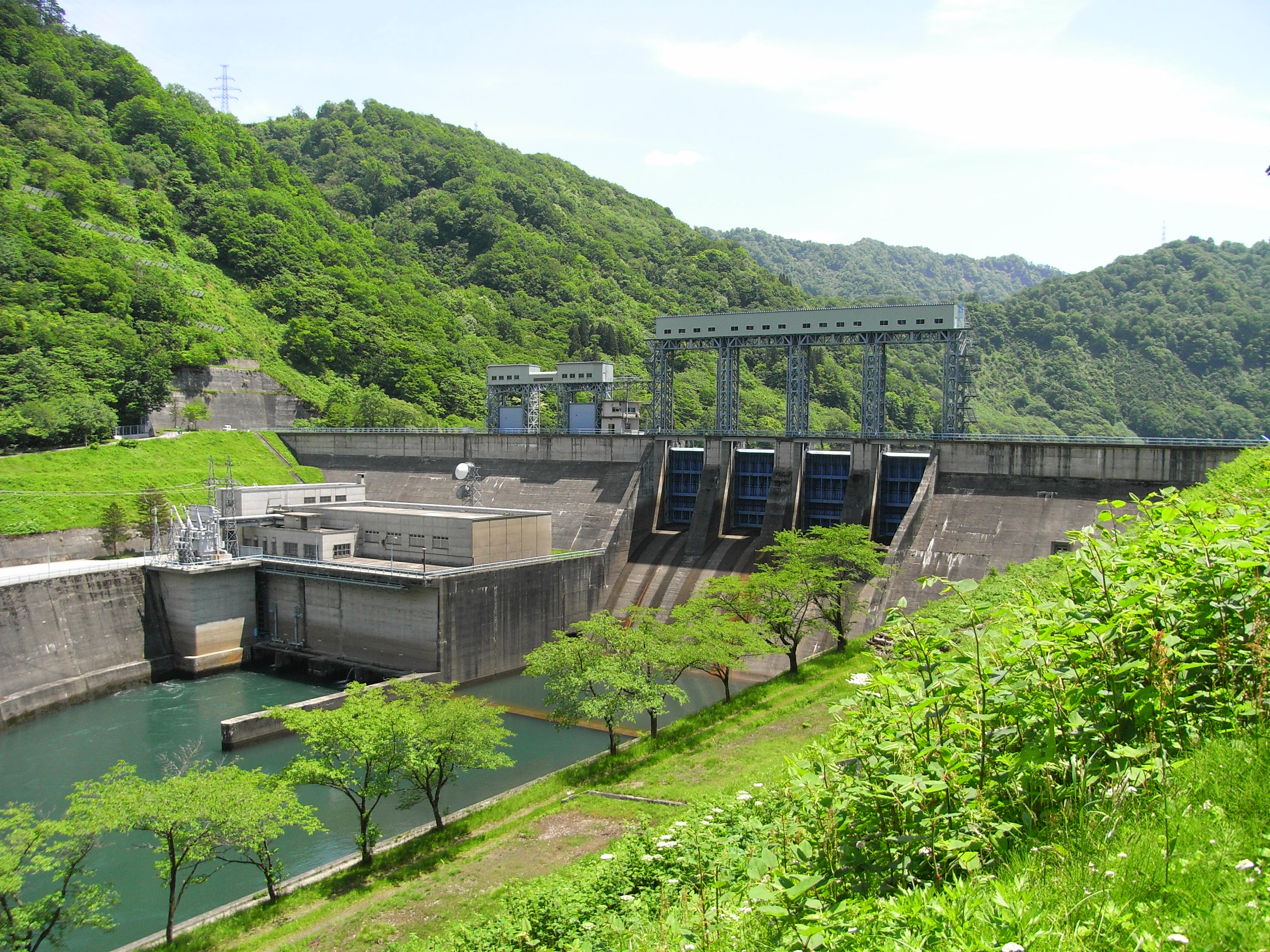

- Location within Japan
- Location: Tadami
- Coordinates: 37°23′13″N 139°23′02″E
- Construction began: 1959
- Opening date: 1961
- Owner: Electric Power Development Company

Dam and spillways
- Type of dam: Concrete gravity
- Impounds: Tadami River
- Height: 46 m (151 ft)
- Length: 264 m (866 ft)
- Dam volume: 120,343 m^{3} (157,403 cu yd)
- Spillway capacity: 200 m^{3}/s (7,063 cu ft/s)

Reservoir
- Total capacity: 27,000,000 m^{3} (21,889 acre⋅ft)
- Active capacity: 10,300,000 m^{3} (8,350 acre⋅ft)
- Catchment area: 1,978 km^{2} (764 sq mi)
- Surface area: 2.30 km^{2} (1 sq mi)

Power Station
- Commission date: 1961
- Hydraulic head: 35.82 m (118 ft)
- Turbines: 2 x 46 MW Kaplan-type
- Installed capacity: 92 MW

Taki Dam (滝ダム) is a gravity dam on the Tadami River, 7.3 km (5 mi) east of Tadami in Fukushima Prefecture, Japan. Surveys for the dam were carried out in 1958, construction began in 1959 and the dam was complete in 1961. The primary purpose of the dam is hydroelectric power generation and it supports a 92 MW power station consisting of 2 x 46 MW Kaplan turbines. The dam is 46 m (151 ft) tall and 264 m (866 ft) long. It creates a reservoir with a 27,000,000 m^{3} (21,889 acre⋅ft) capacity, of which 10,300,000 m^{3} (8,350 acre⋅ft) is active (or "useful") for power generation. The dam's spillway is controlled by four sluice gates and has a 200 m^{3}/s (7,063 cu ft/s) discharge capacity.

== See also ==
- Honna Dam – located downstream
- Tadami Dam – located upstream
