= Otori Dam =

Dam in Fukushima Prefecture, Japan

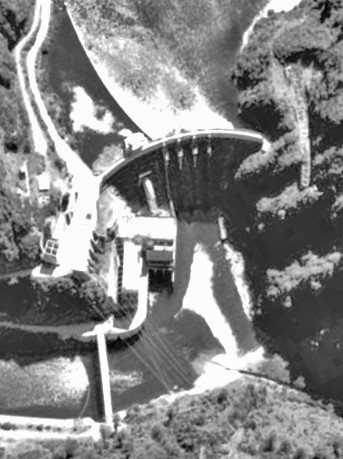
- The dam in 1976

- Location within Japan
- Country: Japan
- Location: Tadami
- Coordinates: 37°12′53″N 139°12′50″E
- Status: Operational
- Construction began: 1961
- Opening date: 1963
- Owner: Electric Power Development Company

Dam and spillways
- Type of dam: Arch-gravity
- Impounds: Tadami River
- Height: 83 m (272 ft)
- Length: 188 m (617 ft)

Reservoir
- Total capacity: 15,800,000 m^{3} (12,809 acre⋅ft)
- Active capacity: 5,000,000 m^{3} (4,054 acre⋅ft)
- Catchment area: 656.9 km^{2} (254 sq mi)
- Surface area: 89 ha (220 acres)

Power Station
- Commission date: 1963, 2003
- Hydraulic head: Unit 1: 50.8 m (167 ft); Unit 2: 48.1 m (158 ft)
- Turbines: 1 x 95 MW, 1 x 87 MW Kaplan-type
- Installed capacity: 182 MW

The Otori Dam (大鳥ダム, Ōtori damu) is a concrete arch-gravity dam on the Tadami River, 17 km (11 mi) southwest of Tadami in Fukushima Prefecture, Japan. The primary purpose of the dam is hydroelectric power generation and it supports a 182 MW power station. The power station contains two Kaplan turbine-generators. Unit 1 (95 MW) was commissioned on 20 November 1963 while Unit 2 (87 MW) was commissioned on 7 June 2003 as part of a power plant expansion project that included an additional 200 MW generator at Okutadami Dam upstream. The dam is 83 m (272 ft) tall and 188 m (617 ft) long. Its reservoir has a 15,800,000 m^{3} (12,809 acre⋅ft) capacity of which 5,000,000 m^{3} (4,054 acre⋅ft) is active (or "useful") for power generation. The reservoir has a catchment area of 656.9 km^{2} (254 sq mi) and surface area of 89 ha (220 acres). Of the two generators, Unit 1 has a maximum effective hydraulic head of 50.8 m (167 ft) and Unit 2 is afforded 48.1 m (158 ft). The design flood discharge of the dam is 2,200 m^{3}/s (77,692 cu ft/s) and its service spillway is controlled by three tainter gates.

== See also ==
- List of power stations in Japan
- Tagokura Dam – located downstream
