= Okawa Dam =

Okawa Dam may refer to:

- Okawa Dam (Fukushima)
- Okawa Dam (Kagawa)
