= Sakashita Dam =

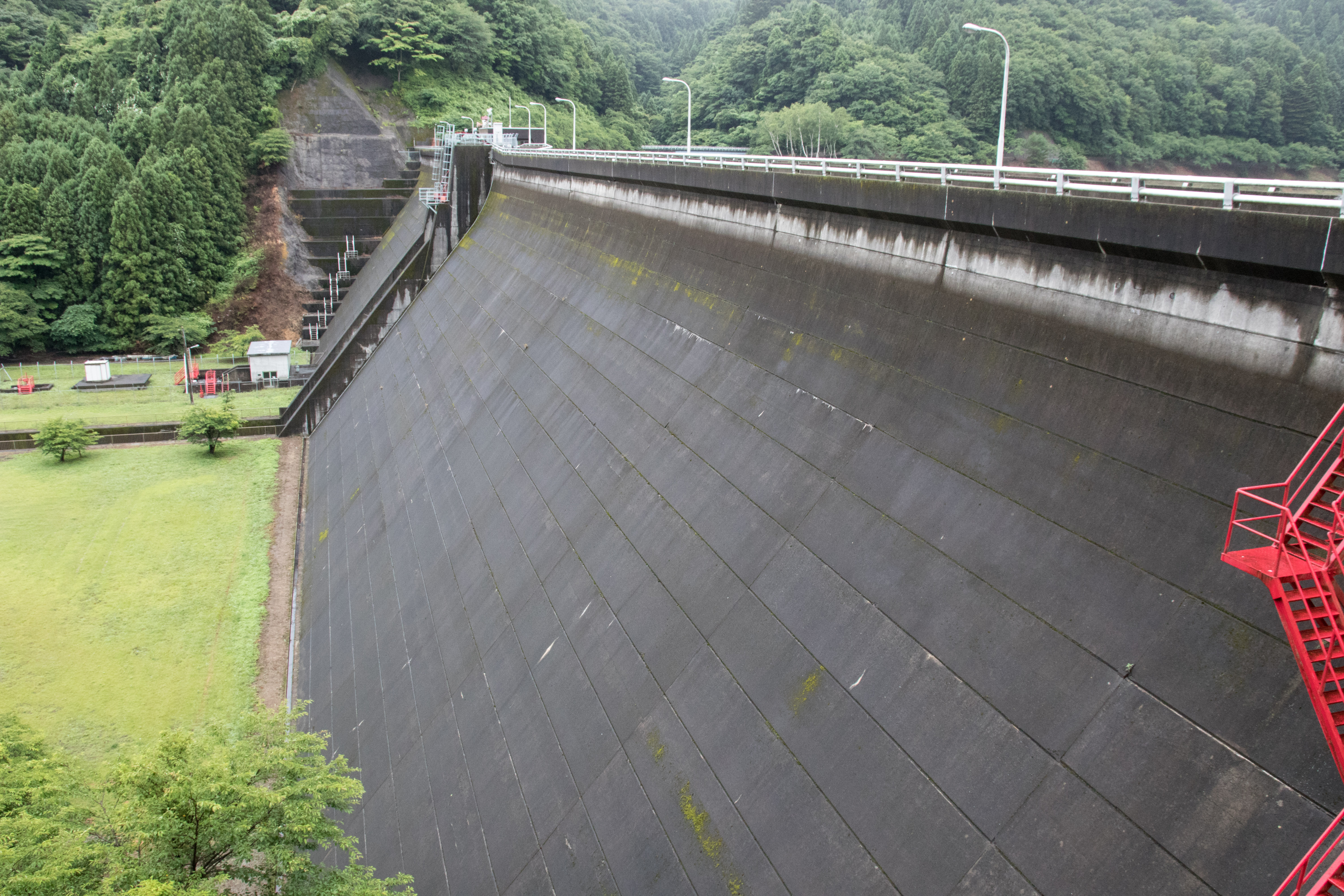

- Location within Japan
- Location: Ōkuma, Fukushima Prefecture
- Coordinates: 37°22′59″N 140°56′39″E
- Opening date: 1973; 53 years ago

Dam and spillways
- Height: 43 m (141 ft)
- Length: 231 m (758 ft)
- Dam volume: 110,000 m^{3} (143,875 cu yd)

Reservoir
- Total capacity: 28,400,000 m^{3} (23,024 acre⋅ft)

Sakashita Dam (坂下ダム, Sakashita-damu) is a dam located in Ōkuma, Fukushima Prefecture, Japan. It was constructed by Hazama Corporation. The dam was completed in 1973. The catchment area for the dam is 12.5km2 There are about 230 people per square kilometer around Sakashita Dam which is quite densely populated, however, the area around the dam is mostly covered in mixed forest.

Collectors cards for the dam are available at the Sakashita Dam Management Office, and Okuma Town Hall main building.

In the aftermath of the Fukushima nuclear disaster, when the Ōkuma township, in which the dam is located, was under a mandatory evacuation order, a group of elderly city employees were based at the Sakashita Dam management office, and took care of the area, including pruning and looking after the cherry trees surrounding the dam.

== Recreational use ==
There is a walking trail around the dam, which links to the trail to Mt Nichiko. Prior to the Fukushima nuclear disaster these trails were popular with walkers, and fishermen could fish in the dam for Herabuna, Carp, Smelt and Mountain Salmon. However, in the aftermath of the nuclear disaster the trails and dam are off limits to recreational users. The exception to this is official walking events during the spring to see cherry blossoms, and the autumn to enjoy the autumn foliage.
