= Tagokura Dam =

Dam in Fukushima Prefecture, Japan

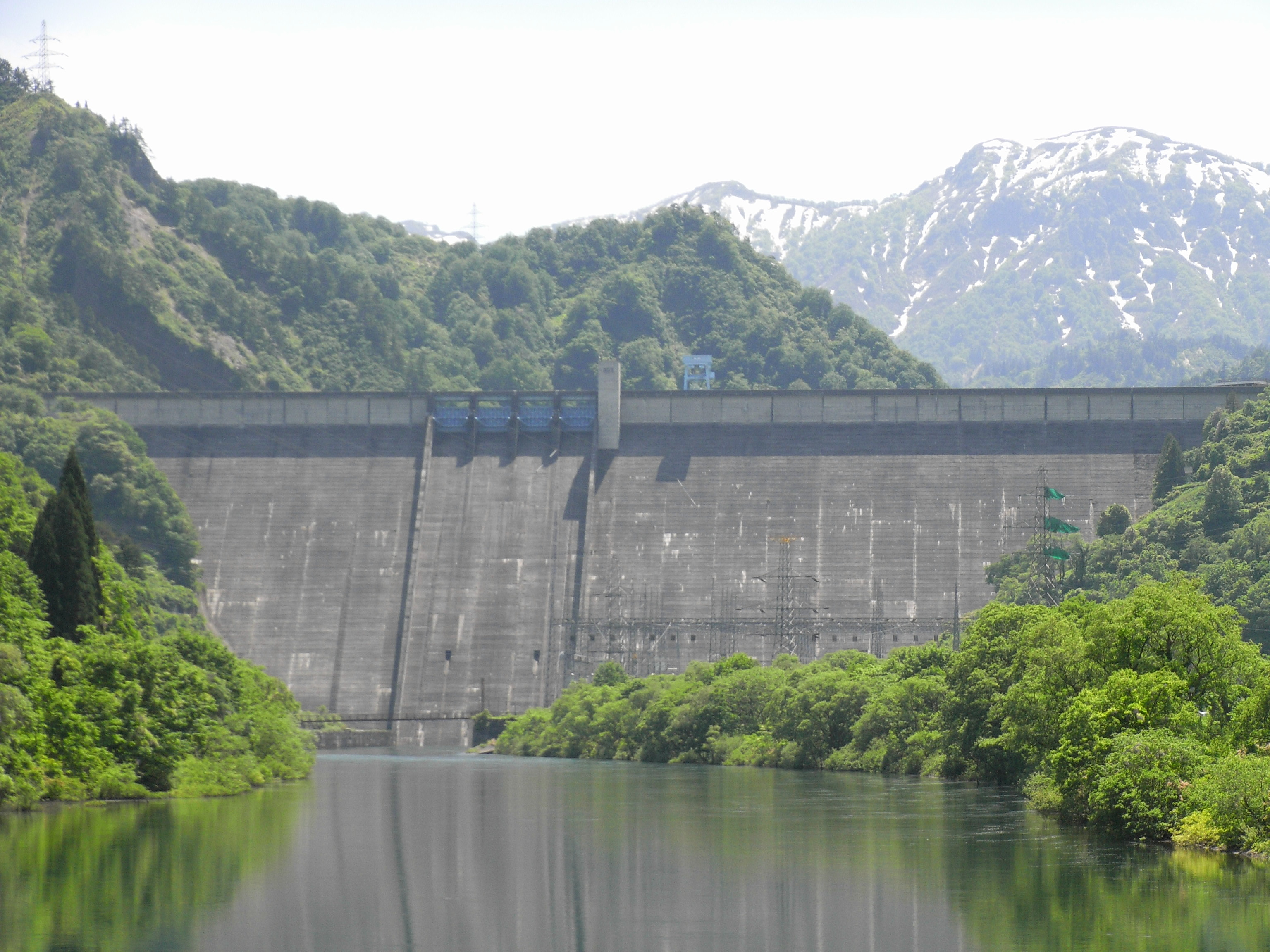
- Interactive map of Tagokura Dam
- Location: Fukushima Prefecture, Japan.
- Coordinates: 37°18′38″N 139°17′13″E
- Construction began: 1953
- Opening date: 1959

Dam and spillways
- Impounds: Tadami River
- Height: 145 metres (476 ft)
- Length: 462 metres (1,516 ft)

Reservoir
- Total capacity: 494,000,000 cubic metres (1.74×10^{10} cu ft)
- Catchment area: 816.3 square kilometres (315.2 sq mi)
- Surface area: 995 hectares (2,460 acres)

Tagokura Dam (田子倉ダム) is a gravity dam, on the Tadami River in the Fukushima Prefecture of Japan. It is owned and operated by the Electric Power Development Company (J-Power). The lake which it impounds is known as Lake Tagokura.

== Statistics ==
The dam is 462 metres (1,516 ft) long and 145 metres (476 ft) high. It supplies a 380 MW hydroelectric power station that is also owned by J-Power.Lake Tagokura has a surface area of 995 hectares (2,460 acres) and a capacity of 494,000,000 cubic metres (1.74×10^{10} cu ft). The catchment area is 816.3 square kilometres (315.2 sq mi).

== History ==
Construction of the dam started in 1953 and it was completed in 1959. In order to facilitate the movement of construction material, the existing railway from Aizu-Wakamatsu to Aizu-Miyashita was extended to Aizu-Kawaguchi, and a light railway was built from there to the construction site. After the dam was completed, the light railway was upgraded and extended to link to an existing line at Oshirakawa, thus creating today's Tadami Line.

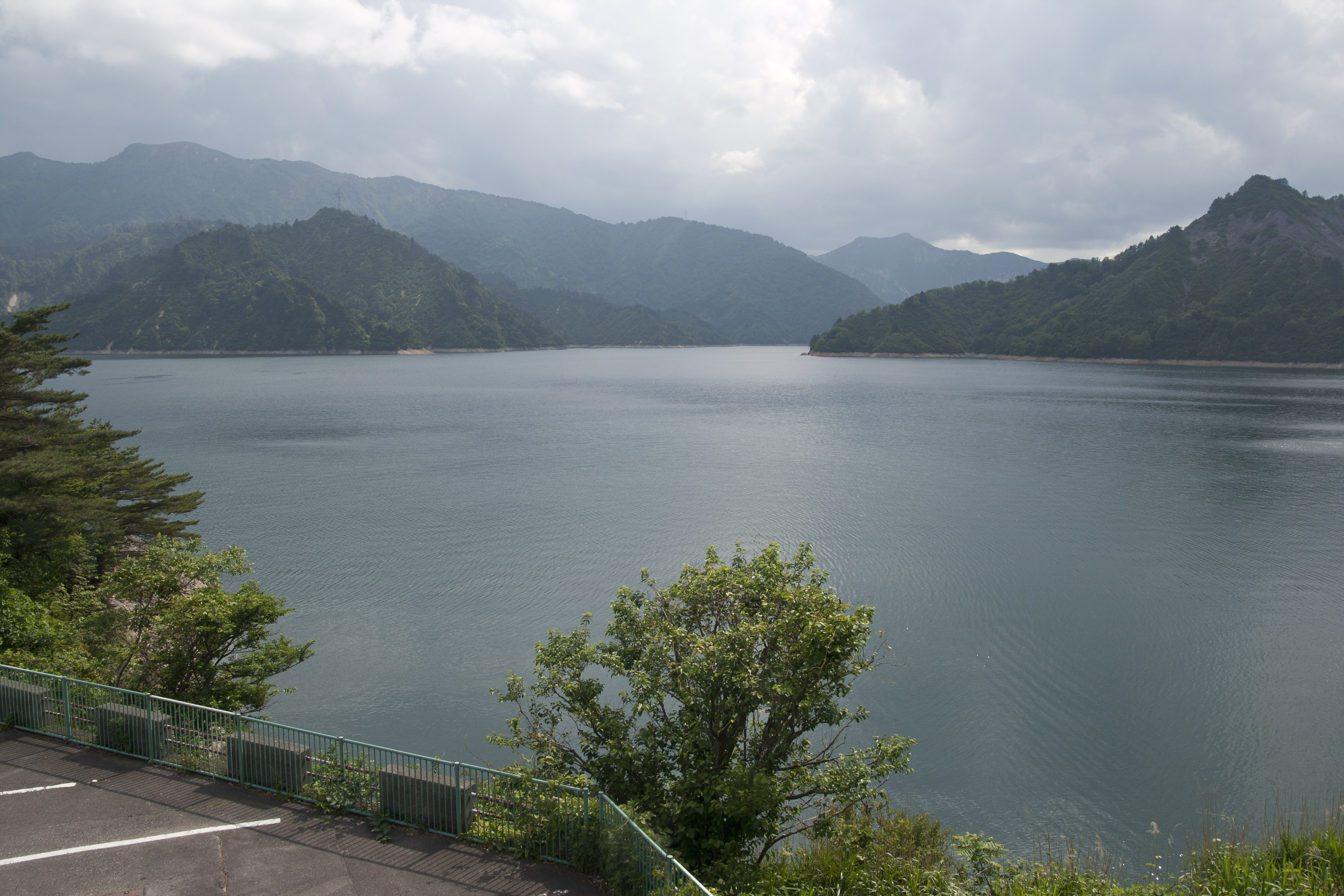
The lake upstream of the dam

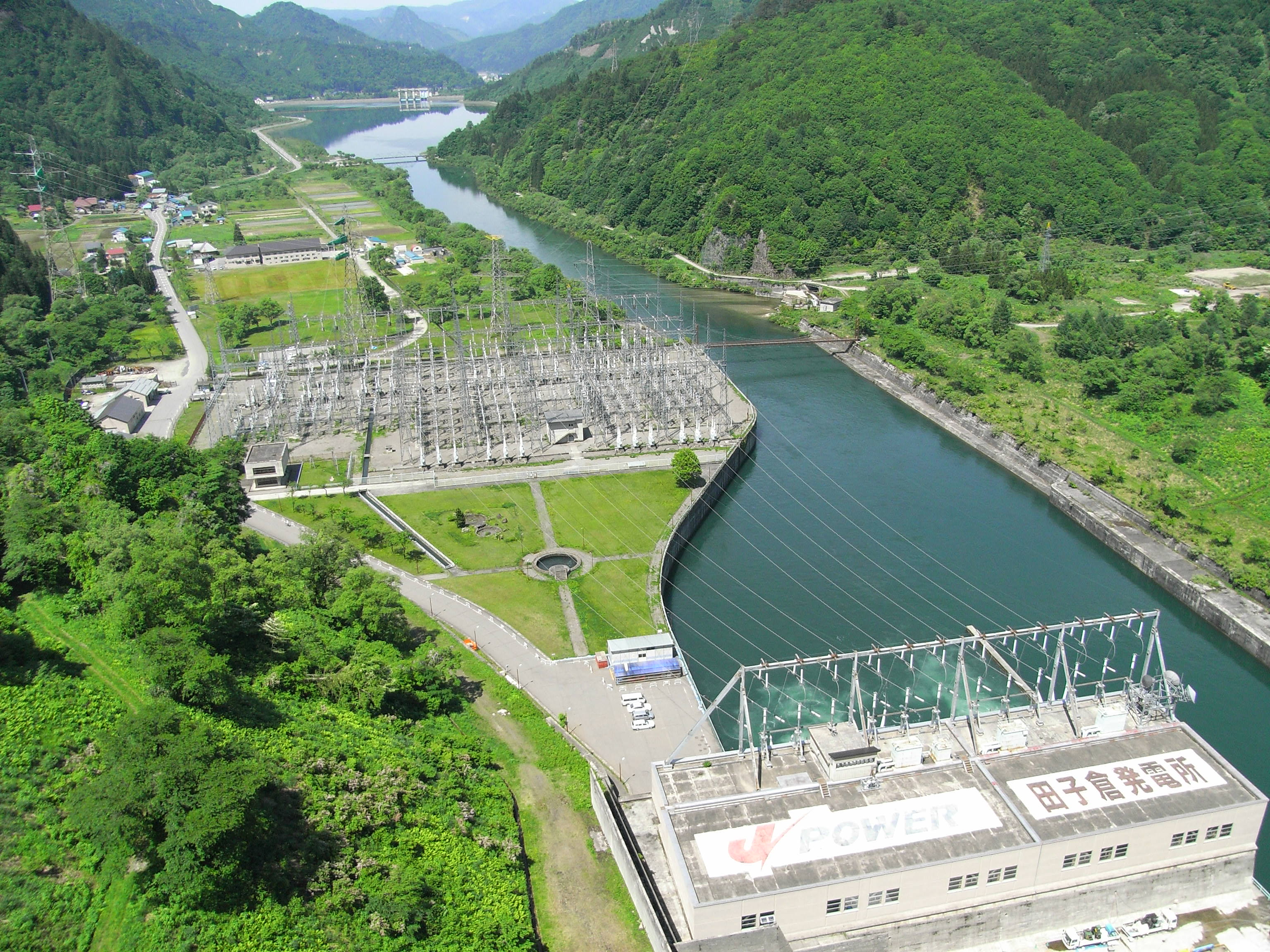
The powerplant downstream of the dam

== See also ==
- Otori Dam – located upstream
- Tadami Dam – located downstream
