= Miyagawa Dam =

Miyagawa Dam may refer to:

- Miyagawa Dam (Fukushima)
- Miyagawa Dam (Mie)
