= Miyashita Dam =

Dam in Fukushima Prefecture, Japan

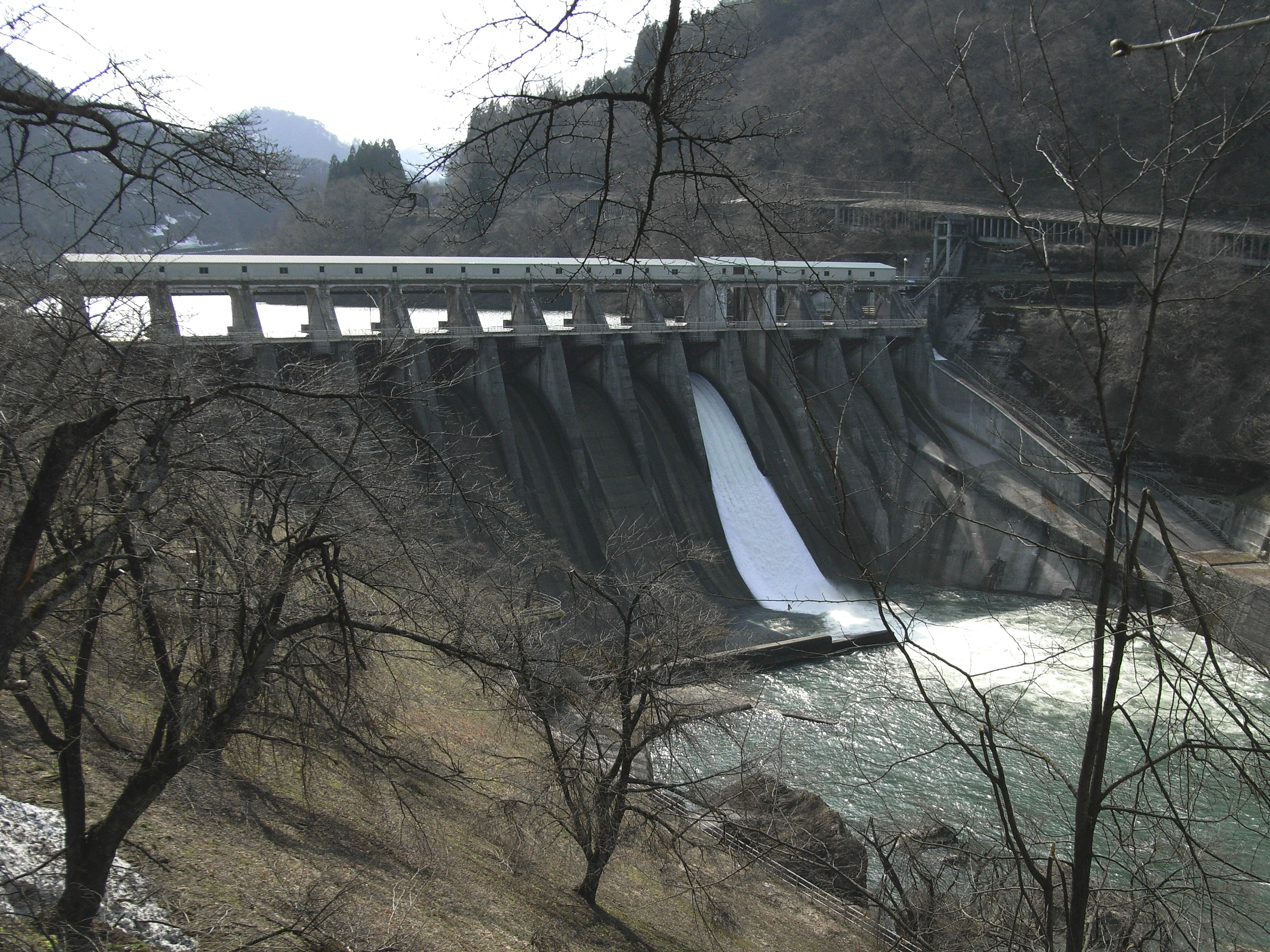

- Location within Japan
- Country: Japan
- Location: Mishima
- Coordinates: 37°27′46″N 139°37′45″E
- Construction began: 1941
- Opening date: 1946
- Owner: Tohoku Electric Power

Dam and spillways
- Impounds: Tadami River
- Height: 53 m (174 ft)
- Length: 168 m (551 ft)
- Dam volume: 152,000 m^{3} (198,808 cu yd)
- Spillway type: Tainter gates

Reservoir
- Total capacity: 20,500,000 m^{3} (16,620 acre⋅ft)
- Active capacity: 4,056,000 m^{3} (3,288 acre⋅ft)
- Catchment area: 2,467 km^{2} (953 sq mi)

Power Station
- Commission date: December 1946
- Hydraulic head: 34.75 m (114 ft)
- Turbines: 5 x 18.8 MW Francis-type
- Installed capacity: 94 MW

Miyashita Dam is a gravity dam on the Tadami River 2 km (1 mi) upstream of Mishima in the Fukushima Prefecture of Japan. It was constructed between 1941 and 1946 for the purpose of hydroelectric power generation. It supplies a 94 MW power station with water.

== See also ==
- Yanaizu Dam – located downstream
- Uwada Dam – located upstream
