= Jūrokkyō Dam =

Dam in Fukushima Prefecture, Japan

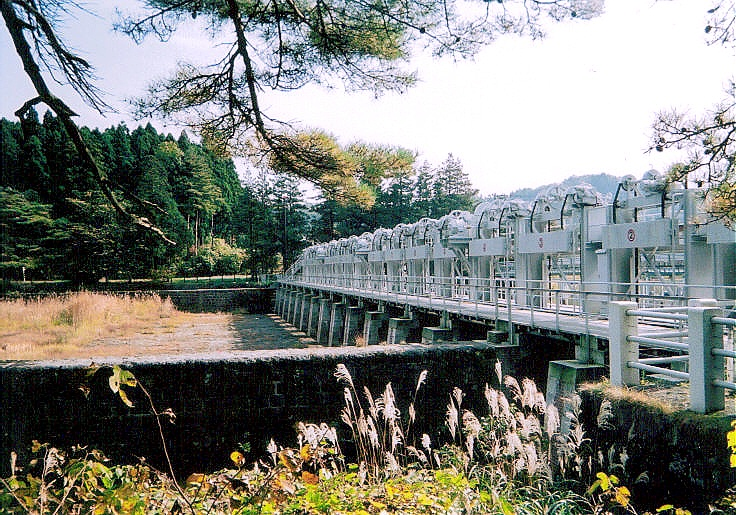
- Interactive map of Jūrokkyō Dam
- Location: Inawashiro, Fukushima, Japan.
- Coordinates: 37°31′18.4″N 140°1′28.0″E

Dam and spillways
- Impounds: Nippashi River

The Jūrokkyō Dam (十六橋水門, Jūrokkyō suimon) is a dam in Inawashiro, Fukushima Prefecture, Japan.
