= Shingo Dam =

Dam in Fukushima Prefecture, Japan

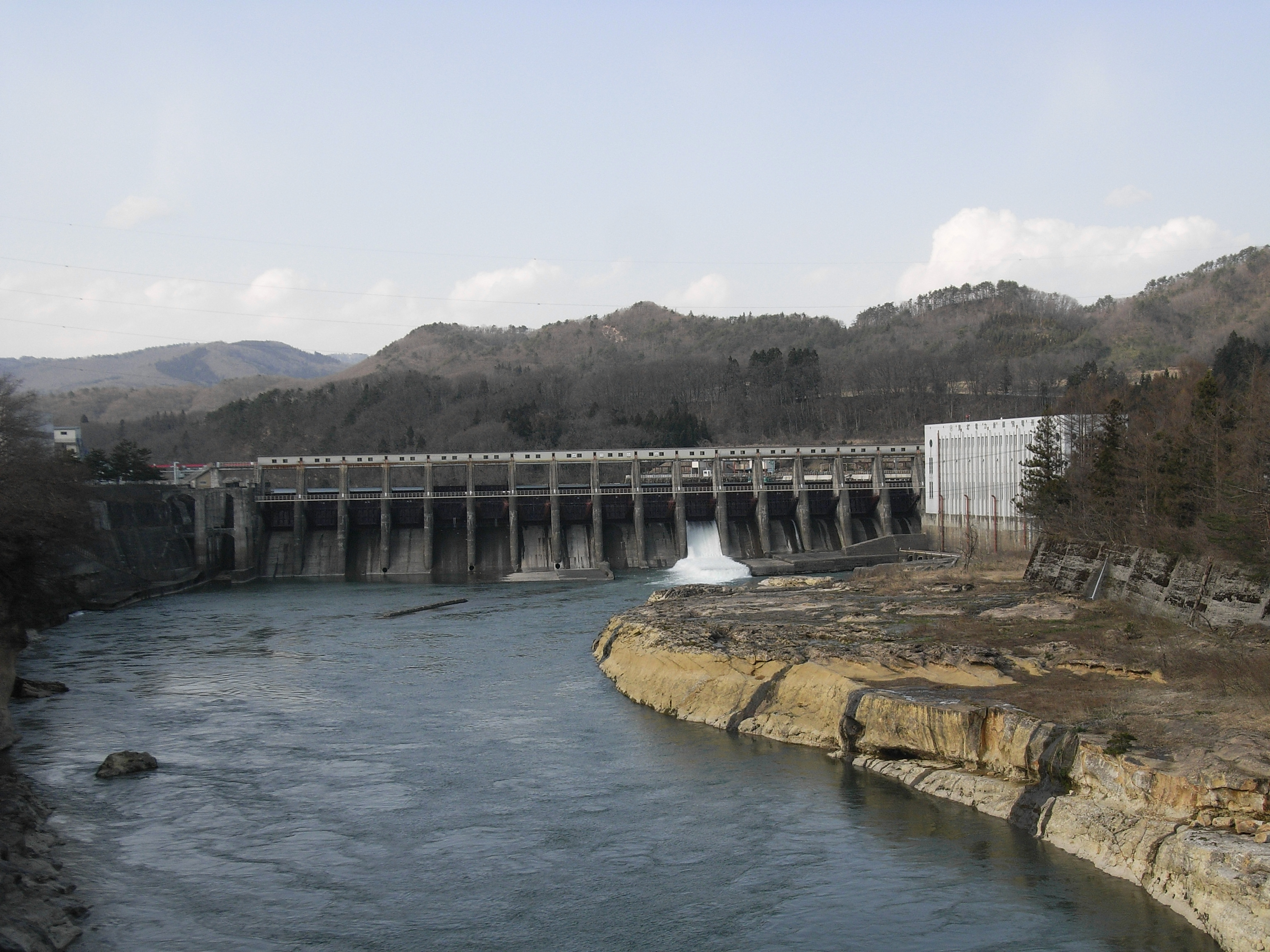
- Location: Fukushima Prefecture, Japan.
- Coordinates: 37°36′41″N 139°44′11″E

Dam and spillways
- Impounds: Agano River

Shingo Dam is a dam in the Fukushima Prefecture of Japan, completed in 1939.
