= Kaminojiri Dam =

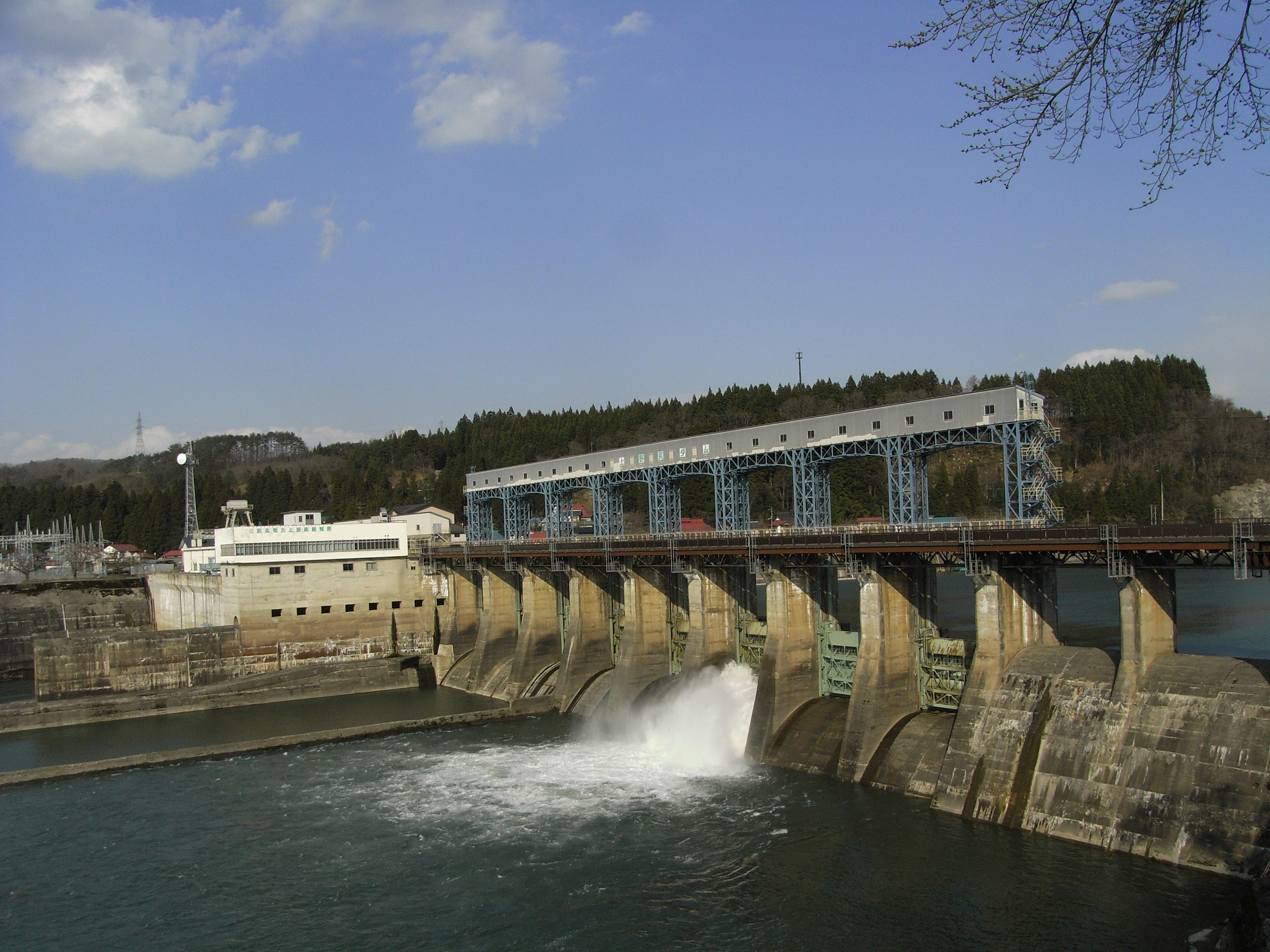
- Location: Nishiaizu, Fukushima, Japan
- Coordinates: 37°37′55″N 139°37′53″E
- Construction began: 1956
- Opening date: 1958

Dam and spillways
- Impounds: Agano River
- Height: 30 m
- Length: 190 m

Reservoir
- Total capacity: 12,370,000 m^{3}
- Catchment area: 5,867 km^{2}
- Surface area: 145 hectares

Kaminojiri Dam (上野尻ダム, Kaminojiri damu) is a dam in Nishiaizu, Fukushima Prefecture, Japan, completed in 1958.
