= Yamasato Dam =

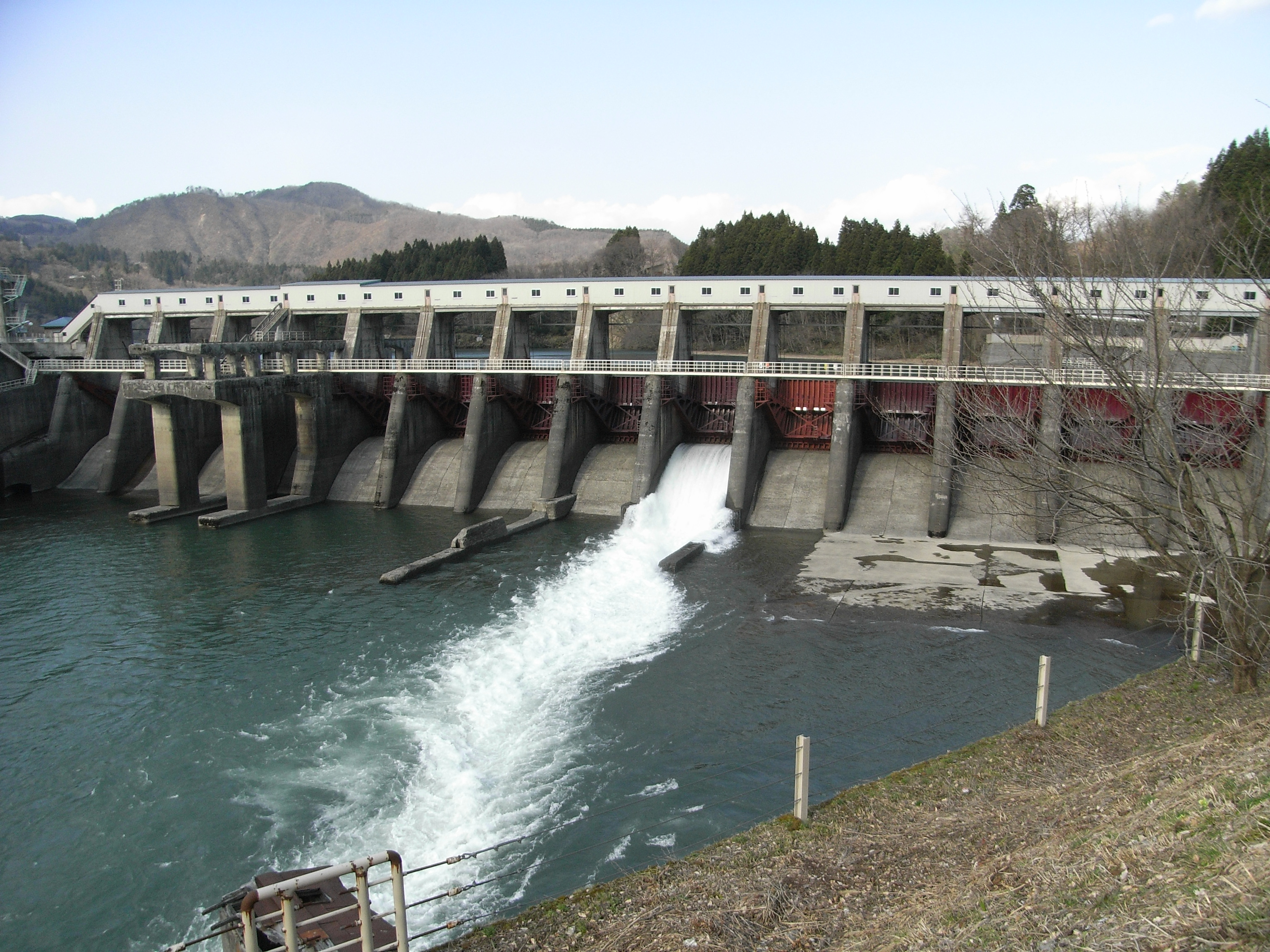
- Location: Fukushima Prefecture, Japan
- Coordinates: 37.60625°N 139.6875°E

Dam and spillways
- Impounds: Agano River

Yamasato Dam is a dam in the Fukushima Prefecture of Japan, completed in 1943.
