= Katakado Dam =

Dam in Fukushima Prefecture, Japan

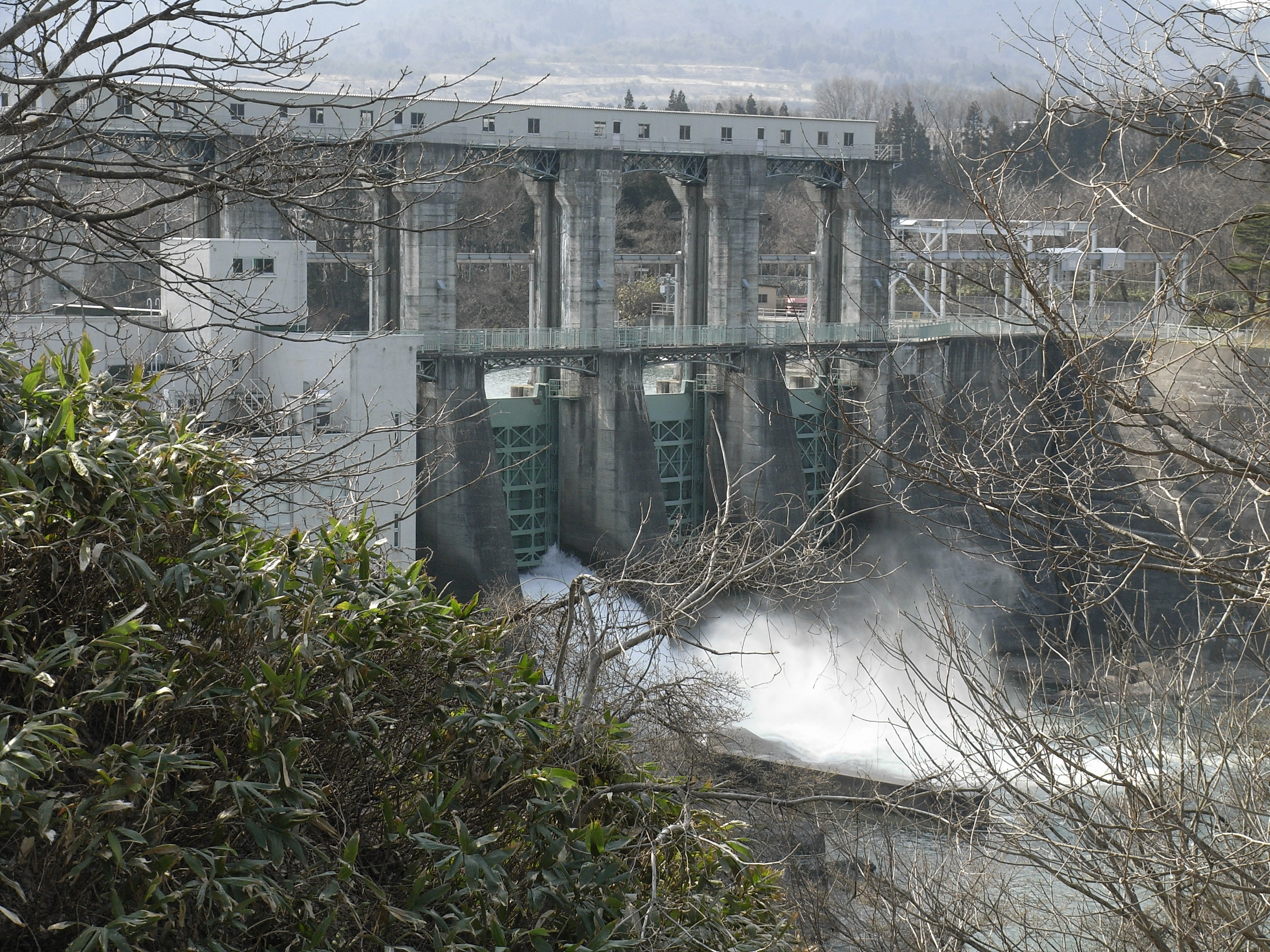

- Location within Japan
- Country: Japan
- Location: Aizubange
- Coordinates: 37°33′52″N 139°45′45″E
- Construction began: 1951
- Opening date: 1953
- Owner: Tohoku Electric Power

Dam and spillways
- Impounds: Tadami River
- Height: 29 m (95 ft)
- Length: 219 m (719 ft)
- Dam volume: 34,000 m^{3} (44,470 cu yd)
- Spillways: 5 x roller gate

Reservoir
- Total capacity: 16,172,000 m^{3} (13,111 acre⋅ft)
- Active capacity: 4,497,000 m^{3} (3,646 acre⋅ft)
- Catchment area: 2,765 km^{2} (1,068 sq mi)

Power Station
- Commission date: 1953
- Hydraulic head: 19.29 m (63 ft)
- Turbines: 3 x 19 MW Kaplan-type
- Installed capacity: 57 MW

Katakado Dam is a gravity dam on the Tadami River 5 km (3 mi) west of Aizubange in the Fukushima Prefecture of Japan. It was constructed between 1951 and 1953 for the purpose of hydroelectric power generation. It supplies a 57 MW power station with water.

== See also ==
- Yanaizu Dam – located upstream
