= Honna Dam =

Dam in Fukushima Prefecture, Japan

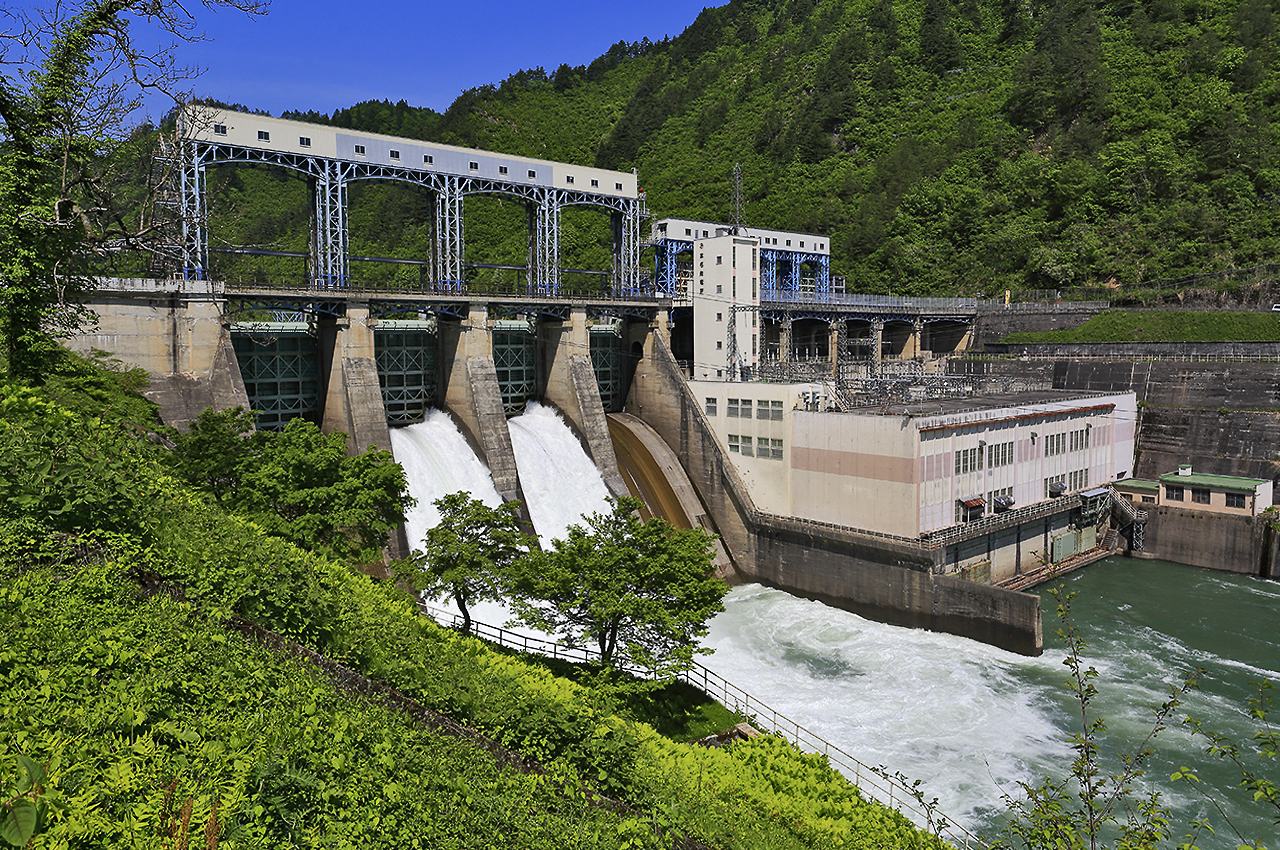

- Location within Japan
- Official name: 本名ダム
- Country: Japan
- Location: Kaneyama
- Coordinates: 37°26′28″N 139°29′35″E
- Construction began: 1952
- Opening date: 1954
- Owner: Tohoku Electric Power

Dam and spillways
- Impounds: Tadami River
- Height: 51.5 m (169 ft)
- Length: 200 m (656 ft)
- Dam volume: 126,000 m^{3} (164,802 cu yd)
- Spillway type: 4 x roller gates

Reservoir
- Total capacity: 25,769,000 m^{3} (20,891 acre⋅ft)
- Active capacity: 13,472,000 m^{3} (10,922 acre⋅ft)
- Catchment area: 2,142 km^{2} (827 sq mi)
- Surface area: 179 km^{2} (69 sq mi)

Power Station
- Commission date: August 1954
- Hydraulic head: 34.9 m (115 ft)
- Turbines: 3 x 26 MW Kaplan-type
- Installed capacity: 78 MW

Honna Dam (本名ダム, Honna damu) is a gravity dam on the Tadami River in Kaneyama, Fukushima Prefecture, Japan. It was constructed between 1952 and 1954 for the purpose of hydroelectric power generation. It supplies a 78 MW power station with water.

== See also ==
- Uwada Dam – located downstream
- Taki Dam – located upstream
