= Yanaizu Dam =

Dam in Fukushima Prefecture, Japan

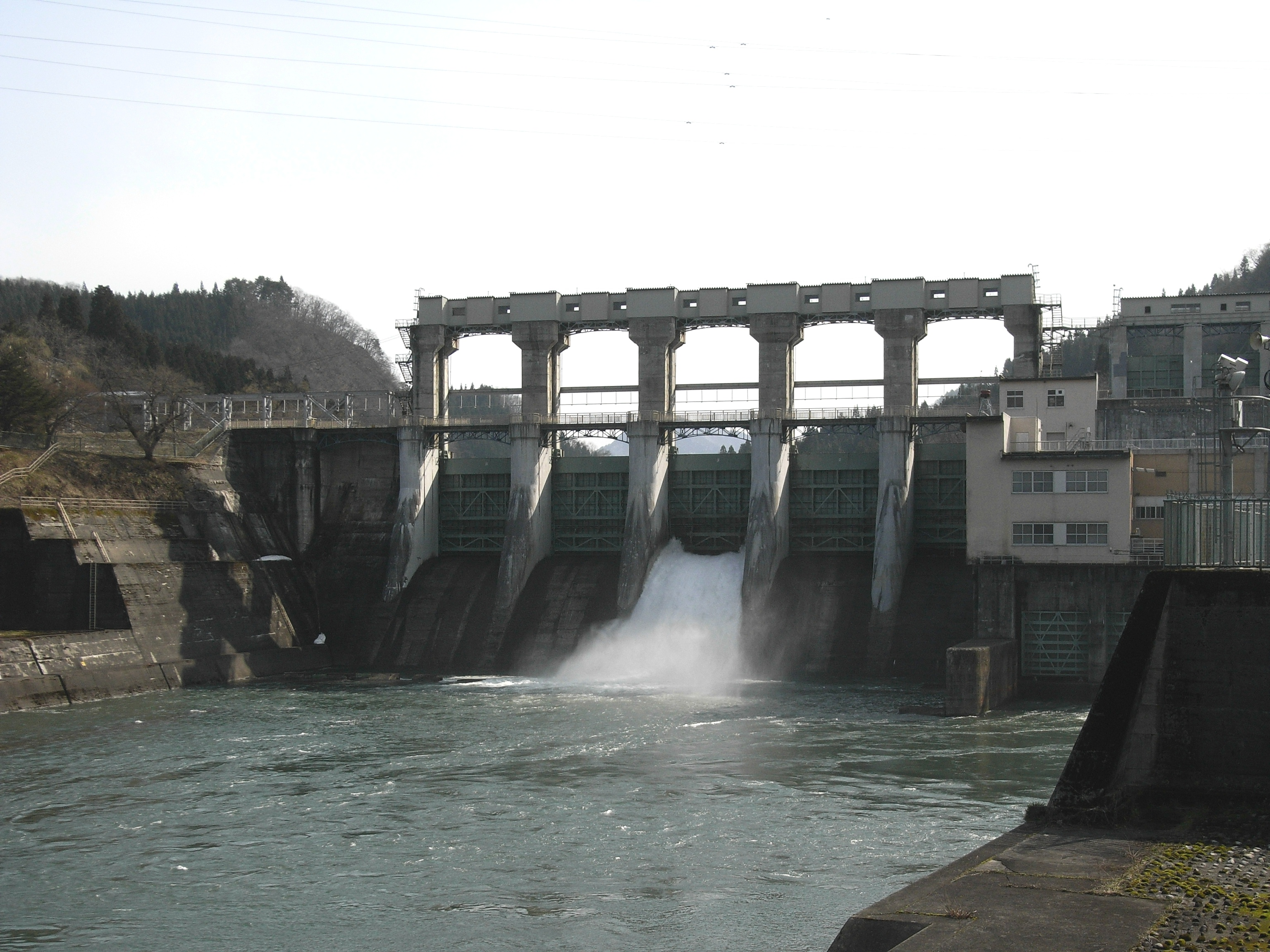

- Location within Japan
- Country: Japan
- Location: Yanaizu
- Coordinates: 37°31′08″N 139°42′24″E
- Construction began: 1952
- Opening date: 1953
- Owner: Tohoku Electric Power

Dam and spillways
- Impounds: Tadami River
- Height: 34 m (112 ft)
- Length: 216 m (709 ft)
- Dam volume: 34,000 m^{3} (44,470 cu yd)
- Spillway type: 5 x roller gate

Reservoir
- Total capacity: 23,938,000 m^{3} (19,407 acre⋅ft)
- Active capacity: 5,801,000 m^{3} (4,703 acre⋅ft)
- Catchment area: 2,700 km^{2} (1,042 sq mi)
- Surface area: 2 km^{2} (1 sq mi)

Power Station
- Commission date: August 1953
- Hydraulic head: 25 m (82 ft)
- Turbines: 3 x 25 MW Kaplan-type
- Installed capacity: 75 MW

Yanaizu Dam is a gravity dam on the Tadami River 2 km (1 mi) upstream of Yanaizu in the Fukushima Prefecture of Japan. It was constructed between December 1952 and August 1953 for the purpose of hydroelectric power generation. It supplies a 75 MW power station with water.

== See also ==
- Katakado Dam – located downstream
- Miyashita Dam – located upstream
