= Shinmiyagawa Dam =

Dam in Fukushima Prefecture, Japan

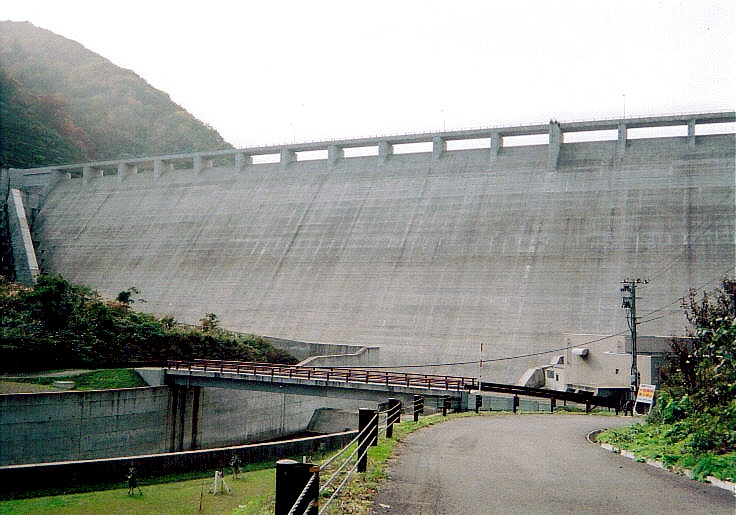
- Interactive map of Shinmiyagawa Dam
- Location: Fukushima Prefecture, Japan.

Dam and spillways
- Impounds: Agano River

Shinmiyagawa Dam is a dam in the Fukushima Prefecture of Japan, completed in 2004.
