= Uwada Dam =

Dam in Fukushima Prefecture, Japan

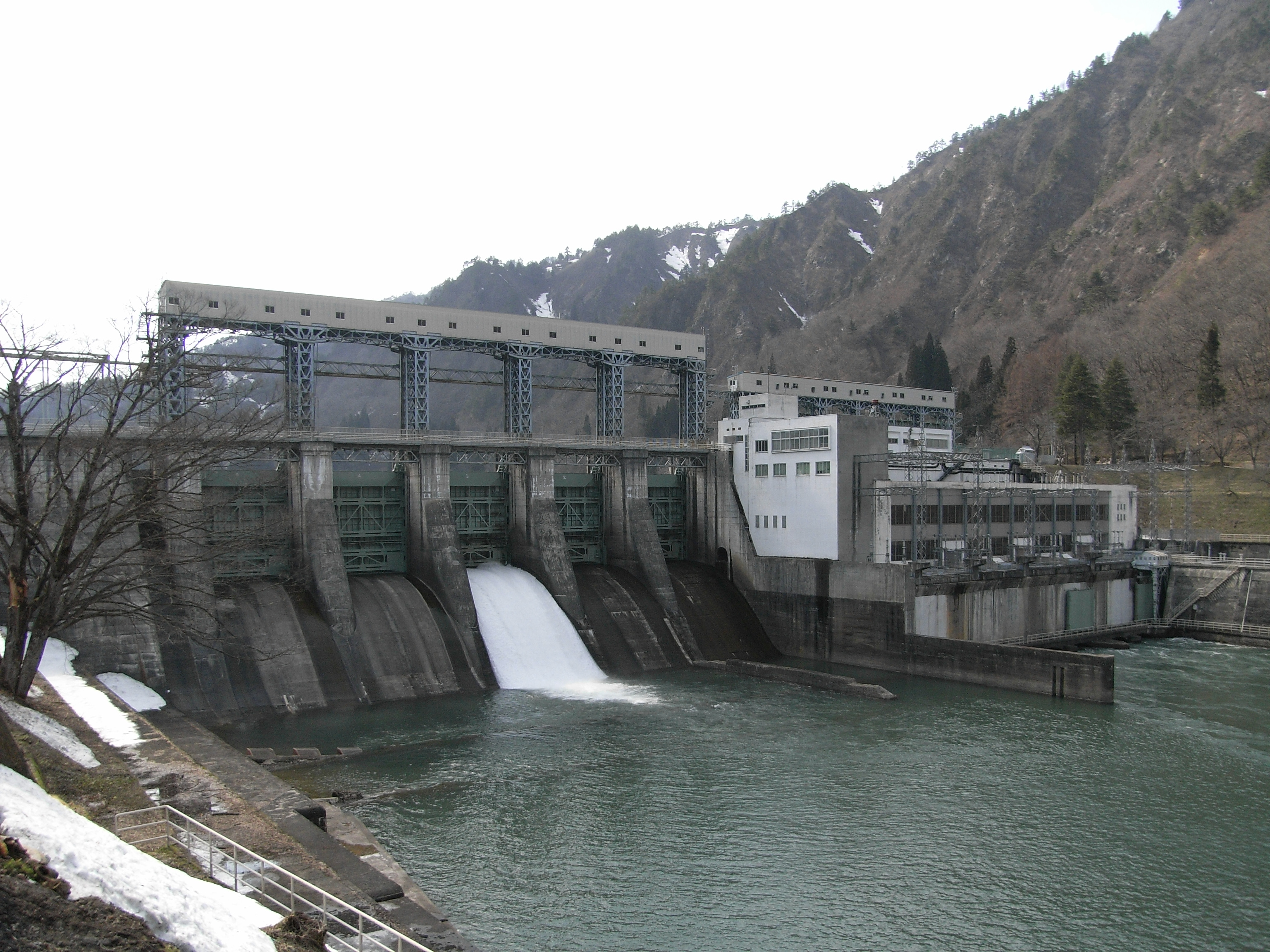

- Location within Japan
- Country: Japan
- Location: Kaneyama
- Coordinates: 37°28′59″N 139°32′14″E
- Construction began: 1952
- Opening date: 1954
- Owner: Tohoku Electric Power

Dam and spillways
- Impounds: Tadami River
- Height: 34 m (112 ft)
- Length: 283 m (928 ft)
- Dam volume: 23,000 m^{3} (30,083 cu yd)
- Spillway type: 5 x roller gates

Reservoir
- Total capacity: 20,500,000 m^{3} (16,620 acre⋅ft)
- Active capacity: 4,426,000 m^{3} (3,588 acre⋅ft)
- Catchment area: 2,402 km^{2} (927 sq mi)
- Surface area: 1.52 km^{2} (376 acres)

Power Station
- Commission date: March 1954
- Hydraulic head: 26.3 m (86 ft)
- Turbines: 3 x 21.3 MW Kaplan-type
- Installed capacity: 63.9 MW

Uwada Dam is a gravity dam on the Tadami River 500 m (1,640 ft) downstream of Kaneyama in the Fukushima Prefecture of Japan. It was constructed between 1952 and 1954 for the purpose of hydroelectric power generation. It supplies a 63.9 MW power station with water.

== See also ==
- Miyashita Dam – located downstream
- Honna Dam – located upstream
