= Okawa Dam (Fukushima) =

Dam in Fukushima Prefecture, Japan

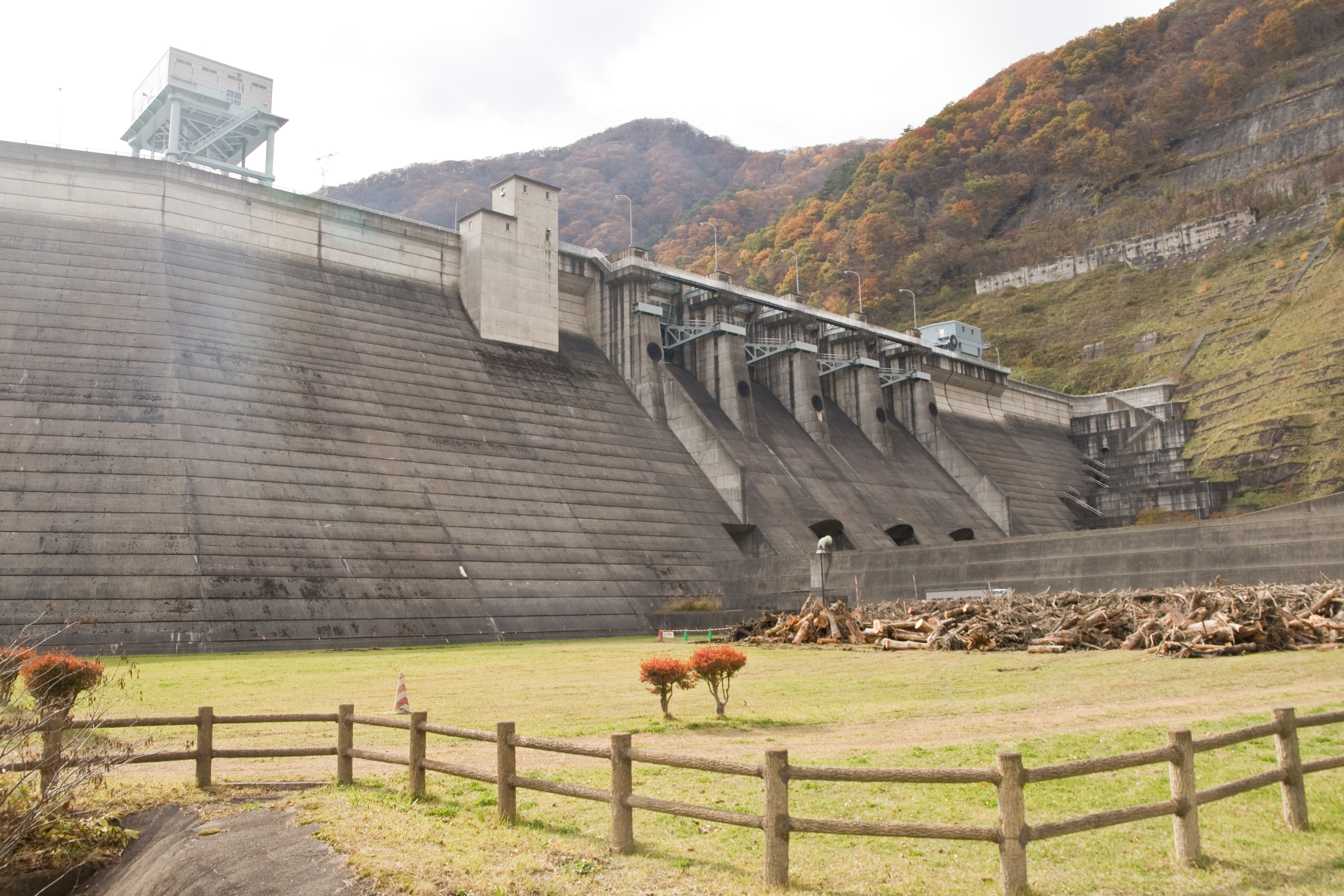
- View of Okawa Dam
- Interactive map of Okawa Dam
- Location: Aizuwakamatsu and Shimogō, Fukushima Prefecture, Japan
- Coordinates: 37°20′50″N 139°54′38″E
- Status: Operational
- Construction began: 1971
- Opening date: October 20, 1987
- Operator: Ministry of Land, Infrastructure, Transport and Tourism (Hokuriku Regional Development Bureau)

Dam and spillways
- Impounds: Agano River
- Height: 75.0 m
- Length: 406.5 m
- Dam volume: 1,000,000 m³

Reservoir
- Creates: Lake Wakasato
- Total capacity: 57,500,000 m³
- Active capacity: 44,500,000 m³
- Catchment area: 825.6 km²
- Surface area: 190.0 ha

Okawa Dam (大川ダム, Ōkawa damu) is a combined dam located on the border of Aizuwakamatsu City and Shimogō Town in Fukushima Prefecture, Japan. It was constructed on the upper reaches of the Agano River. The dam lake is named Lake Wakasato (若郷湖, Wakasato-ko).

== Purpose ==
Okawa Dam is a specific multi-purpose dam built under the Specific Multi-purpose Dam Act of Japan. It is constructed and managed by the Ministry of Land, Infrastructure, Transport and Tourism. It serves multiple purposes. These include:

- Flood control
- Maintenance of normal river function
- Irrigation water supply
- Domestic water supply
- Industrial water supply
- Hydroelectric power generation

== Specifications ==
The dam is a combined type structure. It uses both gravity concrete and rock-fill dam construction methods. The structure stands 75.0 meters high. Its crest length is 406.5 meters. The total volume of the dam is 1,000,000 cubic meters. The reservoir is called Lake Wakasato. It has a total capacity of 57,500,000 cubic meters. The active capacity is 44,500,000 cubic meters. The water surface covers an area of 190.0 hectares.

The dam features 11 spillway gates. It employs the RCD (Roller Compacted Dam-concrete) method. This method was first used in Japan for this specific project. The choice was made due to unfavorable geological conditions at the dam site.

== History ==
Construction of Okawa Dam began in 1971. This project was part of the comprehensive Agano River development plan. The placement of body concrete started on July 5, 1979. This work finished on November 24, 1983. Test impoundment began on November 19, 1985. The dam was officially completed on October 20, 1987. The entire construction process took 16 years. Full operation and management commenced in 1988. This followed the development of the surrounding area.

The main construction contractors were Kajima Corporation and Obayashi Corporation.

== Power generation ==
The dam supports two hydroelectric power stations:

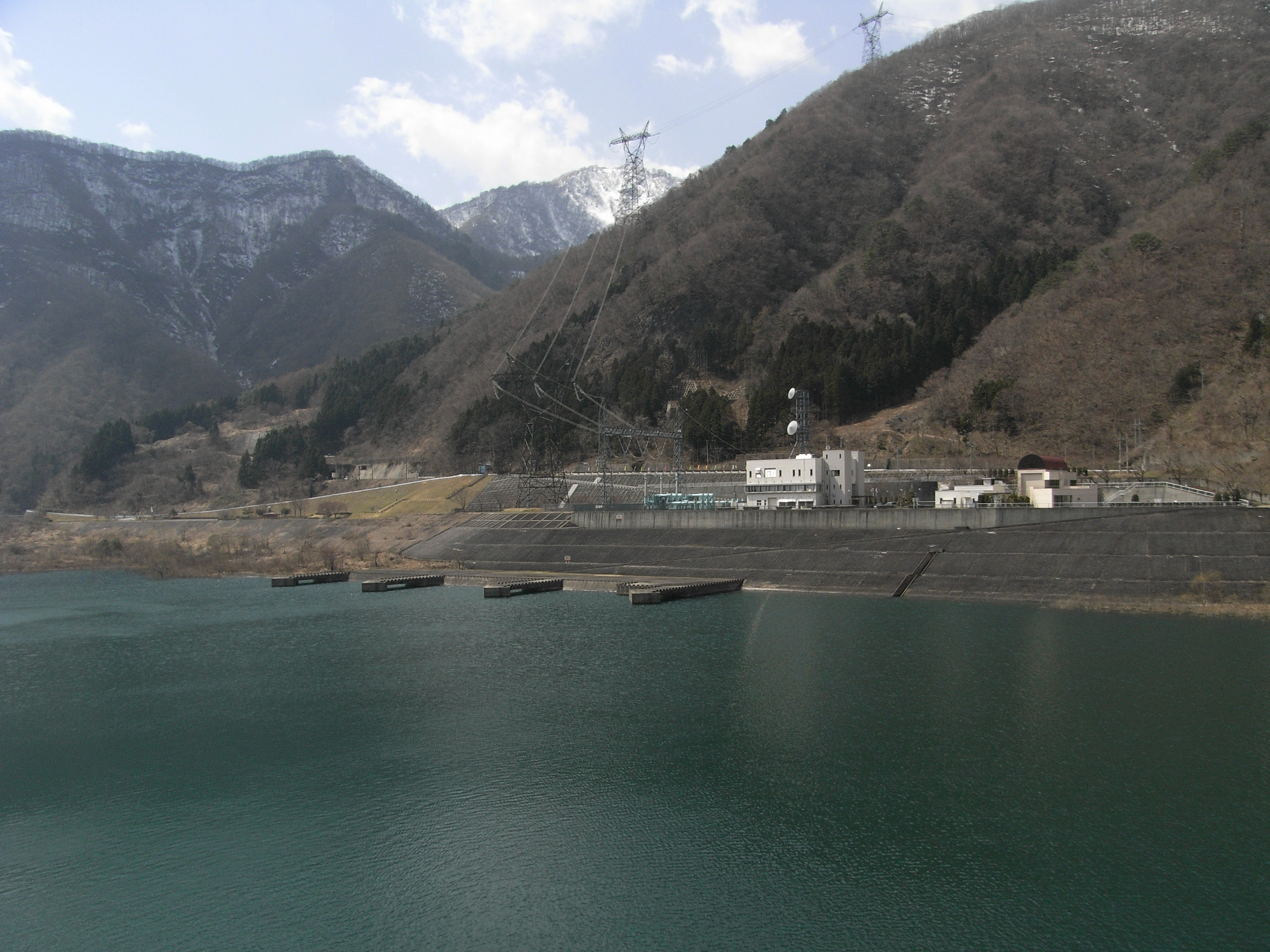
Shimogo Power Station (left bank)

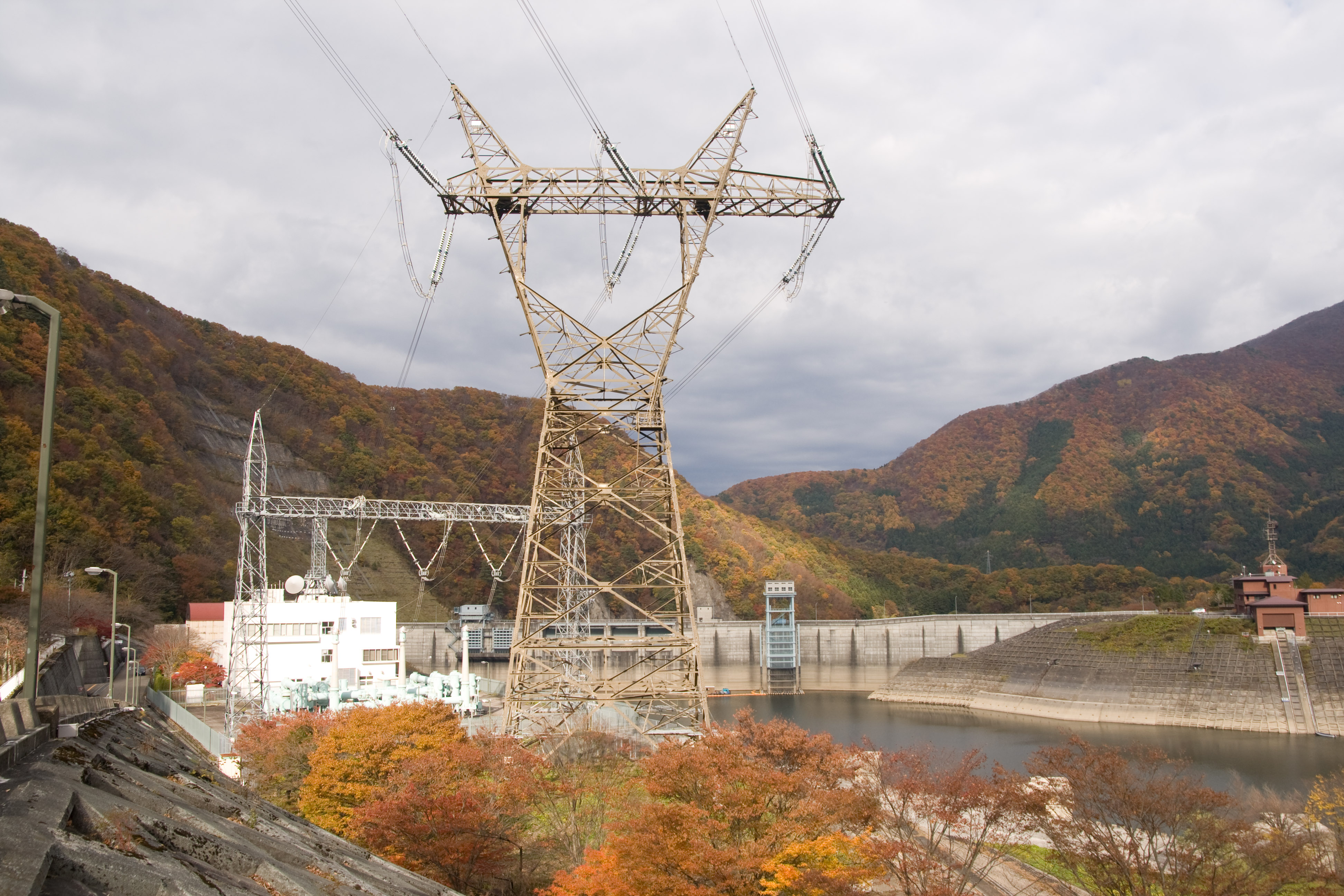
Shimogo power line and Okawa Dam

- Shimogo Power Station (下郷発電所): It is operated by J-POWER (Electric Power Development Co., Ltd.). The installed capacity is 1,000,000 kW. This is a pumped-storage power station. It uses Lake Wakasato as the lower reservoir. It uses Ōuchi Dam on the Ono River as the upper reservoir. The facility utilizes a head difference of approximately 400 meters.
- Okawa Power Station (大川発電所): It is operated by Tohoku Electric Power. The installed capacity is 21,000 kW.

== Lake Wakasato ==
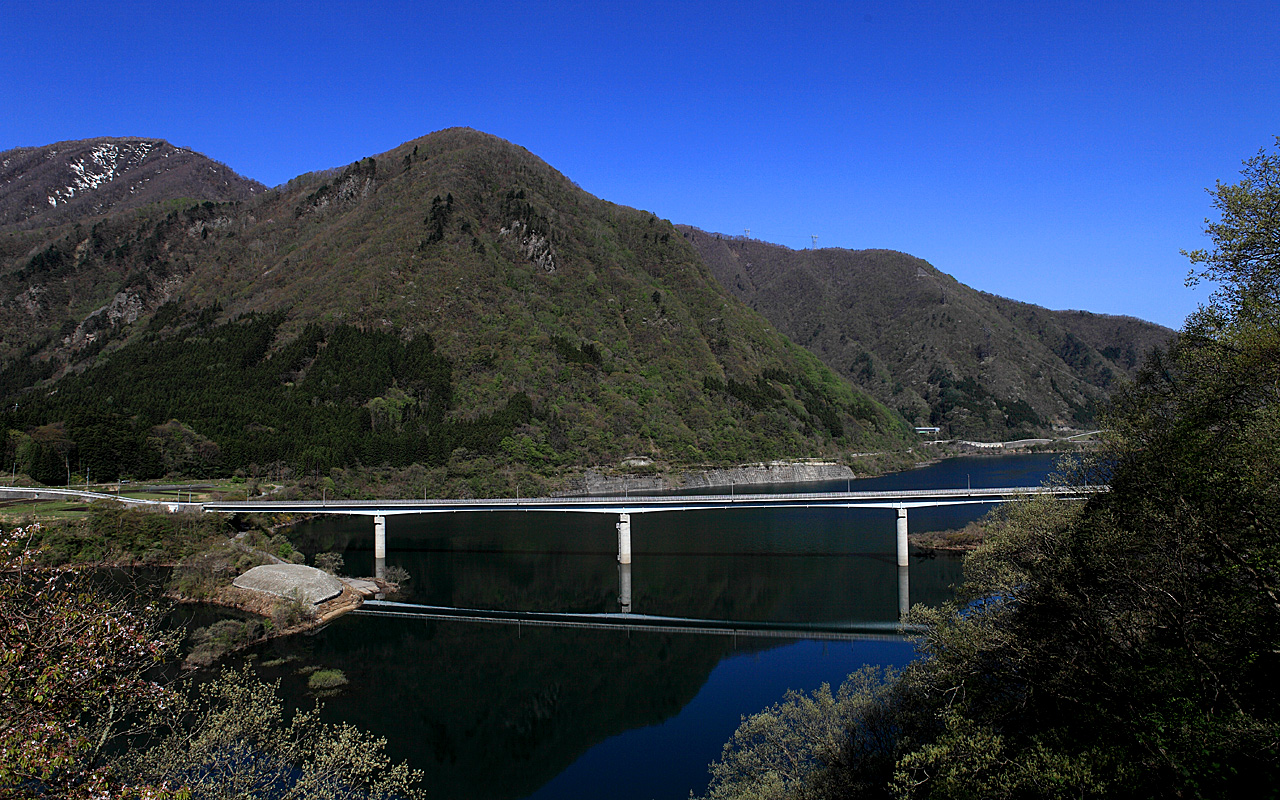
Okawa Lake Surface Bridge

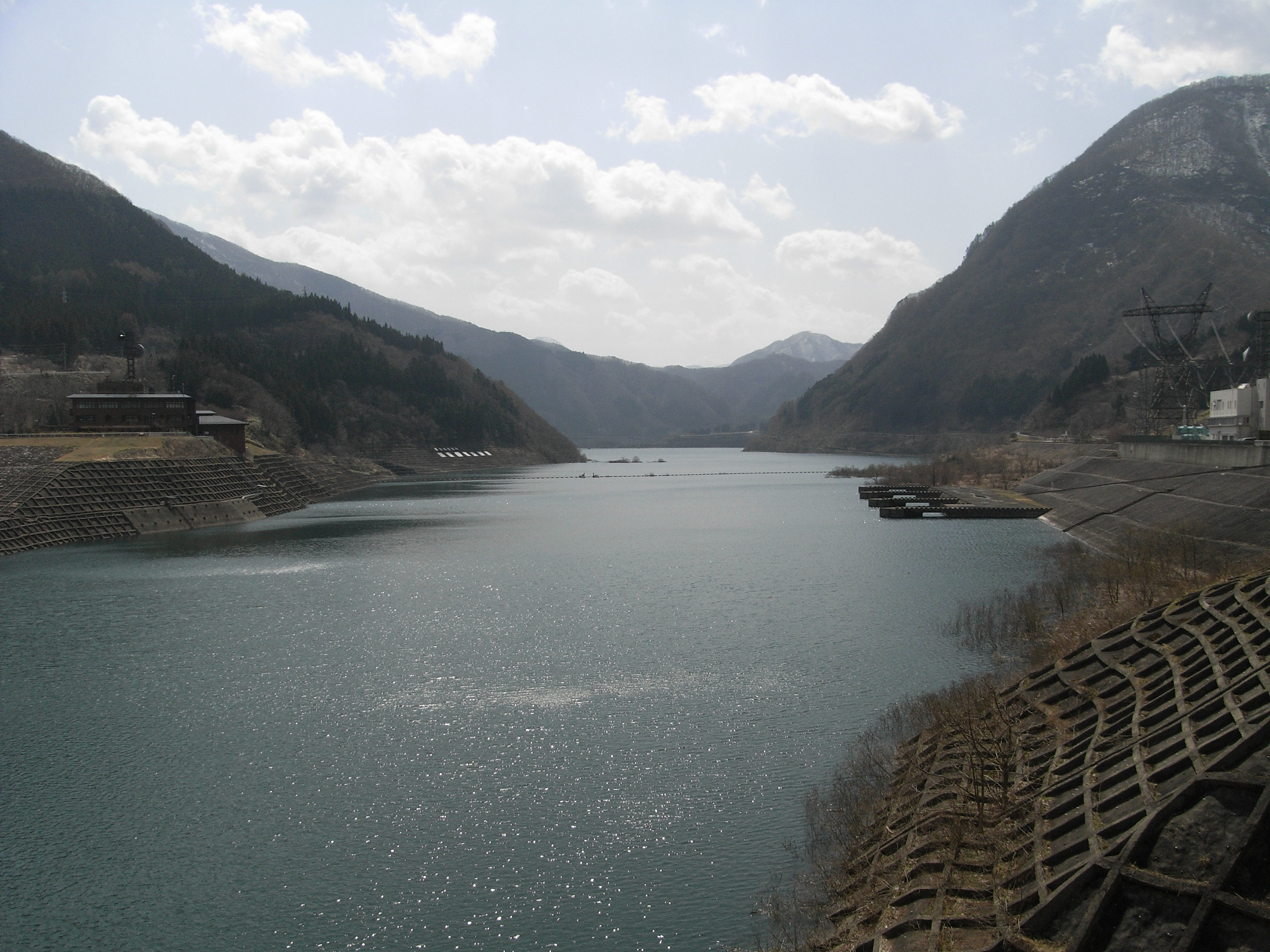
Okawa Dam and Lake Wakasato

The reservoir created by the dam is called Lake Wakasato (若郷湖). The name combines two characters. The character "若" (waka) comes from Aizuwakamatsu City. The character "郷" (sato) comes from Shimogō Town. Both banks of the lake are developed as parks. These include the West Park on the Shimogō Town side and the East Park on the Aizuwakamatsu City side. The parks feature recreational facilities and walking trails. A full circuit on these trails takes approximately 2 hours. The area is particularly beautiful during spring greenery and autumn foliage seasons.

== Access ==
The dam is accessible via the Aizu Railway Aizu Line. The nearest stop is Ōkawa-Dam-Kōen Station. It is about a 15-minute walk from the dam. Travel by car takes approximately 40 minutes. The route starts from the Aizuwakamatsu Interchange on the Ban'etsu Expressway.

== See also ==
- List of dams in Japan
- List of power stations in Japan
- Agano River
- Ōuchi Dam
