= Tadami River =

Coordinates: 37°37′25″N 139°45′27″E

Tadami
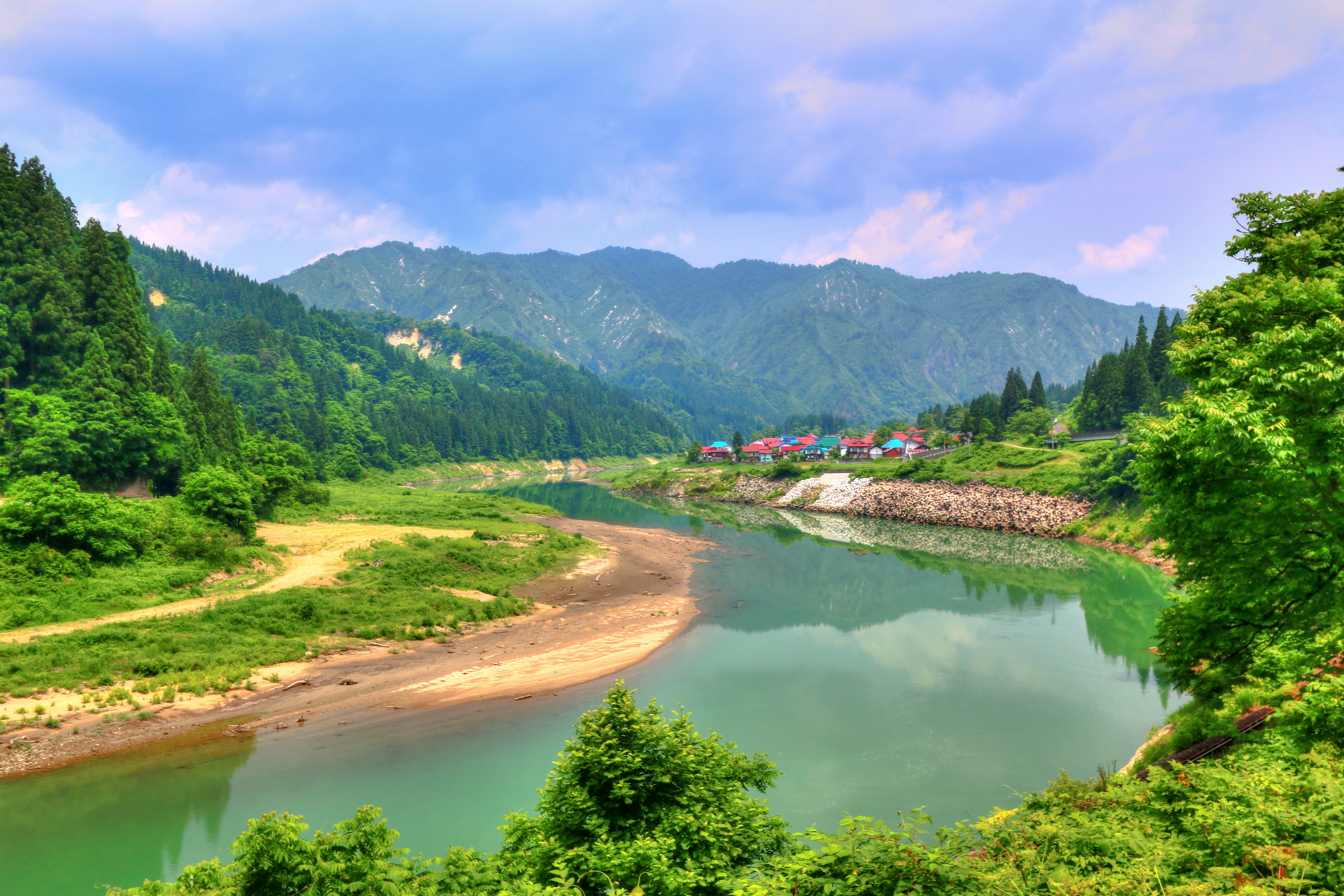
- The river near Kaneyama

Location
- Country: Japan

Physical characteristics
- Mouth
  - location: Agano River
- Length: 145 km (90 mi)
- Basin size: 8,400 km^{2} (3,200 sq mi)

The Tadami River (只見川, Tadami-gawa) is a major tributary of the Agano River in Japan. Its basin covers 8,400 km^{2} (3,243 mi^{2}) and its main stem is extensively regulated and developed for hydroelectric power. The river is located within Niigata, Gunma and Fukushima Prefectures.

== Dams ==
Starting from the furthest upstream, the river is dammed by:

- Okutadami Dam – 157 m (515 ft) tall gravity dam, 560 MW
- Otori Dam – 83 m (272 ft) tall arch-gravity dam, 182 MW
- Tagokura Dam – 145 m (476 ft) tall gravity dam, 380 MW
- Tadami Dam – 29 m (95 ft) tall embankment dam, 65 MW
- Taki Dam – 46 m (151 ft) tall gravity dam, 92 MW
- Honna Dam – 51.5 m (169 ft) tall gravity dam, 78 MW
- Uwada Dam – 34 m (112 ft) tall gravity dam, 63.9 MW
- Miyashita Dam – 53 m (174 ft) tall gravity dam, 94 MW
- Yanaizu Dam – 34 m (112 ft) tall gravity dam, 75 MW
- Katakado Dam – 29 m (95 ft) tall gravity dam, 57 MW
