= Tadami Dam =

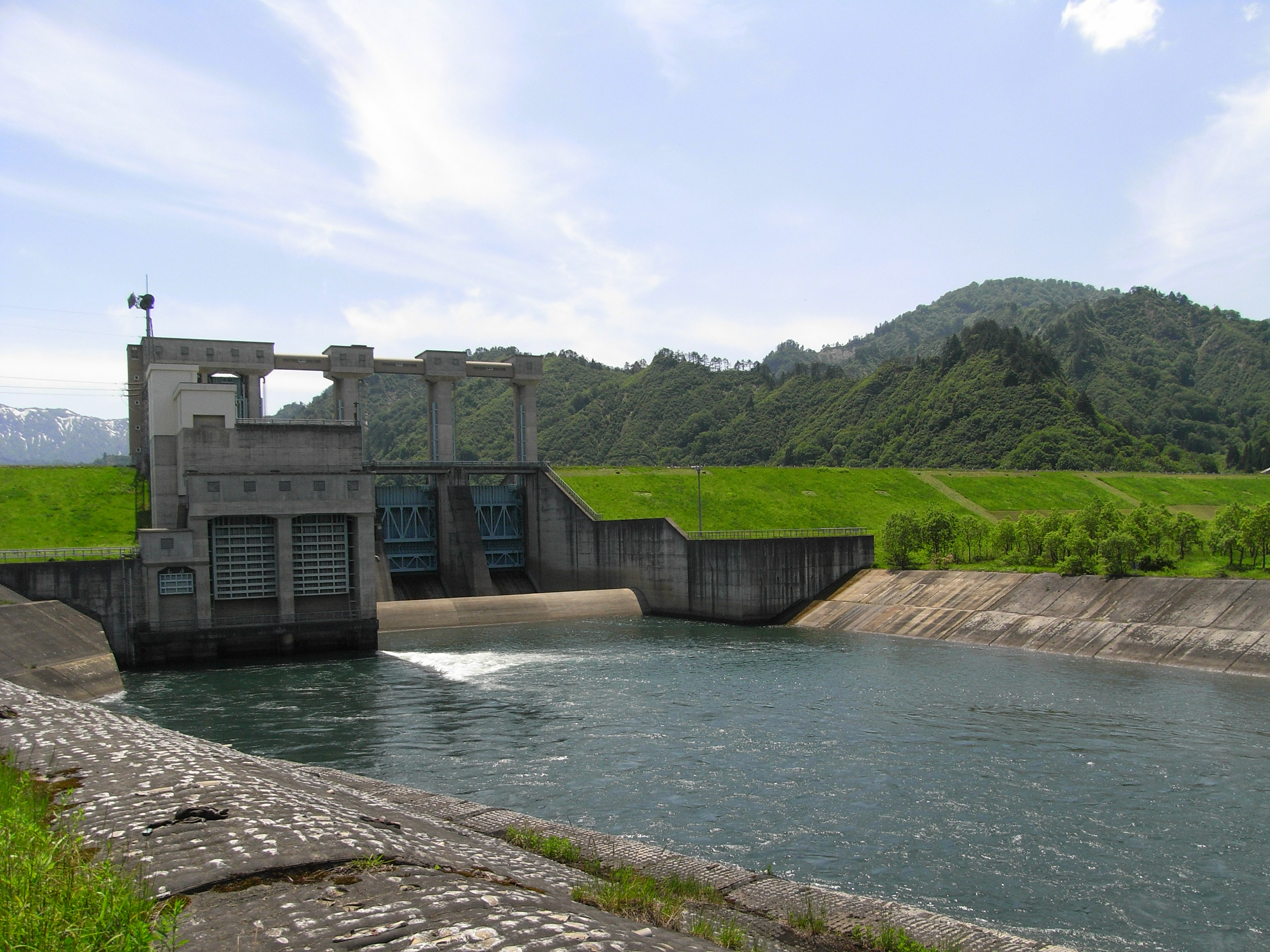

- Location within Japan
- Location: Fukushima Prefecture
- Coordinates: 37°20′08″N 139°18′04″E
- Construction began: 1981
- Opening date: 1989

Dam and spillways
- Impounds: Tadami River
- Height: 29 m (95 ft)
- Length: 582 m (1,909 ft)
- Dam volume: 400,000 m^{3} (523,180 cu yd)

Reservoir
- Total capacity: 45,000,000 m^{3} (36,482 acre⋅ft)
- Active capacity: 20,000,000 m^{3} (16,214 acre⋅ft)
- Catchment area: 856.2 km^{2} (331 sq mi)

Power Station
- Commission date: 28 July 1989
- Hydraulic head: 19.8 m (65 ft)
- Installed capacity: 65 MW

Tadami Dam is a rock-fill embankment dam on the Tadami River near Tadami in Fukushima Prefecture, Japan. It was constructed between 1981 and 1989 for the purposes of hydroelectric power generation and controlling the outflows of the Tagokura Dam. It supports a 65 MW power station.

== See also ==
- Taki Dam – located downstream
- Tagokura Dam – located upstream
