= Ouchi Dam =

Dam in Fukushima Prefecture, Japan

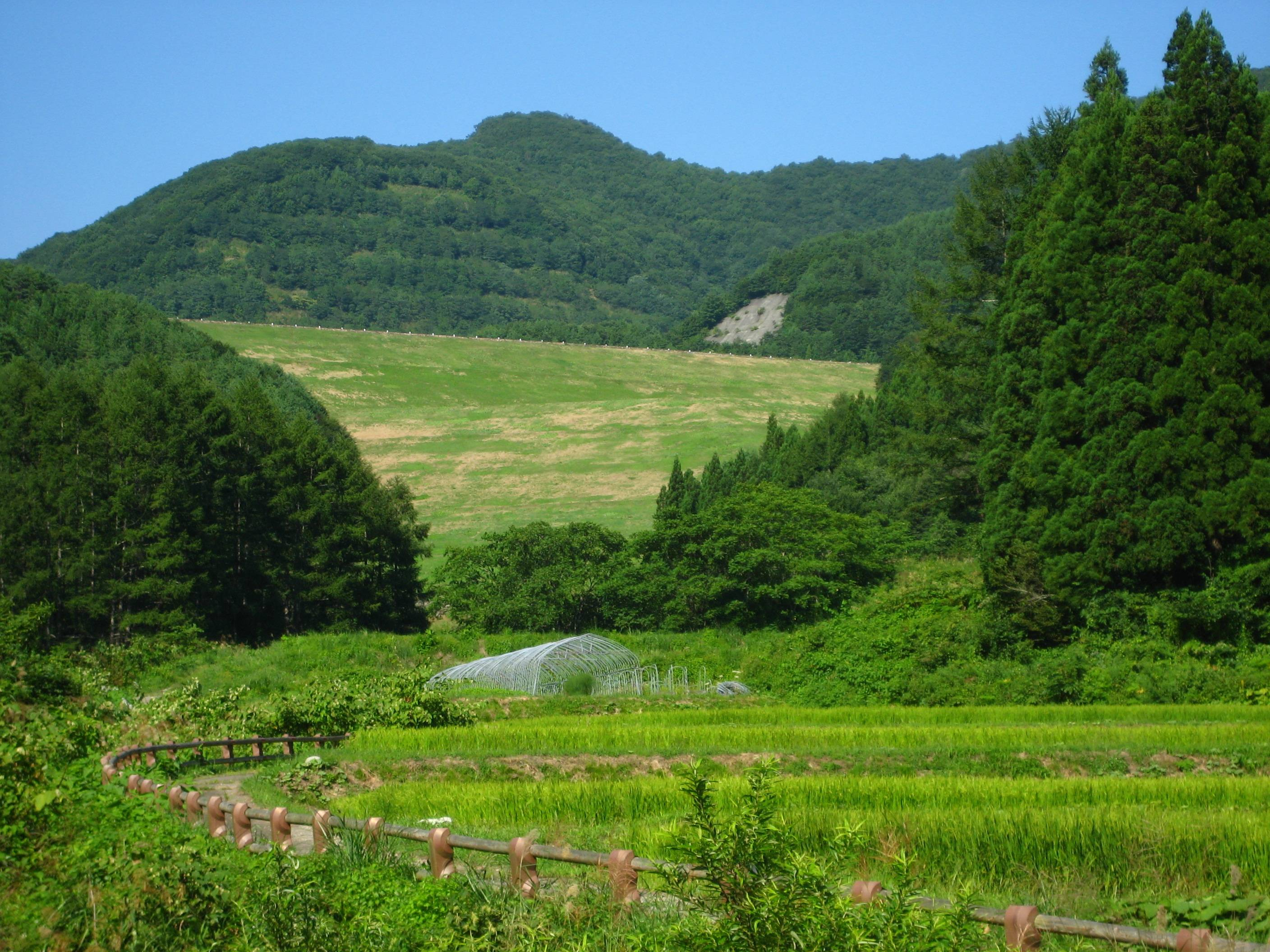
- Interactive map of Ouchi Dam
- Location: Fukushima Prefecture, Japan.
- Coordinates: 37°20′34″N 139°52′20″E
- Construction began: 1974
- Opening date: 1991

Dam and spillways
- Impounds: Ono River
- Height: 102 m
- Length: 340 m

Reservoir
- Total capacity: 18,500,000 m^{3}
- Catchment area: 3.7 km^{2}
- Surface area: 70 hectares

Ouchi Dam is a dam in Fukushima Prefecture, Japan. It supports a 1000 MW hydroelectric power station.
