= J-Power =

Japanese electric utility company

Electric Power Development Company, Limited

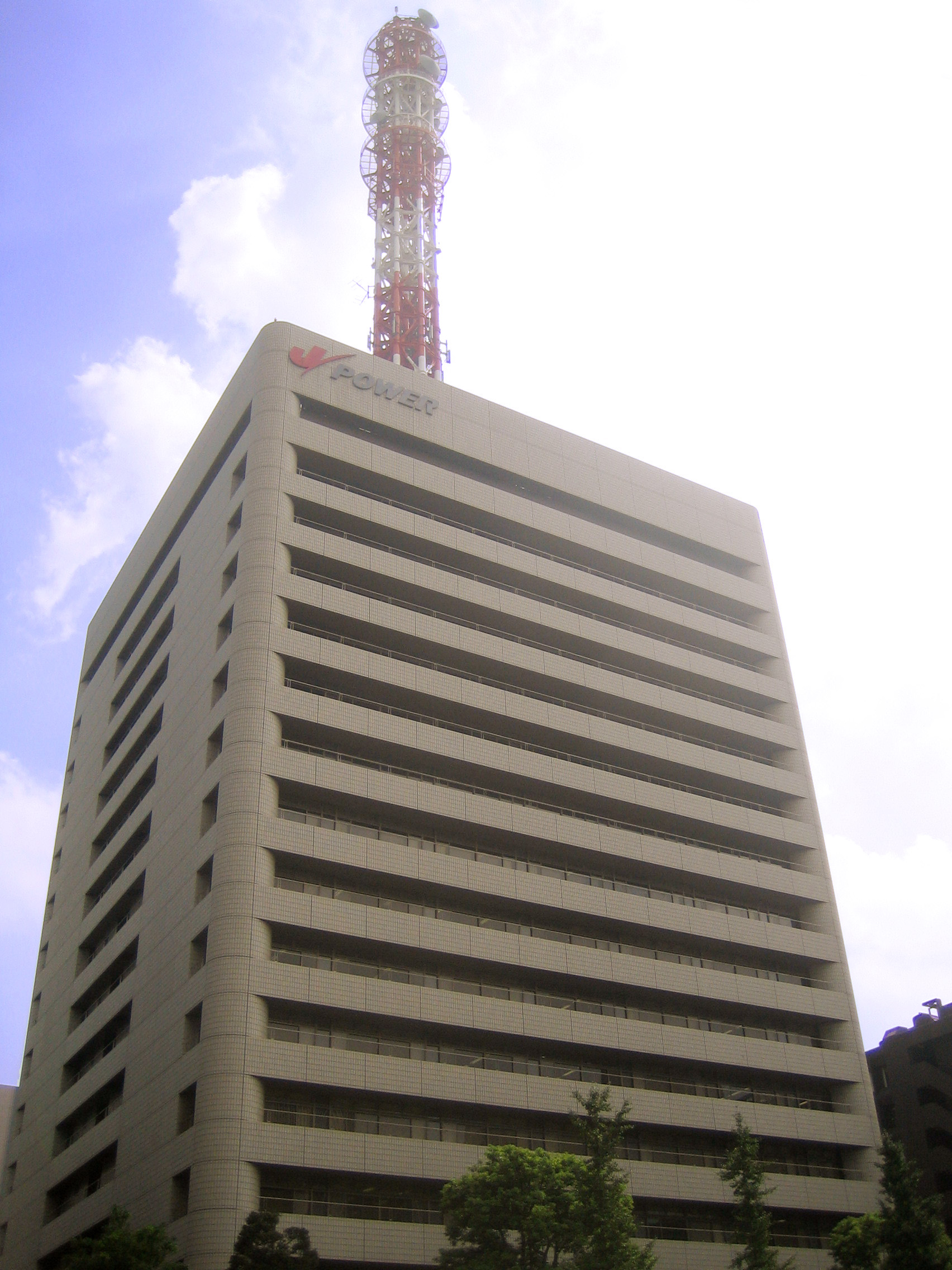
- Trade name: J-POWER
- Company type: Public KK
- Traded as: TYO: 9513
- Industry: Electrical Power
- Founded: 1952
- Headquarters: Ginza, Chuo, Tokyo, Japan
- Key people: Hitoshi Murayama (Chairman); Toshifumi Watanabe (President)
- Revenue: ▲¥ 706,835 million JPY (FY 2014)
- Net income: ▲¥ 28,694 million JPY (FY 2014)
- Owner: Nippon Life (5.48%)
- Number of employees: 2,366 (As of March 31, 2015)
- Website: www.jpower.co.jp

The Electric Power Development Co., Ltd. (電源開発株式会社, Dengen Kaihatsu Kabushiki-gaisha), operating under the brand name J-POWER, formerly Denpatsu (電発), is an electric utility in Japan. It mainly produces electricity from coal and hydroelectric power stations. It also has a few wind farms and is currently building a nuclear plant in Ohma, Aomori prefecture, that is scheduled to begin operations in November 2014. J-Power is the sole operator of the transmission lines connecting the four main islands of Japan.

== History ==
After World War II, as a part of many changes implemented, the Supreme Commander of the Allied Powers ordered the dismantling of Nihon Hassoden K.K. (日本発送電株式会社, Nihon Hassōden Kabushiki-gaisha), which at the time provided electricity to all of Japan with a semi-governmental status. This was broken up into a number of utilities, which have become Japan's modern electric utility companies. However, in the battered state of post-war Japan, there were few investors out there to put money in these new companies, and certainly not enough to allow for sufficient R&D of power sources that Japan needed to keep up with the demand of power, thus it was decided that the occupied government would specially create an electric company with such capabilities. On September 19, 1952 the Electric Power Development Company (EDPC) was established as a government agency.

In 1997, the Japanese government announced the privatization of EDPC, and in 2004, it went public and was listed on the Tokyo Stock Exchange.

== See also ==
- Nuclear power in Japan
