= Aizu-Hinohara Station =

Railway station in Mishima, Fukushima Prefecture, Japan

Aizu-Hinohara Station 会津桧原駅
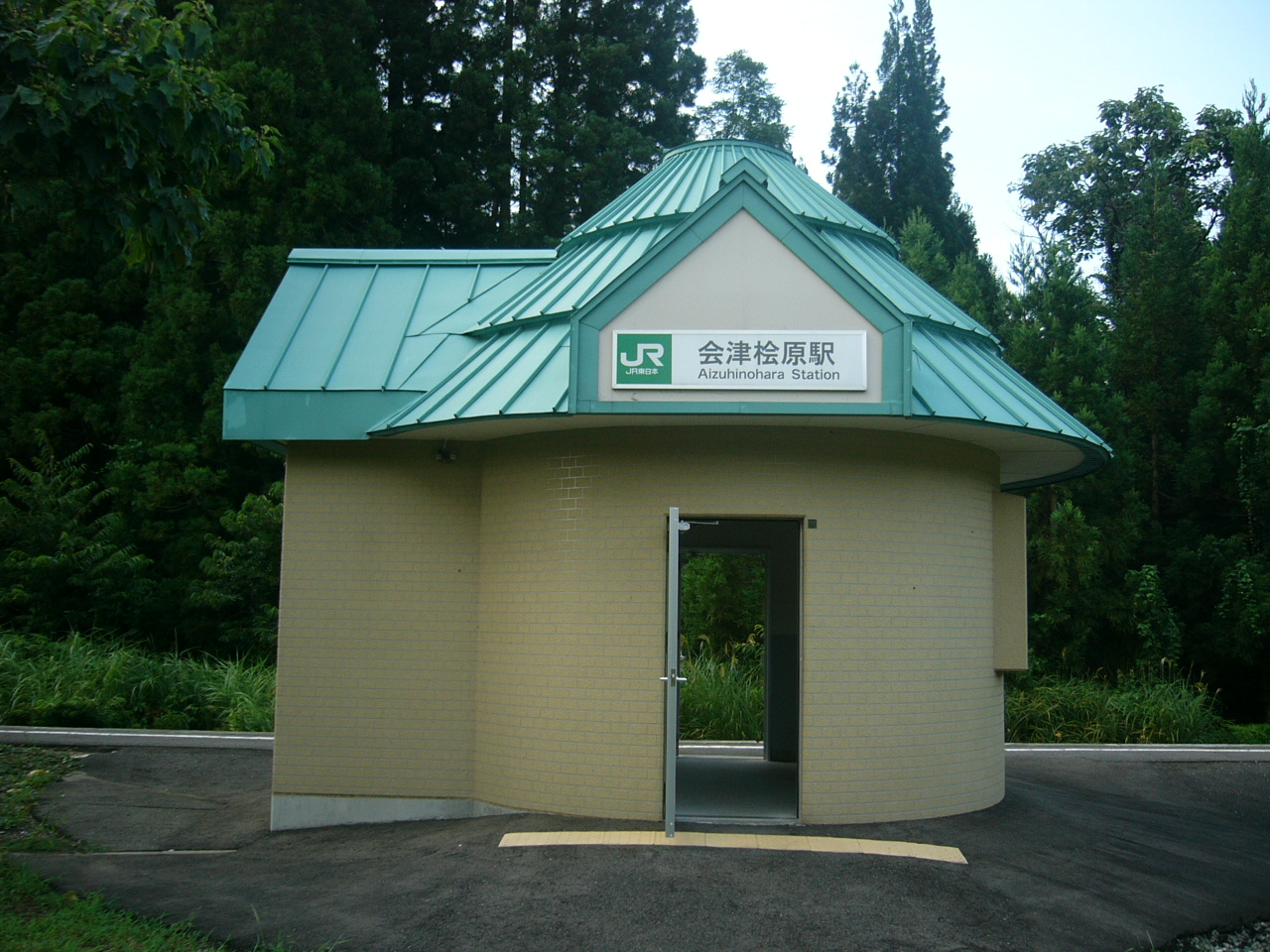
- Aizu-Hinohara Station in April 2006

General information
- Location: 2383 Hinohara, Mishima-machi, Ōnuma-gun, Fukushima-ken 969-7513; Japan
- Coordinates: 37°29′31″N 139°40′46″E
- Operator: JR East
- Line: ■ Tadami Line
- Distance: 41.5 km from Aizu-Wakamatsu
- Platforms: 1 side platform
- Tracks: 1

Other information
- Status: Unstaffed
- Website: Official website

History
- Opened: 28 October 1941

Services
Preceding station	JR East	Following station
Aizu-Nishikata towards Koide	Tadami Line	Takiya towards Aizu-Wakamatsu
Location
- Location within JR Tadami Line Location within Fukushima Prefecture Location within Japan

Aizu-Hinohara Station (会津桧原駅, Aizu-Hinohara-eki) is a railway station on the Tadami Line in the town of Mishima, Ōnuma District, Fukushima Prefecture, Japan, operated by East Japan Railway Company (JR East).

== Lines ==
Aizu-Hinohara Station is served by the Tadami Line, and is located 41.5 kilometers from the official starting point of the line at Aizu-Wakamatsu.

== Station layout ==
Aizu-Hinohara Station has one side platform serving a single bi-directional track. The station is unattended.

== History ==
Aizu-Hinohara Station opened on October 28, 1941, as an intermediate station on the extension of eastern section of the Japanese National Railways (JNR) Tadami Line between Aizu-Yanaizu and Aizu-Miyashita. The station was absorbed into the JR East network upon the privatization of the JNR on April 1, 1987.

== Surrounding area ==
- National Route 252
- Tadami River

== See also ==
- List of railway stations in Japan
