= Aizu-Nishikata Station =

Railway station in Mishima, Fukushima Prefecture, Japan

Aizu-Nishikata Station 会津西方駅
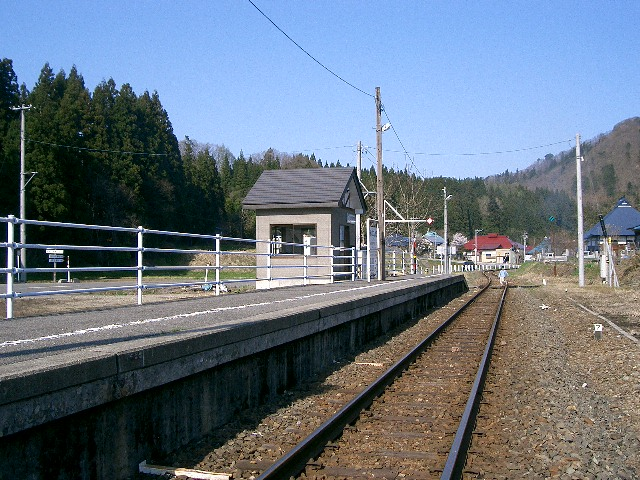
- Aizu-Nishikata Station in May 2006

General information
- Location: 1342 Nairi Negashiya-daira, Mishima-machi, Ōnuma-gun, Fukushima-ken 969-7402; Japan
- Coordinates: 37.4810°N 139.6617°E
- Operator: JR East
- Line: ■ Tadami Line
- Distance: 43.7 km from Aizu-Wakamatsu
- Platforms: 1 side platform
- Tracks: 1

Other information
- Status: Unstaffed
- Website: Official website

History
- Opened: October 28, 1941

Services
Preceding station	JR East	Following station
Aizu-Miyashita towards Koide	Tadami Line	Aizu-Hinohara towards Aizu-Wakamatsu
Location
- Location within JR Tadami Line Location within Fukushima Prefecture Location within Japan

Aizu-Nishikata Station (会津西方駅, Aizu-Nishikata-eki) is a railway station on the Tadami Line in the town of Mishima, Ōnuma District, Fukushima Prefecture, Japan, operated by East Japan Railway Company (JR East).

== Lines ==
Aizu-Nishikata Station is served by the Tadami Line, and is located 43.7 kilometers from the official starting point of the line at Aizu-Wakamatsu.

== Station layout ==
Aizu-Nishikata Station has one side platform serving a single bi-directional track. There is no station building, but only a shelter on the platform. The station is unattended.

== History ==
Aizu-Nishikata Station opened on October 28, 1941, as an intermediate station on the extension of eastern section of the Japanese National Railways (JNR) Tadami Line between Aizu-Yanaizu and Aizu-Miyashita. The station was absorbed into the JR East network upon the privatization of the JNR on April 1, 1987.

== Surrounding area ==
- National Route 400
- Tadami River

== See also ==
- List of railway stations in Japan
