= Aizu-Nakagawa Station =

Railway station in Kaneyama, Fukushima Prefecture, Japan

Aizu-Nakagawa Station 会津中川駅
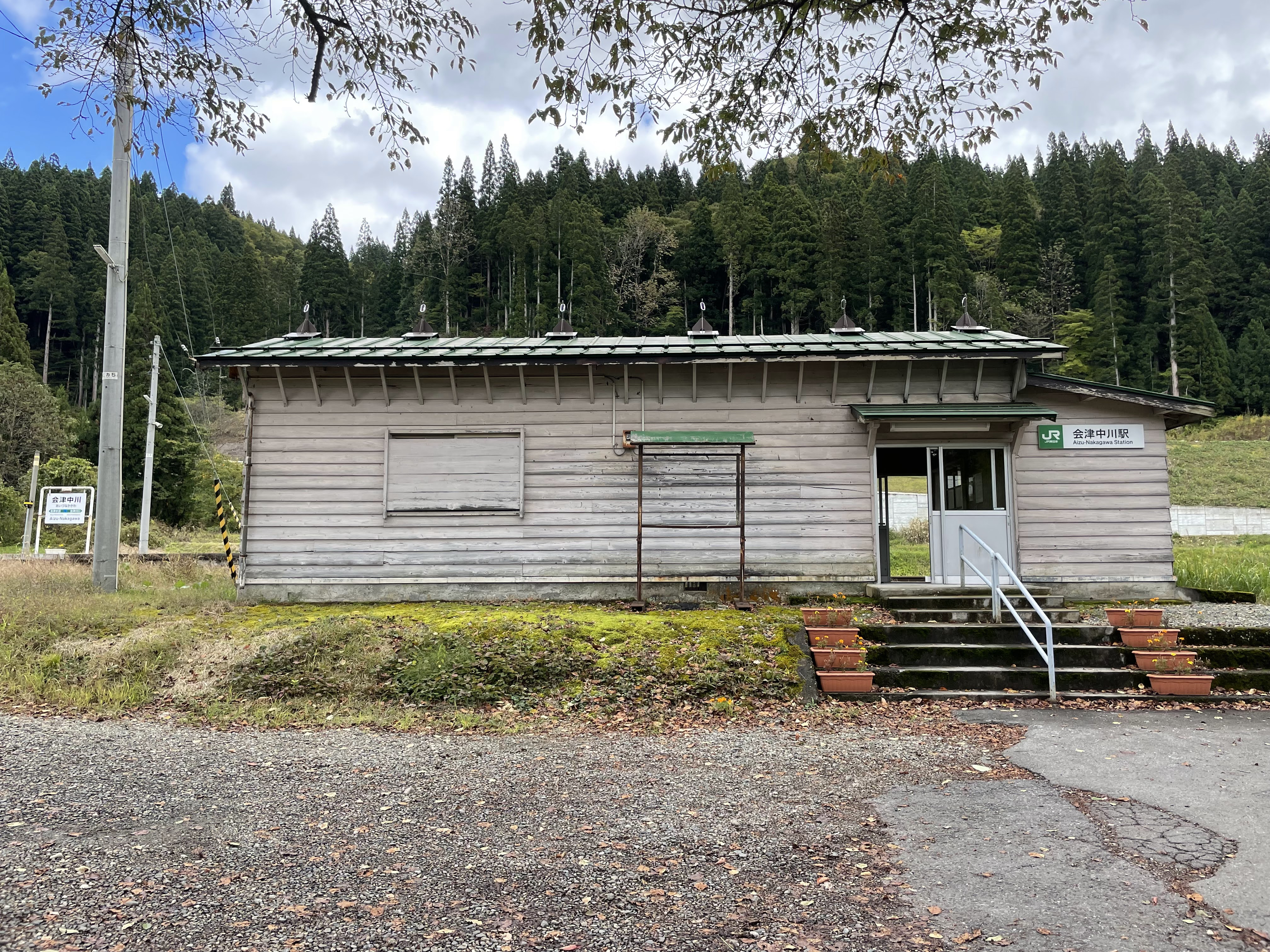
- Aizu-Nakagawa Station in October 2021

General information
- Location: Nagagawa Bange, Kaneyama-machi, Ōnuma-gun, Fukushima-ken 968-0006; Japan
- Coordinates: 37.4740°N 139.5321°E
- Operator: JR East
- Line: ■ Tadami Line
- Distance: 58.3 km from Aizu-Wakamatsu
- Platforms: 1 side platform
- Tracks: 1

Other information
- Status: Unstaffed
- Website: Official website

History
- Opened: September 20, 1956

Passengers
- 2004: 5 daily

Services
Preceding station	JR East	Following station
Aizu-Kawaguchi towards Koide	Tadami Line	Aizu-Mizunuma towards Aizu-Wakamatsu
Location
- Location within JR Tadami Line Location within Fukushima Prefecture Location within Japan

Aizu-Nakagawa Station (会津中川駅, Aizu-Nakagawa-eki) is a railway station on the Tadami Line in the town of Kaneyama, Ōnuma District, Fukushima Prefecture, Japan, operated by East Japan Railway Company (JR East).

== Lines ==
Aizu-Nakagawa Station is served by the Tadami Line, and is located 58.3 kilometers from the official starting point of the line at Aizu-Wakamatsu.

== Station layout ==
Aizu-Nakagawa Station has one side platform serving a single bi-directional track. The station is unattended.

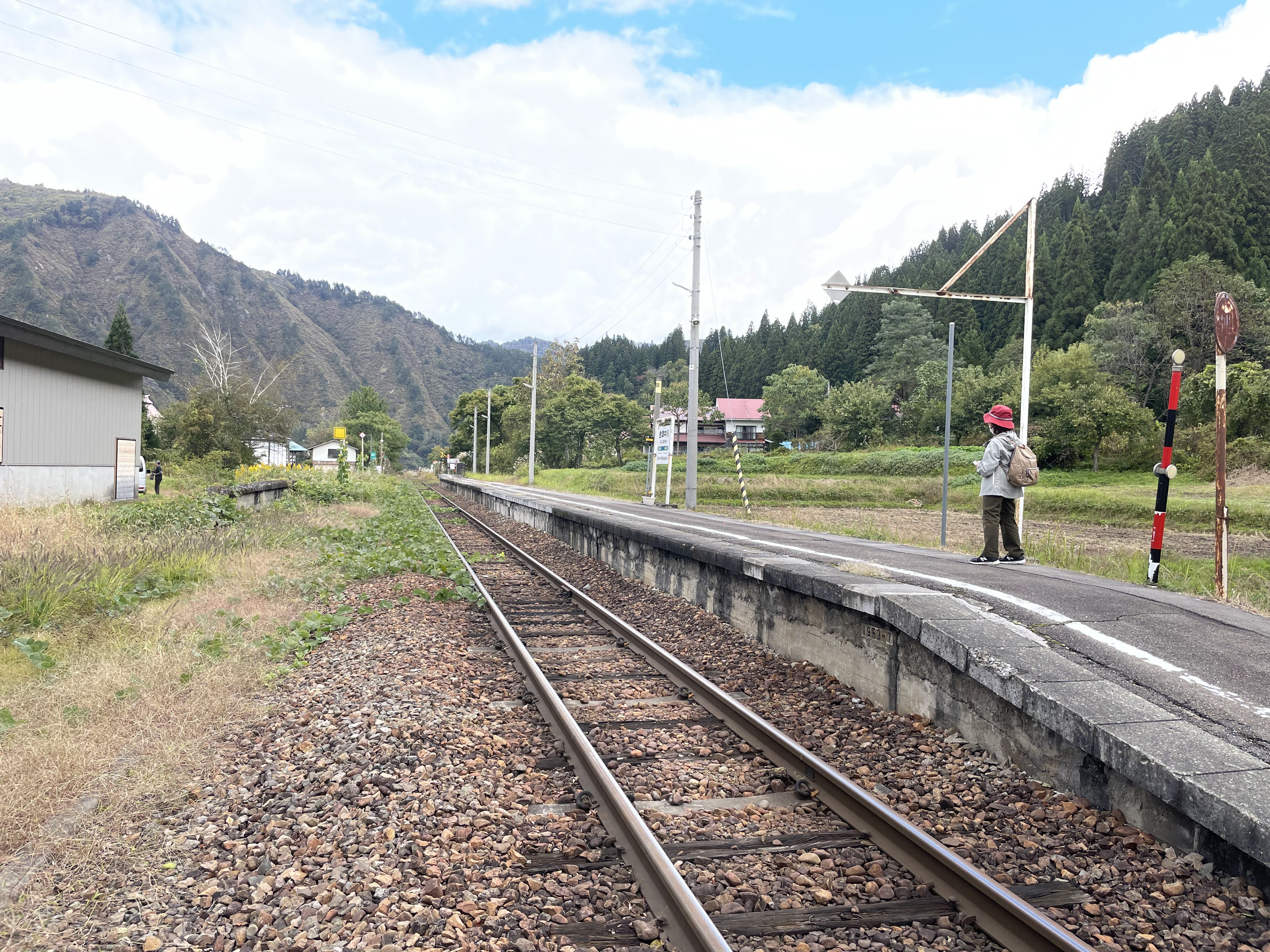
Station Platform

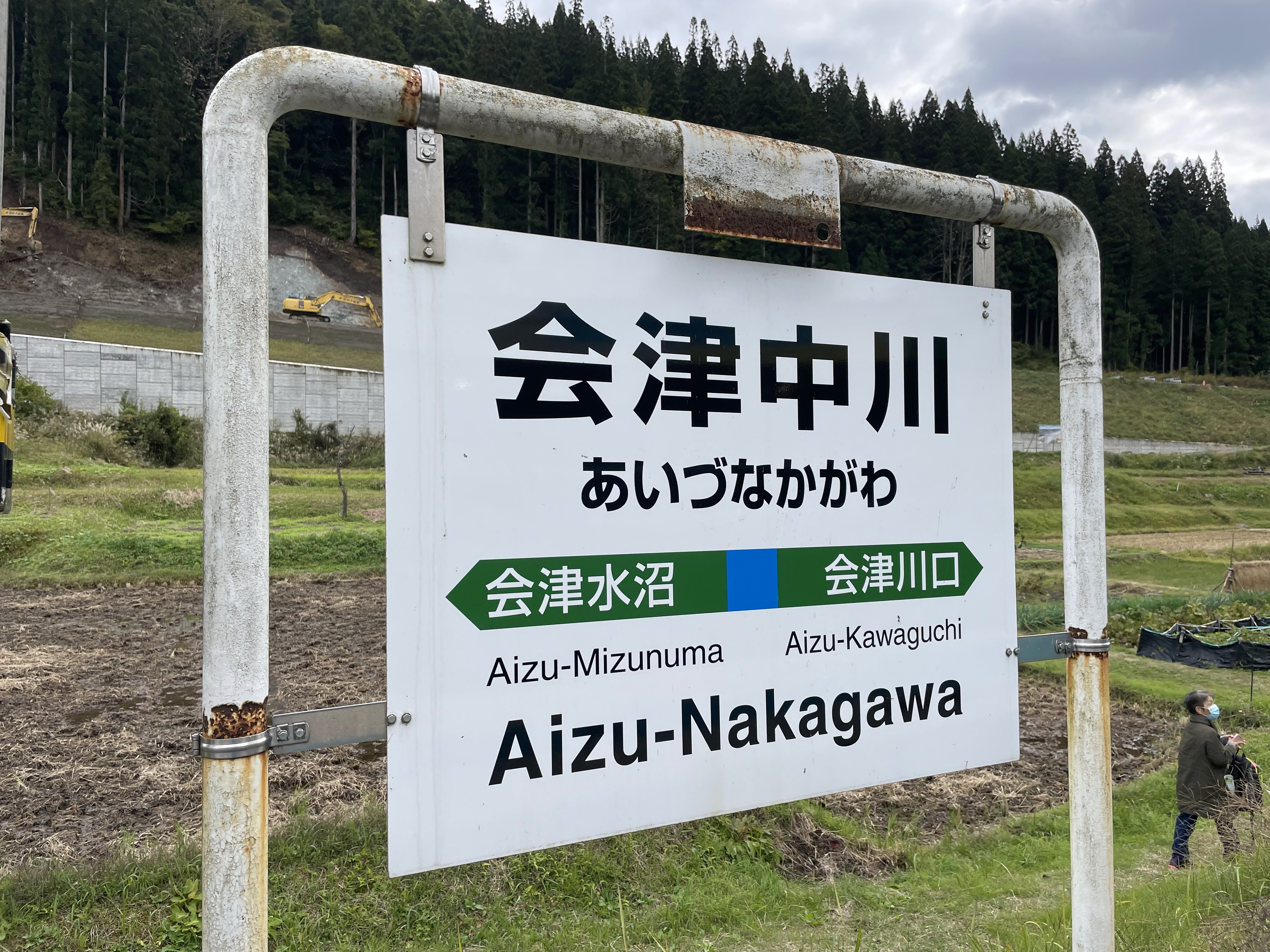
Station name sign

== History ==
Aizu-Nakagawa Station opened on September 20, 1956, as an intermediate station on the extension of eastern section of the Japanese National Railways (JNR) Tadami Line between Aizu-Miyashita and Aizu-Kawaguchi. The station was absorbed into the JR East network upon the privatization of the JNR on April 1, 1987.

== Surrounding area ==
- Numazawa Onsen
- Nakagawa Post Office
- Tadami River
- National Route 252

== See also ==
- List of railway stations in Japan
