= Yanaizu =

Yanaizu may refer to:

- Yanaizu, Fukushima, a town in Fukushima Prefecture, Japan
- Yanaizu, Gifu, a former town in Gifu Prefecture, Japan

== See also ==
- Yanaizu Station (disambiguation)
- Yanaizu Dam, a gravity dam on the Tadami River, Fukushima Prefecture, Japan
