= Takiya Station =

Railway station in Yanaizu, Fukushima Prefecture, Japan

Takiya Station 滝谷駅
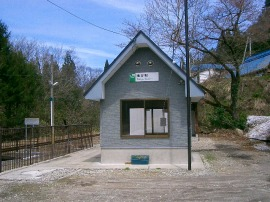
- Takiya Station in April 2006

General information
- Location: Gōdo, Yanaizu-machi, Kawanuma-gun, Fukushima-ken 969-7205; Japan
- Coordinates: 37.4947°N 139.6985°E
- Operator: JR East
- Line: ■ Tadami Line
- Distance: 39.6 km from Aizu-Wakamatsu
- Platforms: 1 side platform
- Tracks: 1

Other information
- Status: Unstaffed
- Website: Official website

History
- Opened: October 28, 1941

Services
Preceding station	JR East	Following station
Aizu-Hinohara towards Koide	Tadami Line	Gōdo towards Aizu-Wakamatsu
Location
- Location within JR Tadami Line Location within Fukushima Prefecture Location within Japan

Takiya Station (滝谷駅, Takiya-eki) is a railway station on the Tadami Line in the town of Yanaizu, Fukushima Prefecture, Japan, operated by East Japan Railway Company (JR East).

== Lines ==
Takiya Station is served by the Tadami Line, and is located 39.6 rail kilometers from the official starting point of the line at Aizu-Wakamatsu.

== Station layout ==
Takiya Station has one side platform serving a single bi-directional track. The station is unattended.

== History ==
Takiya Station opened on October 28, 1941, as an intermediate station on the extension of eastern section of the Japanese National Railways (JNR) Tadami Line between Aizu-Yanaizu and Aizu-Miyashita. The station was absorbed into the JR East network upon the privatization of the JNR on April 1, 1987.

== Surrounding area ==
- NIshiyama Onsen

== See also ==
- List of railway stations in Japan
