= Yanaizu, Fukushima =

Yanaizu 柳津町
- Town
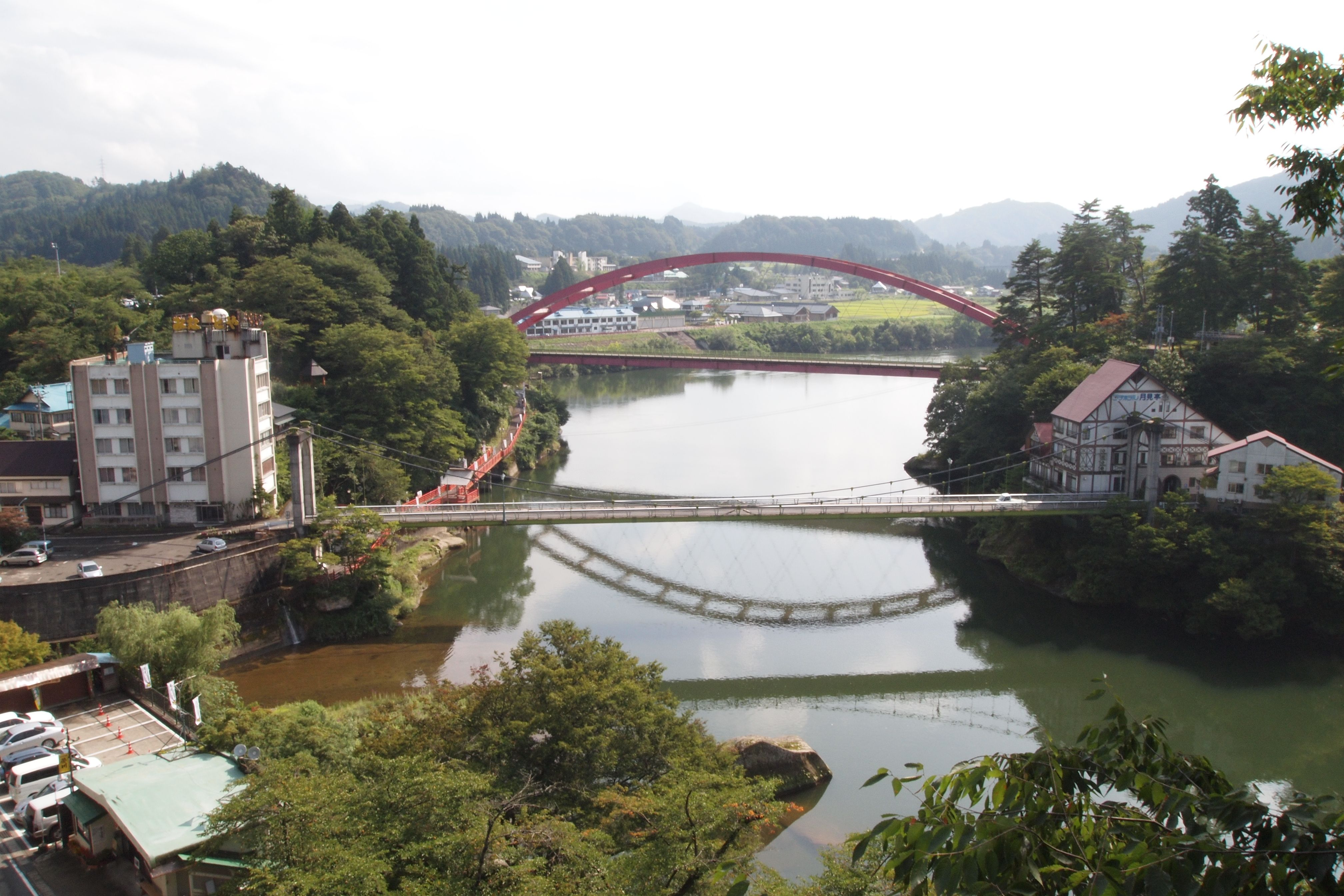
- Tadami River in Yanaizu

- Flag Seal

- Location of Yanaizu in Fukushima Prefecture

- Coordinates: 37°31′33.8″N 139°43′10.6″E
- Country: Japan
- Region: Tōhoku
- Prefecture: Fukushima
- District: Kawanuma

Area
  - Total: 175.82 km^{2} (67.88 sq mi)

Population (November 2019)
  - Total: 3,304
  - Density: 18.79/km^{2} (48.67/sq mi)
- Time zone: UTC+9 (Japan Standard Time)
- Tree: Willow
- Flower: Paulownia tomentosa
- Bird: Japanese bush warbler
- Phone number: 0241-42-2112
- Address: 234 Shimohiraotsu Yanaizu, Yanaizu-machi, Kawanuma-gun, Fukushima-ken 969-7201
- Website: Official website

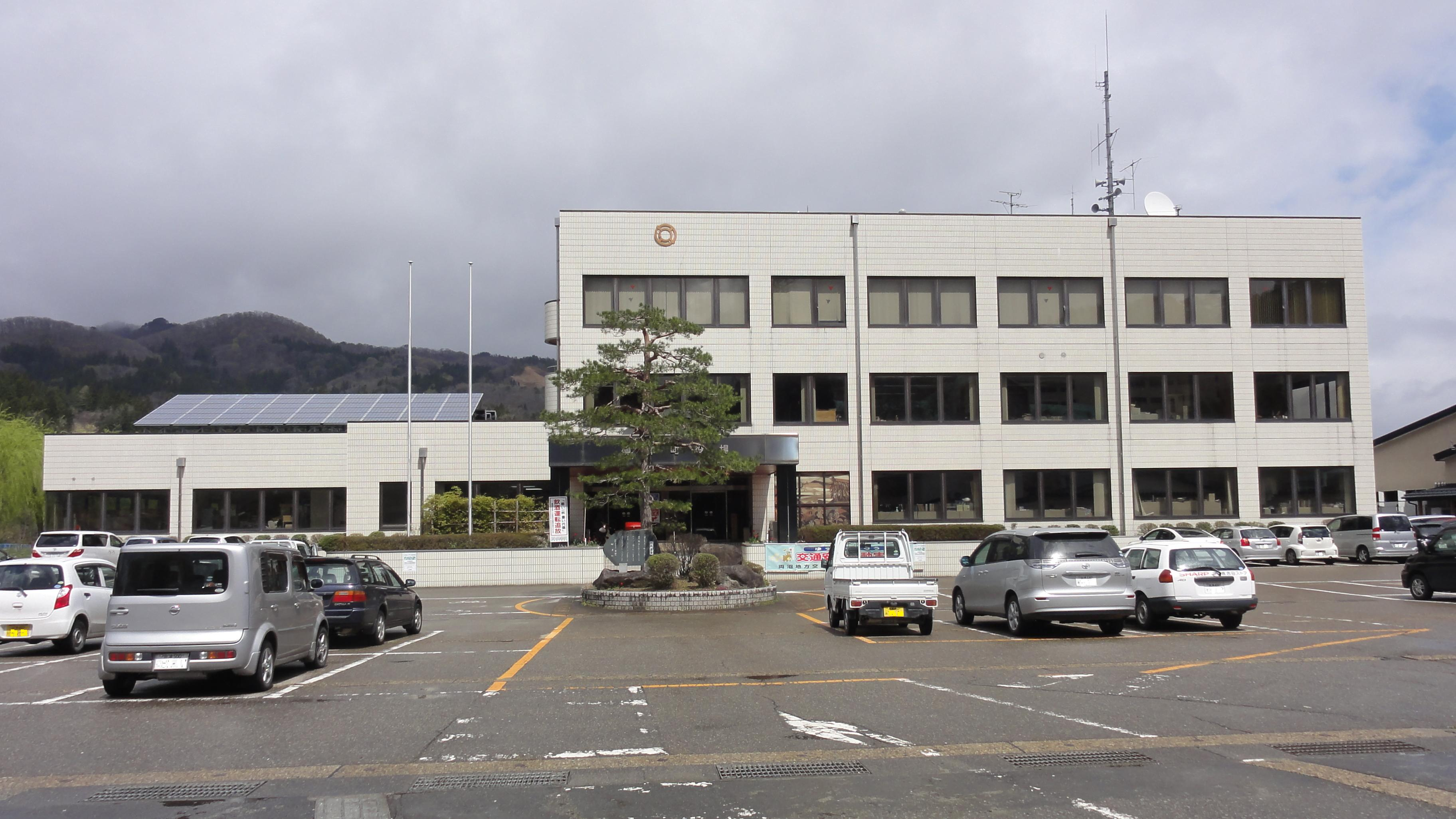
Yanaizu Town Hall

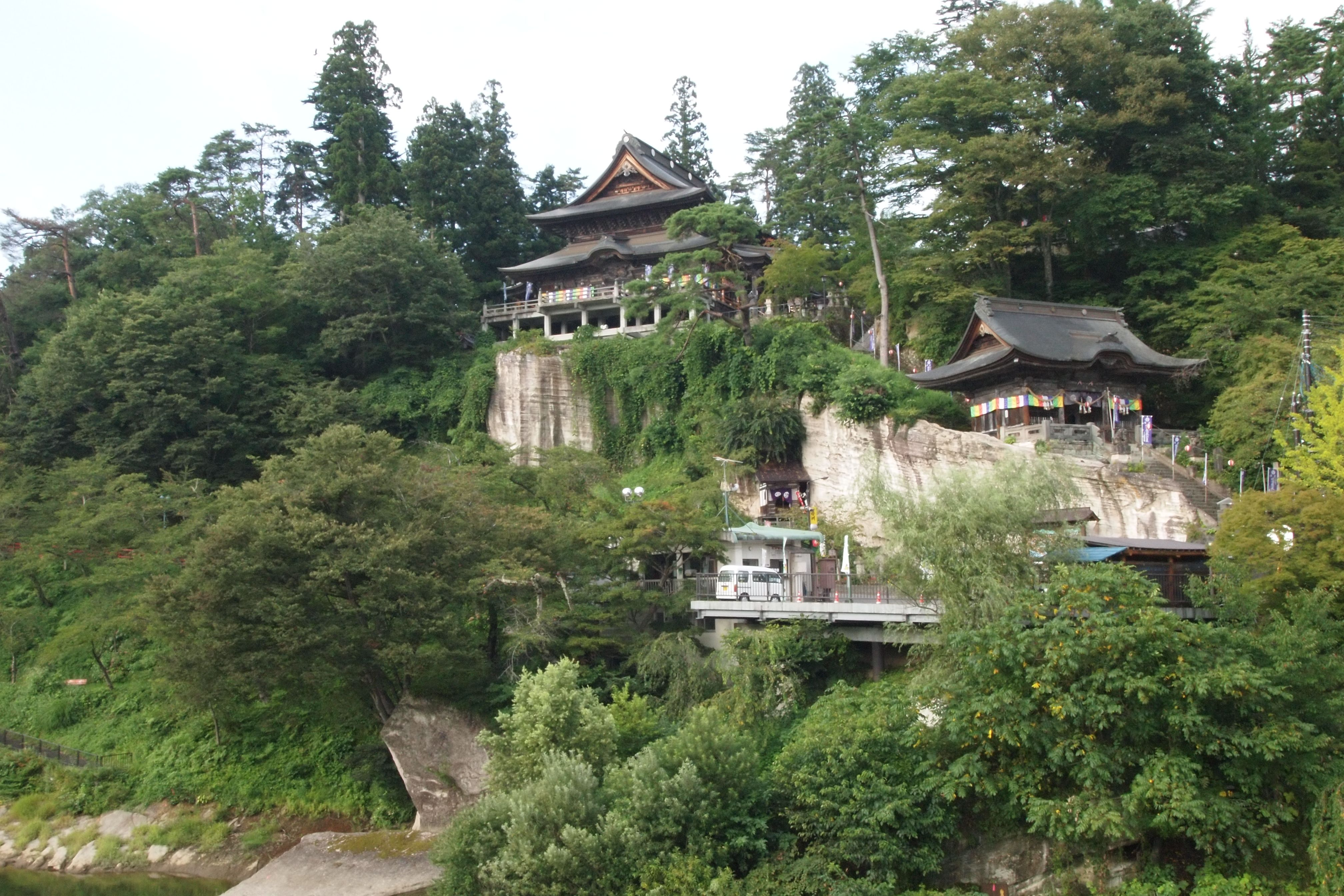
Enzō-ji

Yanaizu (柳津町, Yanaizu-machi) is a town located in Fukushima Prefecture, Japan. As of 1 November 2019, the town had an estimated population of 3,304 in 1,269 households, and a population density of 19 persons per km^{2}. The total area of the town was 175.82 square kilometres (67.88 sq mi).

== Geography ==
Yanaizu is located in the northern portion of the Aizu region of Fukushima Prefecture.The Takitani River flows north and south through the town and joins the Tadami River, which crosses the northern part of the town. The southern part of the town is mountainous.

- Mountains : Mount Hakase
- Rivers : Tadami River, Takitani River

=== Neighboring municipalities ===
Fukushima Prefecture

- Aizubange
- Aizumisato
- Kaneyama
- Mishima
- Nishiaizu
- Shōwa

== Climate ==
Yanaizu has a humid continental climate (Köppen Dfb) characterized by warm summers and cold winters with heavy snowfall. The average annual temperature in Yanaizu is 11.7 °C. The average annual rainfall is 1428 mm with September as the wettest month. The temperatures are highest on average in August, at around 25.3 °C, and lowest in January, at around -0.9 °C.

== Demographics ==
Per Japanese census data, the population of Yanaizu has declined steadily over the past 70 years and is now much less than it was a century ago.

Historical population
Year	Pop.	±%
1920	7,673	—
1930	8,232	+7.3%
1940	8,741	+6.2%
1950	9,632	+10.2%
1960	9,035	−6.2%
1970	6,817	−24.5%
1980	5,678	−16.7%
1990	5,343	−5.9%
2000	4,669	−12.6%
2010	4,009	−14.1%
2020	3,081	−23.1%

== History ==
The area of present-day Yanaizu was part of ancient Mutsu Province. The area formed part of the holdings of Aizu Domain during the Edo period. After the Meiji Restoration, the area was organized as part of Kawanuma District, Fukushima Prefecture. The village of Yanaizu was founded with the establishment of the modern municipalities system on April 1, 1898. Yanaizu annexed the neighboring villages of Kurado and Iitani on May 1, 1921. The village was raised to town status on May 20, 1942. On March 31, 1955, Yanaizu annexed the neighboring village of Nishiyama from Ōnuma District, Fukushima.

== Economy ==
The economy of Yanaizu is based primarily on agriculture, with seasonal tourism.

== Education ==
Yanaizu has two public elementary schools and one public junior high school operated by the town government. The town does not have a high school.

== Transportation ==
=== Railway ===
JR East – Tadami Line

- Aizu-Yanaizu - Gōdo - Takiya

=== Highway ===
- National Route 49
- National Route 252
- National Route 400

== Local attractions ==
- Enzō-ji, Buddhist temple, the site of a Hadaka Matsuri every January 7. This festival was featured in the NHK World program "Out & About" on February 10, 2008.
- Meibutsu
  - Akabeko
  - Awa-manju - millet based steamed buns stuffed with red bean paste
- Nishiama Onsen
- Saitō Kiyoshi Art Museum
- Yanaizu Onsen
