= Gōdo Station (Fukushima) =

Railway station in Yanaizu, Fukushima Prefecture, Japan

Gōdo Station 郷戸駅
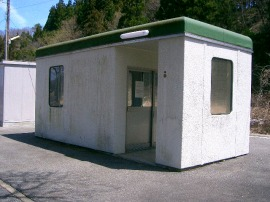
- Gōdo Station in April 2006

General information
- Location: Gōdo, Yanaizu-machi, Kawanuma-gun, Fukushima-ken 969-7201; Japan
- Coordinates: 37.5166°N 139.7100°E
- Operator: JR East
- Line: ■ Tadami Line
- Distance: 36.9 km from Aizu-Wakamatsu
- Platforms: 1 side platform
- Tracks: 1

Other information
- Status: Unstaffed
- Website: Official website

History
- Opened: October 28, 1941

Services
Preceding station	JR East	Following station
Takiya towards Koide	Tadami Line	Aizu-Yanaizu towards Aizu-Wakamatsu
Location
- Location within JR Tadami Line Location within Fukushima Prefecture Location within Japan

Gōdo Station (郷戸駅, Gōdo-eki) is a railway station on the Tadami Line in the town of Yanaizu, Fukushima Prefecture, Japan, operated by East Japan Railway Company (JR East).

== Lines ==
Gōdo Station is served by the Tadami Line, and is located 36.9 kilometers from the official starting point of the line at Aizu-Wakamatsu.

== Station layout ==
Gōdo Station has one side platform serving a single bi-directional track. The station is unattended.

== History ==
Gōdo Station opened on October 28, 1941, as an intermediate station on the extension of eastern section of the Japanese National Railways (JNR) Tadami Line between Aizu-Yanaizu and Aizu-Miyashita. The station was absorbed into the JR East network upon the privatization of the JNR on April 1, 1987.

== Surrounding area ==
- Yanaizu Dam
- National Route 252

== See also ==
- List of railway stations in Japan
