= Mishima, Fukushima =

Mishima 三島町
- Town
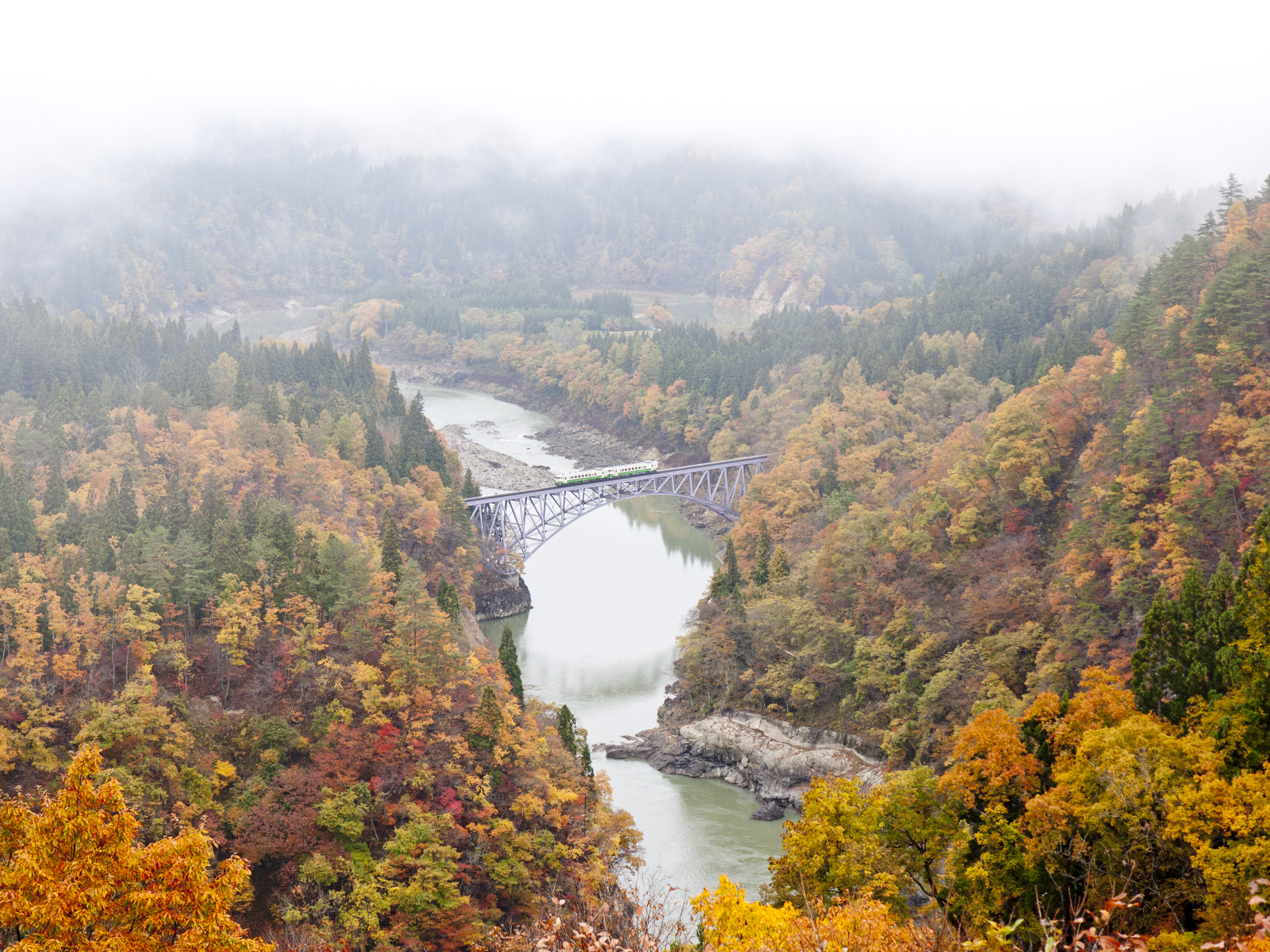
- Bridge on Tadami River

- Flag Seal

- Location of Mishima in Fukushima Prefecture

- Coordinates: 37°28′13.1″N 139°38′40.1″E
- Country: Japan
- Region: Tōhoku
- Prefecture: Fukushima
- District: Ōnuma

Area
  - Total: 90.81 km^{2} (35.06 sq mi)

Population (March 2020)
  - Total: 1,590
  - Density: 17.5/km^{2} (45.3/sq mi)
- Time zone: UTC+9 (Japan Standard Time)
- Tree: Paulownia tomentosa
- Flower: Prunus sargentii
- Bird: Varied tit
- Phone number: 0241-48-5533
- Address: 350 Miyashita Mishima-machi, Ōnuma-gun, Fukushima-ken 969-7511
- Website: Official website

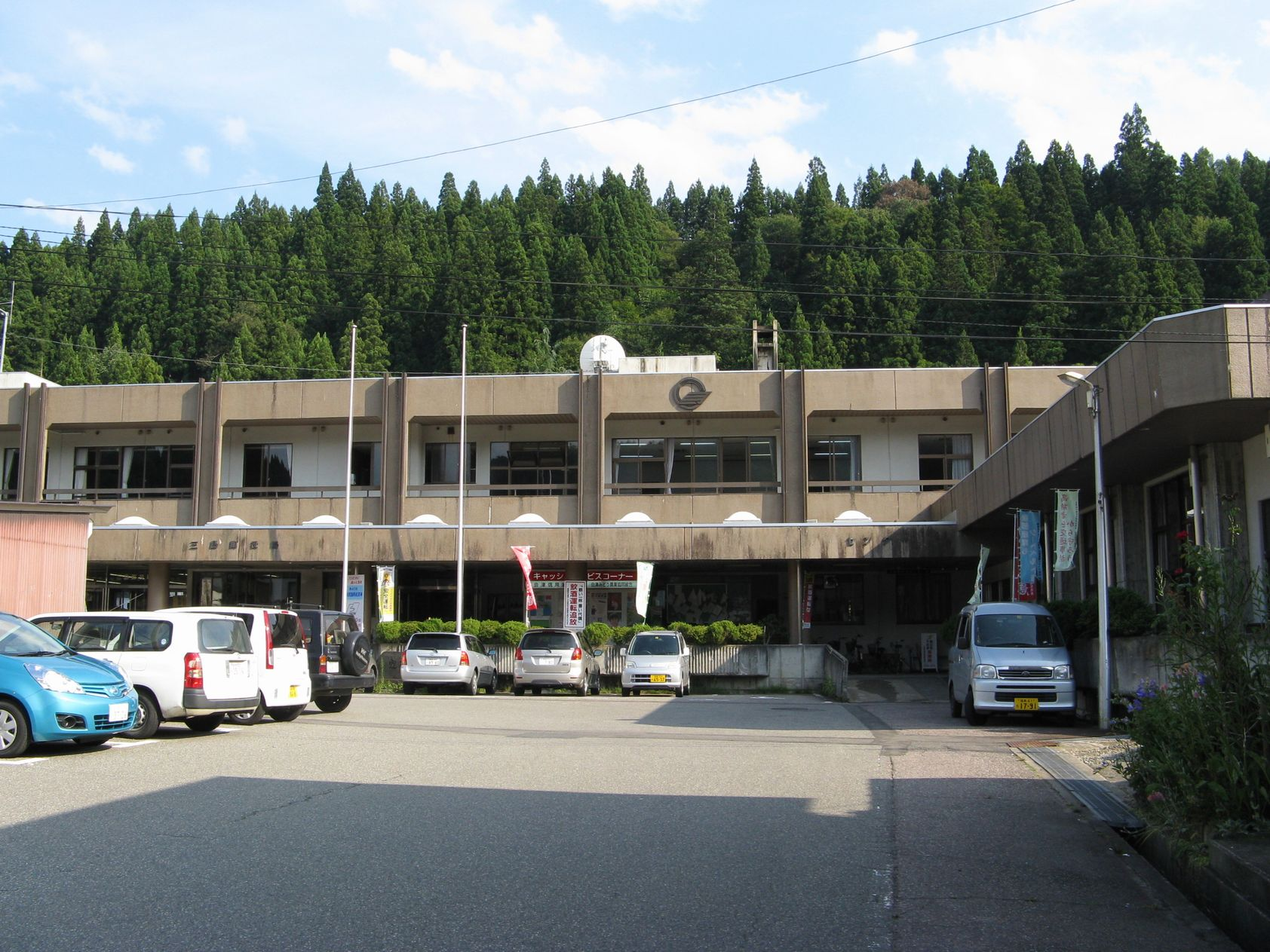
Mishima Town Hall

Mishima (三島町, Mishima-machi) is a town located in Fukushima Prefecture, Japan. As of 1 March 2020, the town had an estimated population of 1,590 in 755 households, and a population density of 18 persons per square kilometre (47 per square mile). The total area of the town was 90.81 square kilometres (35.06 sq mi). In 2017, Mishima was selected as one of The Most Beautiful Villages in Japan.

== Geography ==
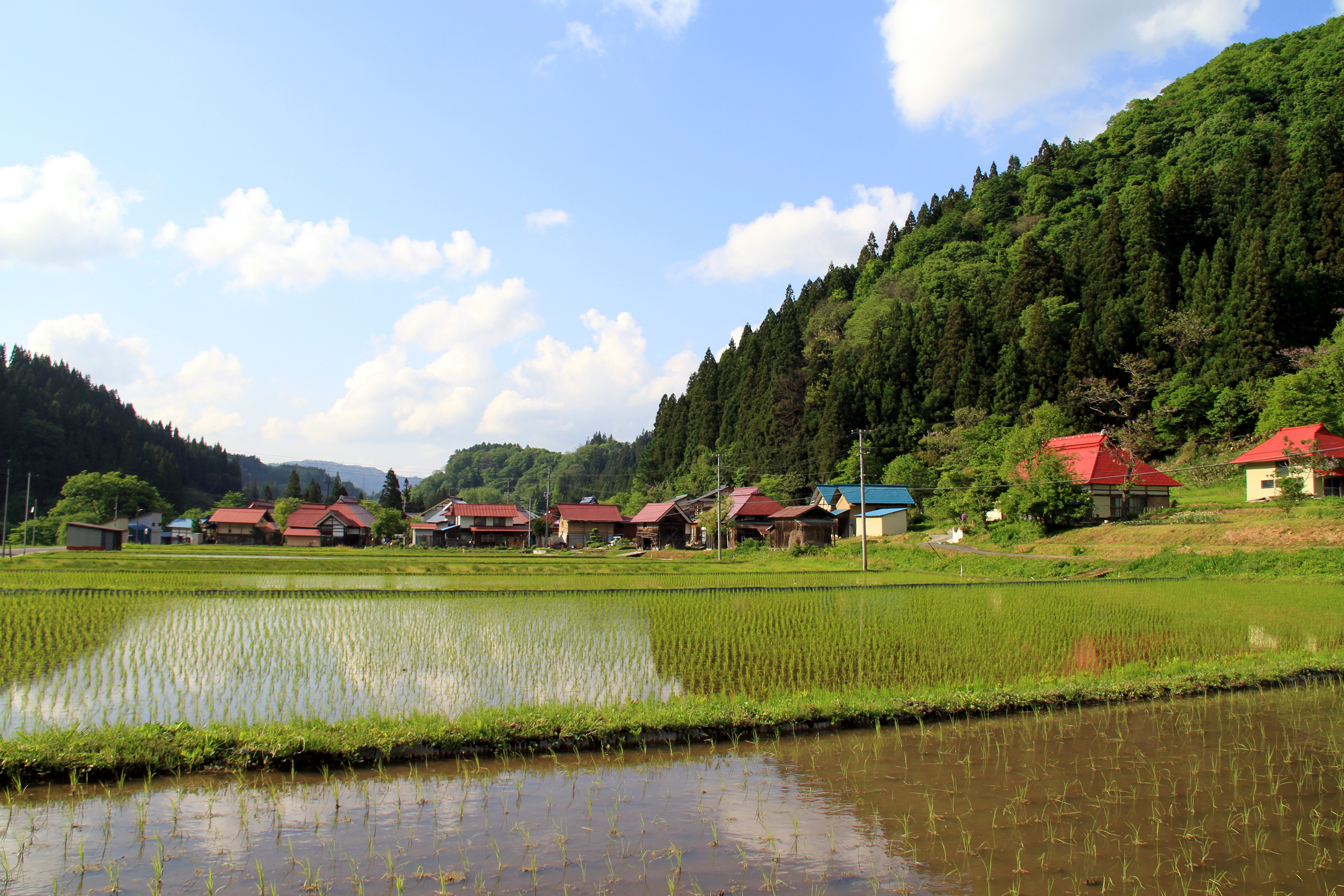
Scenery in the town

Mishima is located in the western portion of the Aizu region of Fukushima Prefecture. Most of the town is covered with forests. Traffic is concentrated along the Tadami River in the northern part of the town, and the main functions of the town such as government offices and hospitals are located in the Miyashita area. Miyashita Dam is located slightly upstream, and there is a hydroelectric power plant using the dam. The town has a number of hot springs.

- Mountains: Mount Takamori
- Rivers: Tadami River
- Lakes: Miyashita Dam

=== Neighboring municipalities ===
Fukushima Prefecture

- Kaneyama
- Shōwa
- Yanaizu

=== Climate ===
Mishima has a humid continental climate/oceanic climate (Köppen Dfb/Cfb) characterized by warm summers and cold winters with heavy snowfall. The average annual temperature in Mishima is 11.5 °C (52.7 °F). The average annual rainfall is 1,477 mm (58.1 in) with September as the wettest month. The temperatures are highest on average in August, at around 25.2 °C (77.4 °F), and lowest in January, at around −1.1 °C (30.0 °F).

== Demographics ==
Per Japanese census data, the population of Mishima has declined steadily over the past 70 years.

Historical population
| Year | Pop. | ±% |
|---|---|---|
| 1920 | 4,518 | — |
| 1930 | 4,728 | +4.6% |
| 1940 | 5,287 | +11.8% |
| 1950 | 7,721 | +46.0% |
| 1960 | 5,803 | −24.8% |
| 1970 | 4,108 | −29.2% |
| 1980 | 3,389 | −17.5% |
| 1990 | 2,886 | −14.8% |
| 2000 | 2,474 | −14.3% |
| 2010 | 1,926 | −22.2% |
| 2020 | 1,452 | −24.6% |

== History ==
The area of present-day Mishima was part of ancient Mutsu Province and formed part of the holdings of Aizu Domain during the Edo period. After the Meiji Restoration, it was organized as part of Ōnuma District in Fukushima Prefecture. Mishima village was founded on July 1, 1955, through a merger of the villages of Miyashita and Nishikata. It was raised to town status on April 1, 1961.

== Economy ==
Hydroelectric power generation from numerous dams on the Tadami River is the primary source of revenue for the town, along with forestry and wood products.

== Education ==
Mishima has one public elementary school and one public junior high school operated by the town government. The town does not have a high school.

- Mishima Town Mishima Middle School
- Mishima Town Mishima Elementary School

== Transportation ==
=== Railway ===
JR East – Tadami Line

- Aizu-Hinohara - Aizu-Nishikata - Aizu-Miyashita - Hayato

=== Highway ===
- National Route 252
- National Route 400

== Local attractions ==
Mishima Sai-no-kami Festival, a National Intangible Cultural Property
