= Nakagawa Station =

Nakagawa Station is the name of multiple train stations in Japan.

- Nakagawa Station (Yamagata) (中川駅) - a train station on the JR East Tadami Line in Nanyo, Yamagata Prefecture
- Nakagawa Station (Kanagawa) (中川駅) - a train station on the Yokohama Municipal Subway Blue Line in Tsuzuki-ku, Yokohama, Kanagawa Prefecture
- Aizu-Nakagawa Station (会津中川駅) - a train station on the JR East Tadami Line in Kaneyama, Onuma District, Fukushima Prefecture
- Ise-Nakagawa Station (伊勢中川駅) - a train station of Kintetsu Railway Line in Matsusaka, Mie Prefecture
