= Shōwa, Fukushima =

Shōwa 昭和村
- Village
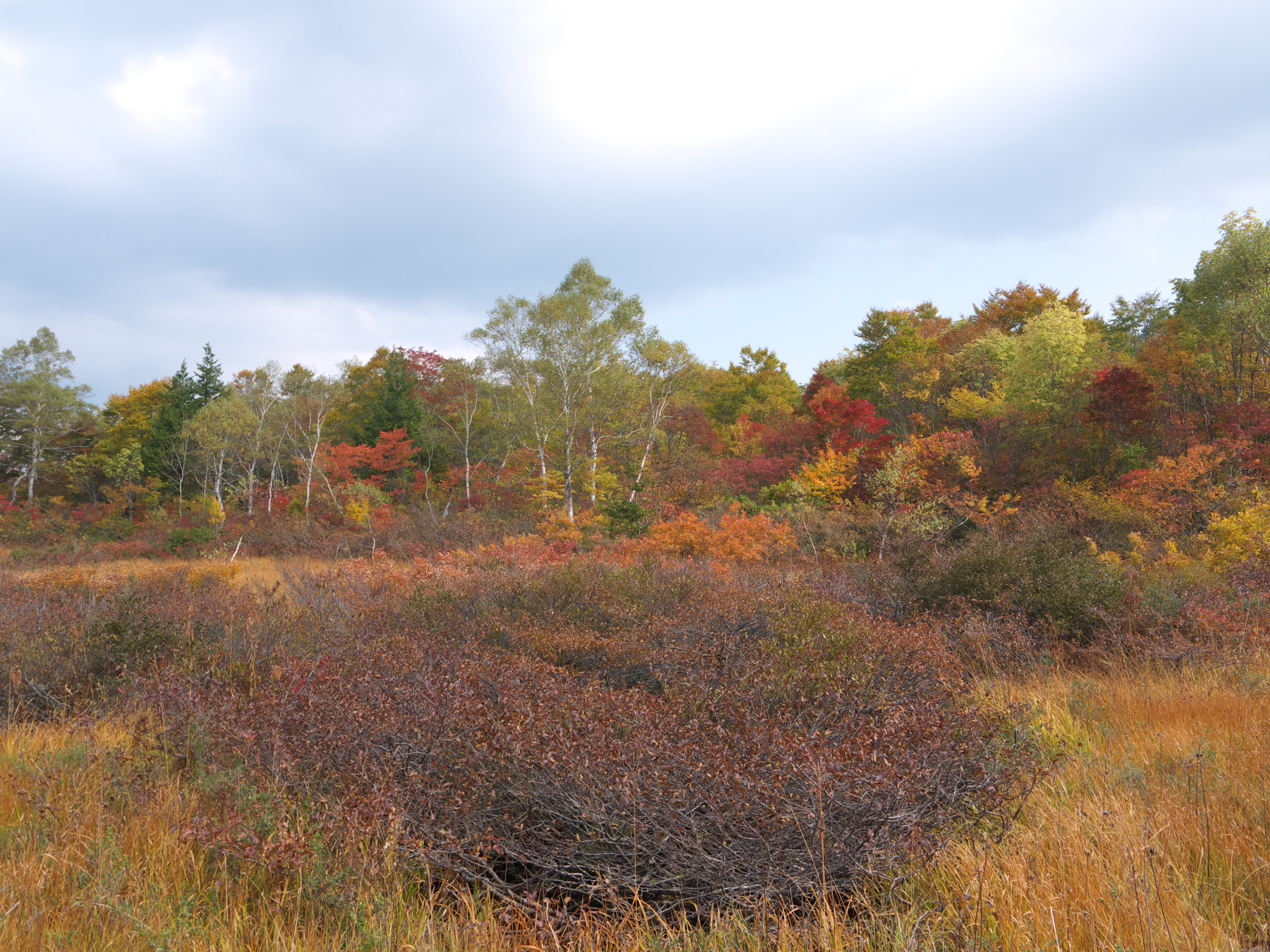
- Komado wetlands in Shōwa, Fukushima

- Flag Seal

- Location of Shōwa in Fukushima Prefecture

- Coordinates: 37°20′7.6″N 139°36′38.3″E
- Country: Japan
- Region: Tōhoku
- Prefecture: Fukushima
- District: Ōnuma

Area
  - Total: 209.46 km^{2} (80.87 sq mi)

Population (April 2020)
  - Total: 1,236
  - Density: 5.901/km^{2} (15.28/sq mi)
- Time zone: UTC+9 (Japan Standard Time)
- Phone number: 0241-57-2114
- Address: 350 Shimo-Nakatsugawa Sumiyoshi 415, Shōwa-mura, Ōnuma-gun, Fukushima-ken 968-0103
- Website: Official website

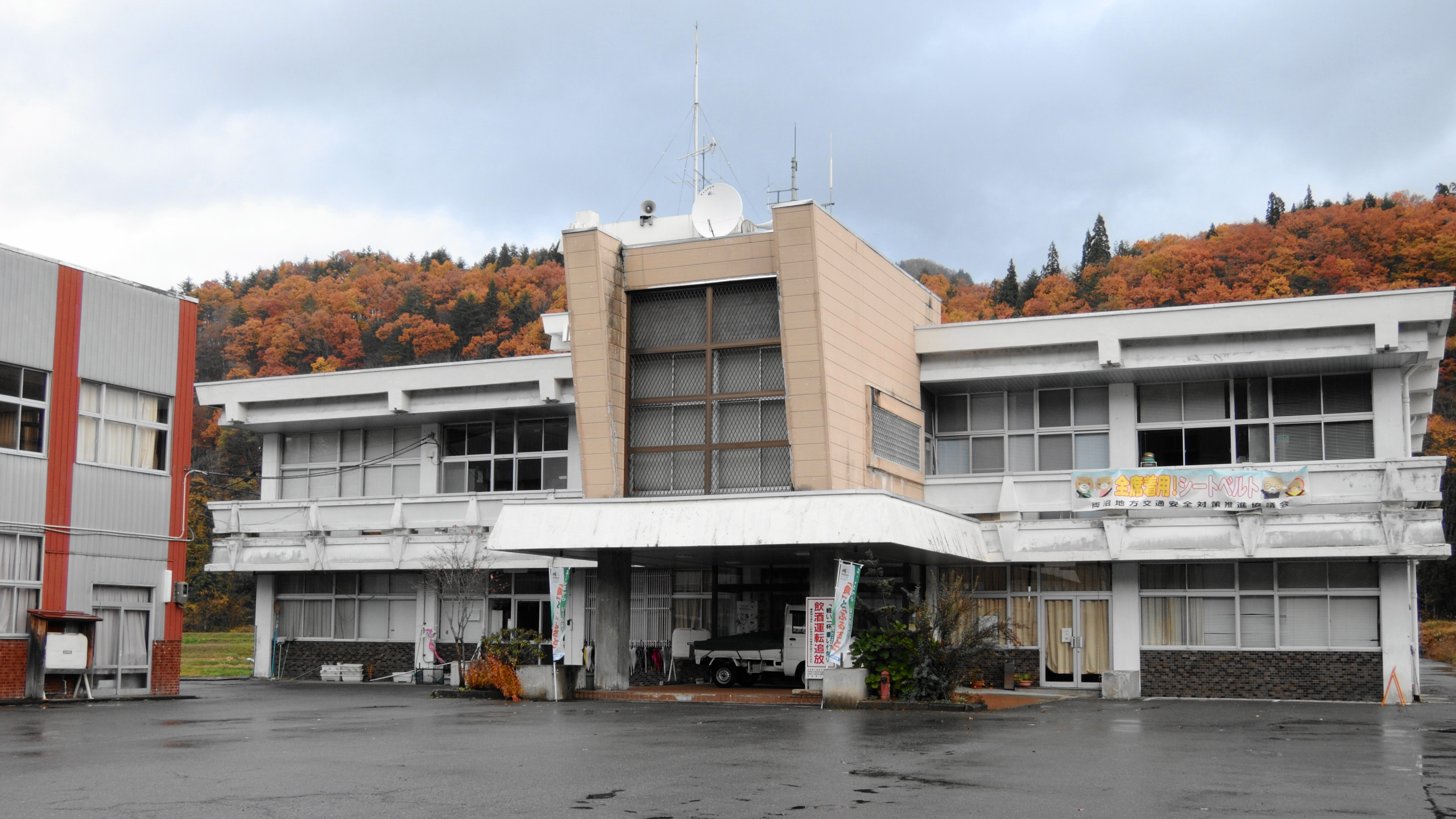
Shōwa Village Hall

Shōwa (昭和村, Shōwa-mura) is a village located in Fukushima Prefecture, Japan. As of 1 April 2020, the village had an estimated population of 1,236 in 658 households, and a population density of 5.9 persons per km^{2}. The total area of the village was 209.46 square kilometres (80.87 sq mi).

== Geography ==
Shōwa is located in the western portion of the Aizu region of Fukushima Prefecture, and consists of scattered hamlets along the Nojiri River.

- Mountains: Mount Hakase
- Rivers: Nojiri River

=== Neighboring municipalities ===
- Fukushima Prefecture
  - Aizumisato
  - Kaneyama
  - Minamiaizu
  - Mishima
  - Shimogō
  - Tadami
  - Yanaizu

=== Climate ===
Shōwa has a humid continental climate (Köppen Dfb) characterized by warm summers and cold winters with heavy snowfall. The average annual temperature in Shōwa is 9.1 °C. The average annual rainfall is 1615 mm with September as the wettest month. The temperatures are highest on average in August, at around 22.4 °C, and lowest in January, at around -3.3 °C.

== Demographics ==
Per Japanese census data, the population of Shōwa has declined steadily over the past 60 years.

Historical population
Year	Pop.	±%
1920	3,408	—
1930	3,717	+9.1%
1940	4,075	+9.6%
1950	4,684	+14.9%
1960	4,658	−0.6%
1970	3,604	−22.6%
1980	2,629	−27.1%
1990	2,167	−17.6%
2000	1,874	−13.5%
2010	1,500	−20.0%
2020	1,246	−16.9%

== History ==
The area of present-day Shōwa was part of ancient Mutsu Province and formed part of the holdings of Aizu Domain during the Edo period. After the Meiji Restoration, it was organized as part of Ōnuma District within Fukushima Prefecture. The villages of Nojiri and Oashi were created with the establishment of the modern municipalities system on April 1, 1889. The two villages merged on November 23, 1927, to form the village of Shōwa.

== Economy ==
The economy is dominated by agriculture, with the cultivation of Ramie being a notable product.

== Education ==
Shōwa has one public elementary school and one public junior high school operated by the village government. The village does not have a high school.

- Shōwa Middle School
- Shōwa Elementary School

== Transportation ==
=== Railway ===
The village does not have any passenger rail services.

=== Highway ===
- National Route 400
- National Route 401

== Local attractions ==
- Komado wetlands
