= Hayato Station (Fukushima) =

Railway station in Mishima, Fukushima Prefecture, Japan

Hayato Station 早戸駅
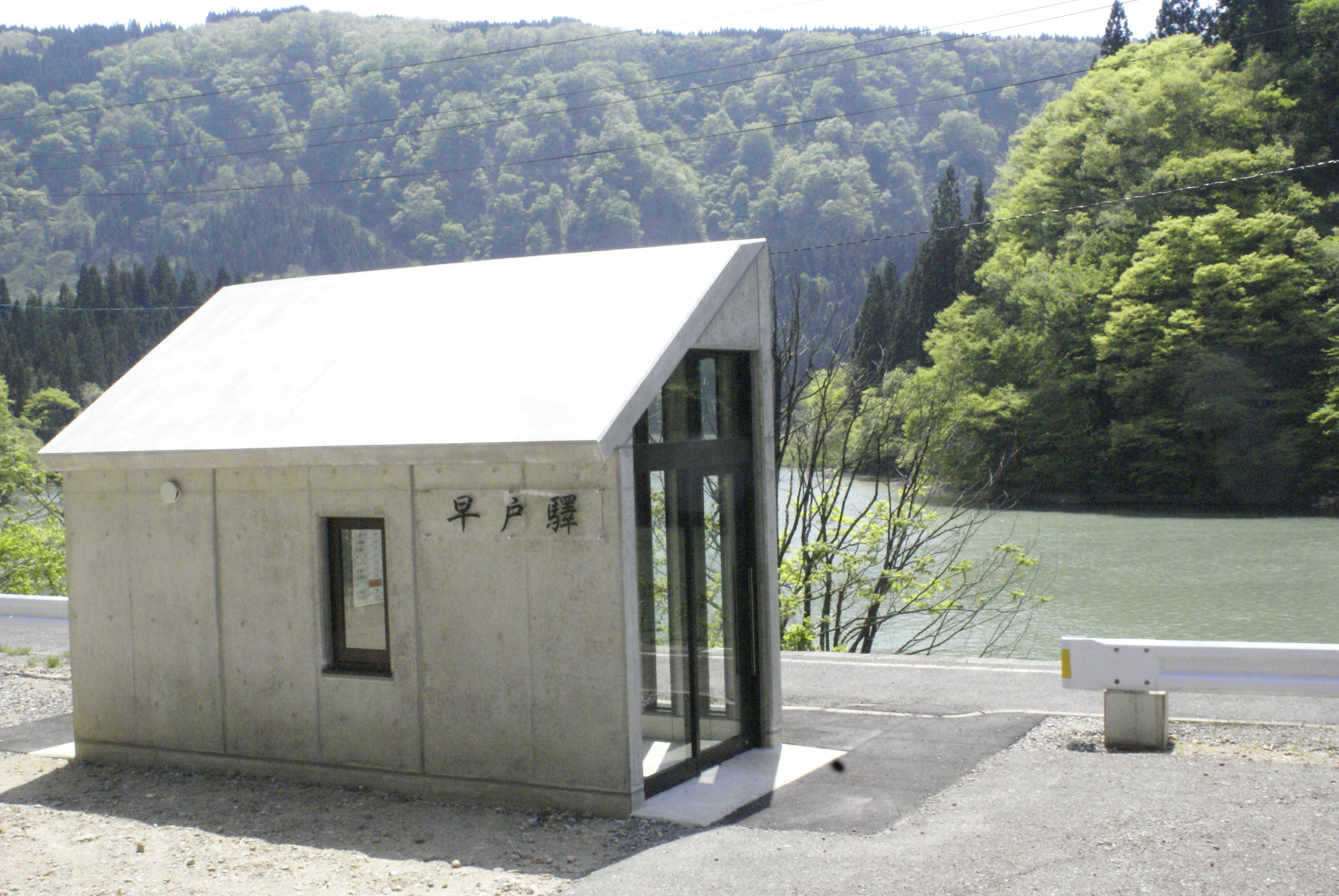
- Hayato Station in June 2008

General information
- Location: Hayato, Mishima-machi, Ōnuma-gun, Fukushima-ken 969-7406; Japan
- Coordinates: 37.4697°N 139.5937°E
- Operator: JR East
- Line: ■ Tadami Line
- Distance: 51.2 km from Aizu-Wakamatsu
- Platforms: 1 side platform
- Tracks: 2

Other information
- Status: Unstaffed
- Website: Official website

History
- Opened: September 20, 1956

Services
Preceding station	JR East	Following station
Aizu-Mizunuma towards Koide	Tadami Line	Aizu-Miyashita towards Aizu-Wakamatsu
Location
- Location within JR Tadami Line Location within Fukushima Prefecture Location within Japan

Hayato Station (早戸駅, Hayato-eki) is a railway station on the Tadami Line in the town of Mishima, Ōnuma District, Fukushima Prefecture, Japan, operated by East Japan Railway Company (JR East).

== Lines ==
Hayato Station is served by the Tadami Line, and is located 51.2 rail kilometers from the official starting point of the line at Aizu-Wakamatsu.

== Station layout ==
Hayato Station has one side platform serving a single bi-directional track. There is no station building, but only a concrete shelter on the platform. The station is unattended.

== History ==
Hayato Station opened on September 20, 1956, as an intermediate station on the extension of eastern section of the Japanese National Railways (JNR) Tadami Line between Aizu-Miyashita and Aizu-Kawaguchi. The station was absorbed into the JR East network upon the privatization of the JNR on April 1, 1987.

== Surrounding area ==
Hayato Station is located in an isolated rural location with no buildings nearby.

- National Route 252
- Tadami River
- Hayato Onsen

== In media ==
The 5th episode of the TV series "Tetsu Ota Michiko, 20,000 km" is dedicated to this station

== See also ==
- List of railway stations in Japan
