= Hayato Station =

Hayato Station is the name of two train stations in Japan:

- Hayato Station (Fukushima) (早戸駅)
- Hayato Station (Kagoshima) (隼人駅)
