= Akabeko =

Legendary cow from Japan, inspiring a toy

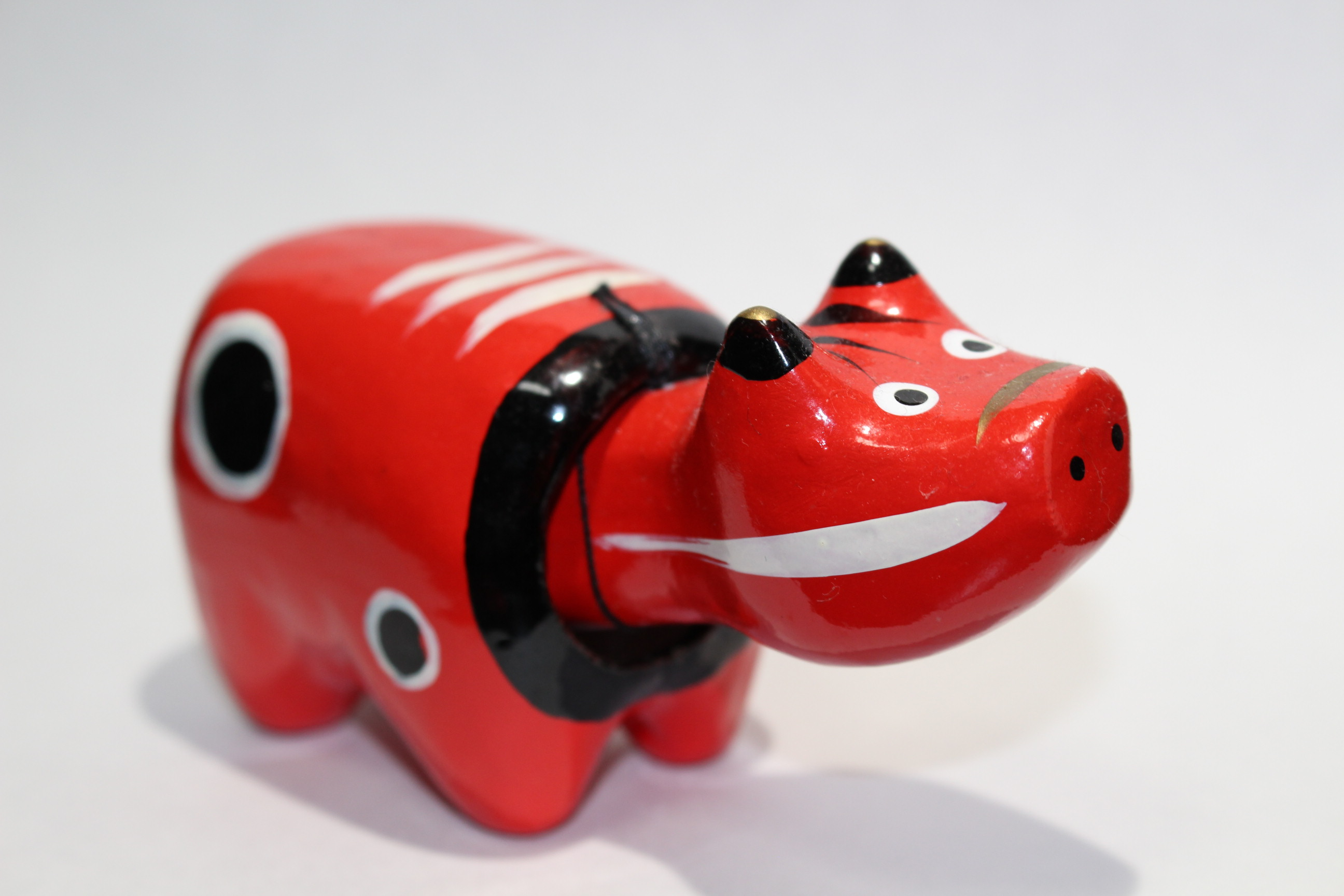
An Akabeko toy

Akabeko (赤べこ, Akabeko; red cow) is a legendary cow from the Aizu region of Japan who inspired a traditional toy. In legend, Akabeko was present at the building of the Enzō-ji temple of Yanaizu in the ninth century and became a permanent fixture there, with some stories saying the animal was turned to stone.

The Akabeko toy is made of two pieces of papier-mâché-covered wood, shaped and painted to look like a red cow or ox. One piece represents the cow's head and neck and the other its body. The head and neck hangs from a string and fits into the hollow body. When the toy is moved, the head bobs up and down and side to side. The earliest akabeko toys were created in the late 16th or early 17th century. Over time, people came to believe that the toys could ward off smallpox and other illnesses.

Akabeko has become one of Fukushima Prefecture's most famous crafts and a symbol of the Aizu region. It has also been recognized as a symbol of the larger Tōhoku region, of which Fukushima Prefecture is a part.

== Origin of the legend ==
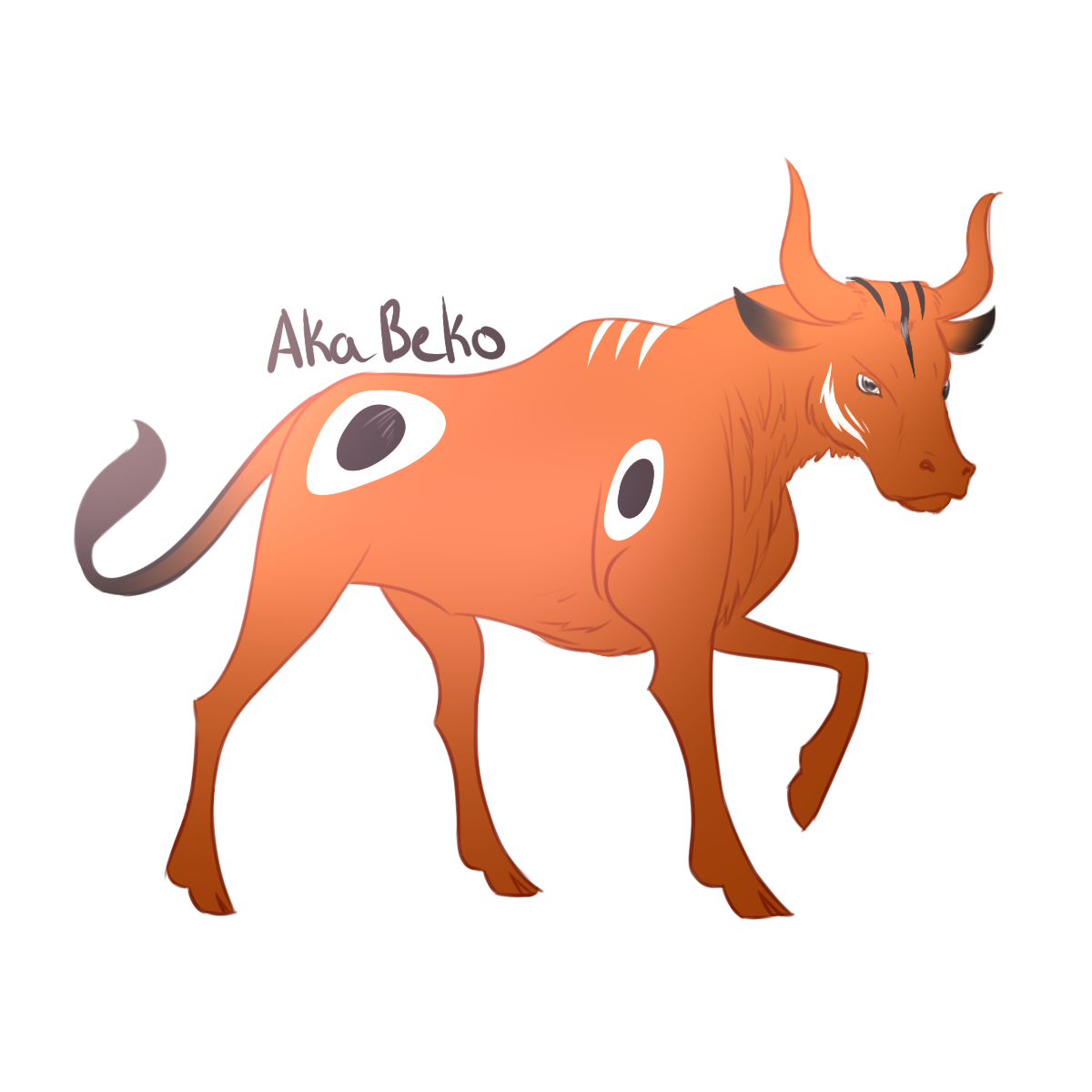
Artist rendition of the legendary Akabeko cow

According to an Aizu-area legend recorded by Thomas Madden, akabeko toys are based upon a real cow that lived in 807 CE. At that time, a monk named Tokuichi was supervising the construction of Enzō-ji, a temple in Yanaizu, Fukushima. Upon the temple's completion, the akabeko gave its spirit to a Buddha, and its flesh immediately turned to stone.

Another version of the tale claims that the cow instead refused to leave the temple grounds after construction had been completed and became a permanent fixture there. The red cow was called akabeko (赤べこ, akabeko; beko is Aizu dialect for cow) and became a symbol of zealous devotion to the Buddha.

After Toyotomi Hideyoshi had solidified his power over Japan, his representative, Gamō Ujisato, was sent to be the lord of the Aizu region in 1590. At his new post, Ujisato heard the story of akabeko and ordered his court artisans, who had accompanied him from Kyoto, to create a toy based on the red cow. These early papier-mâché akabeko introduced most of the basic elements for which the toy is known.

In the same period, Japan suffered a smallpox outbreak. People in Aizu noticed that children who owned akabeko toys did not seem to catch the illness. The akabeko's red colour may have enhanced this association, since red amulets are thought to protect against that illness. Akabeko toys became very popular as charms to ward off sickness, a superstition that persists in modern times. The toy has since become one of the few crafts from Fukushima Prefecture to be known all over Japan and a symbol of the Aizu area.

== Production ==
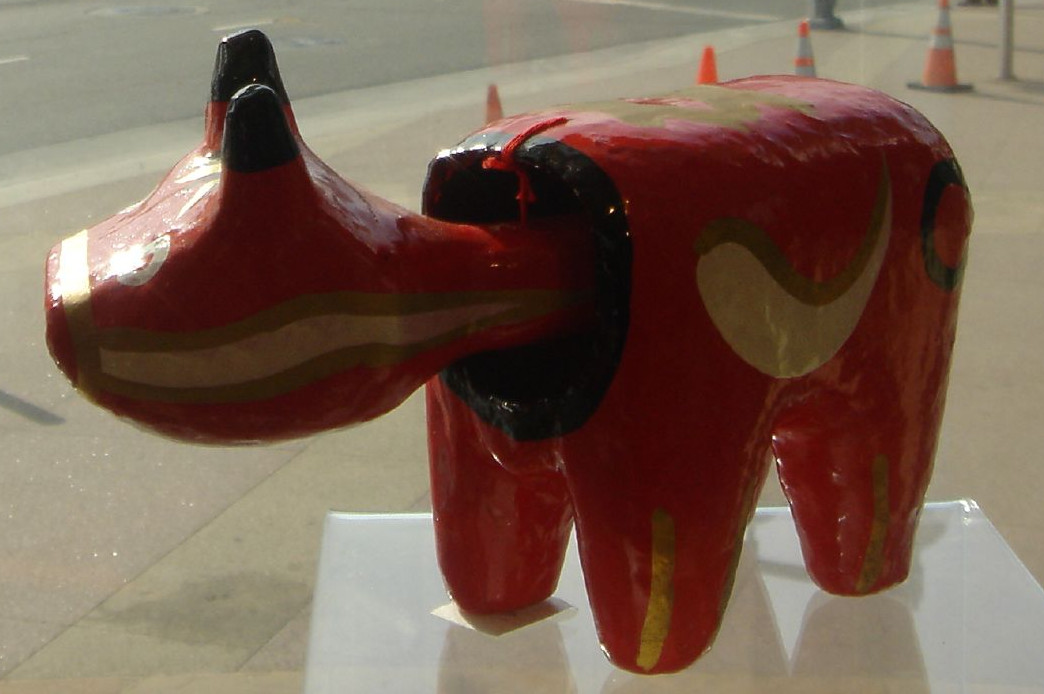
Akabeko at the Japanese American National Museum

Akabeko are made from papier-mâché that is painted and lacquered. The toy consists of two main pieces: the body, and the head and neck. The body is hollow and open on one end. The neck and head fit into this opening, suspended from a piece of string. Whenever the akabeko is moved or jostled, its head bobs up and down and side to side.

Akabeko are made by fewer than a dozen family-run workshops, whose members have passed down the technique for generations. The process takes about 10 days to complete. The artisan begins by wrapping wetted washi (Japanese paper) around two blocks of wood, one shaped like the cow's body, the other shaped like the head and neck. These blocks have often been used for several generations. Once the paper dries, the artisan splits it in two lengthwise and removes the wooden blocks. The craftsperson then rejoins the pieces of molded paper by wrapping more layers of washi around them.

The artisan paints the toy, beginning with black, then adding the characteristic red, and finally the white eyes and other details. The akabeko's markings vary from workshop to workshop. For example, the Igarashi family paints the Chinese character kotobuki (寿 longevity and luck) on the cow's back and a sun and moon on its side; other workshops add gold markings. The artisan finishes the toy with a thin coat of lacquer.

== See also ==
- Aizuhongō ware
- Gamō Ujisato, daimyō of the Sengoku and Azuchi–Momoyama periods
- Okiagari-koboshi
- Red heifer, a red cow of a different tradition
