= Aizuhongō ware =

Type of Japanese pottery

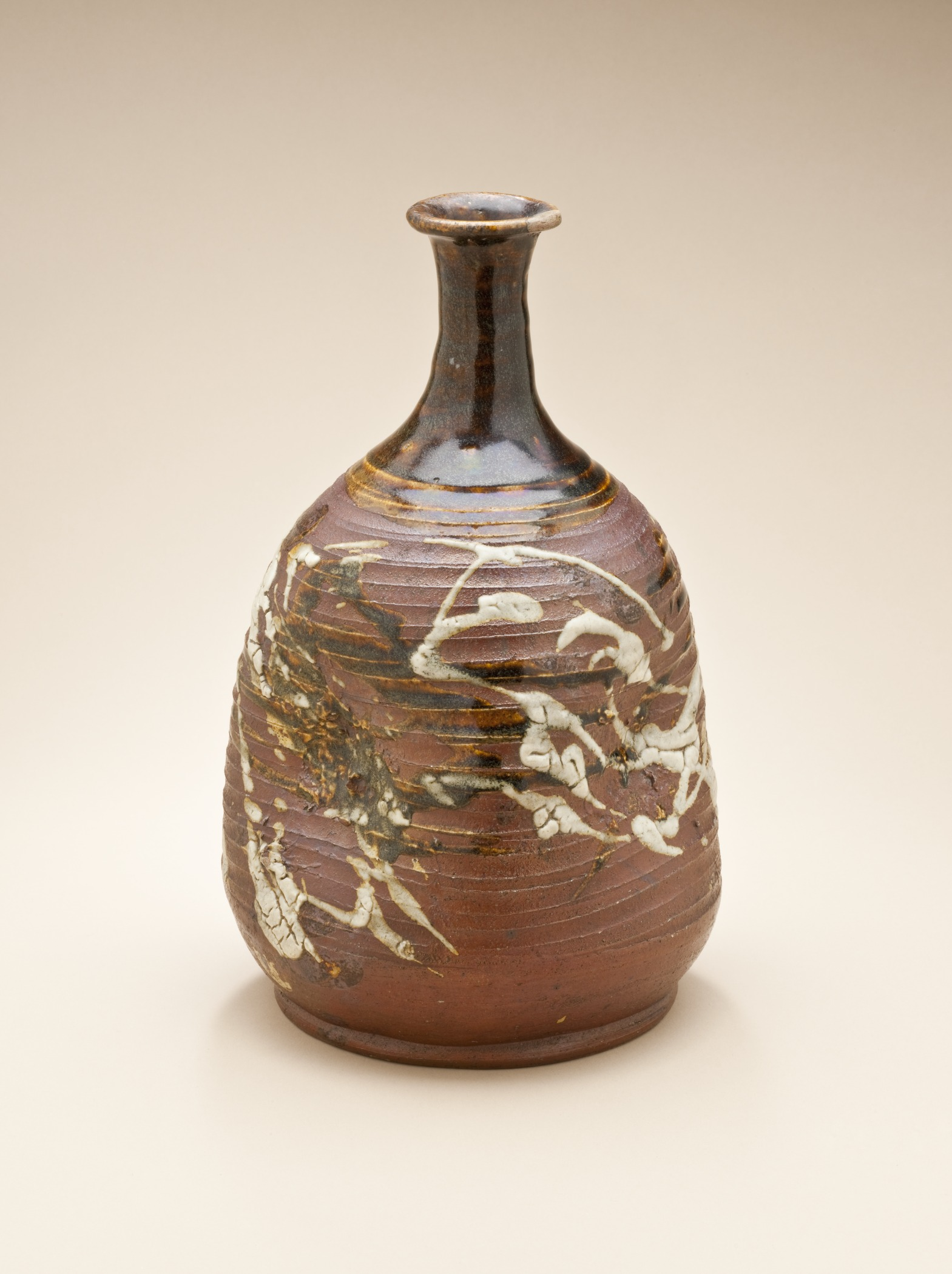
Aizuhongō ware sake bottle (tokkuri), Edo period, mid-19th century

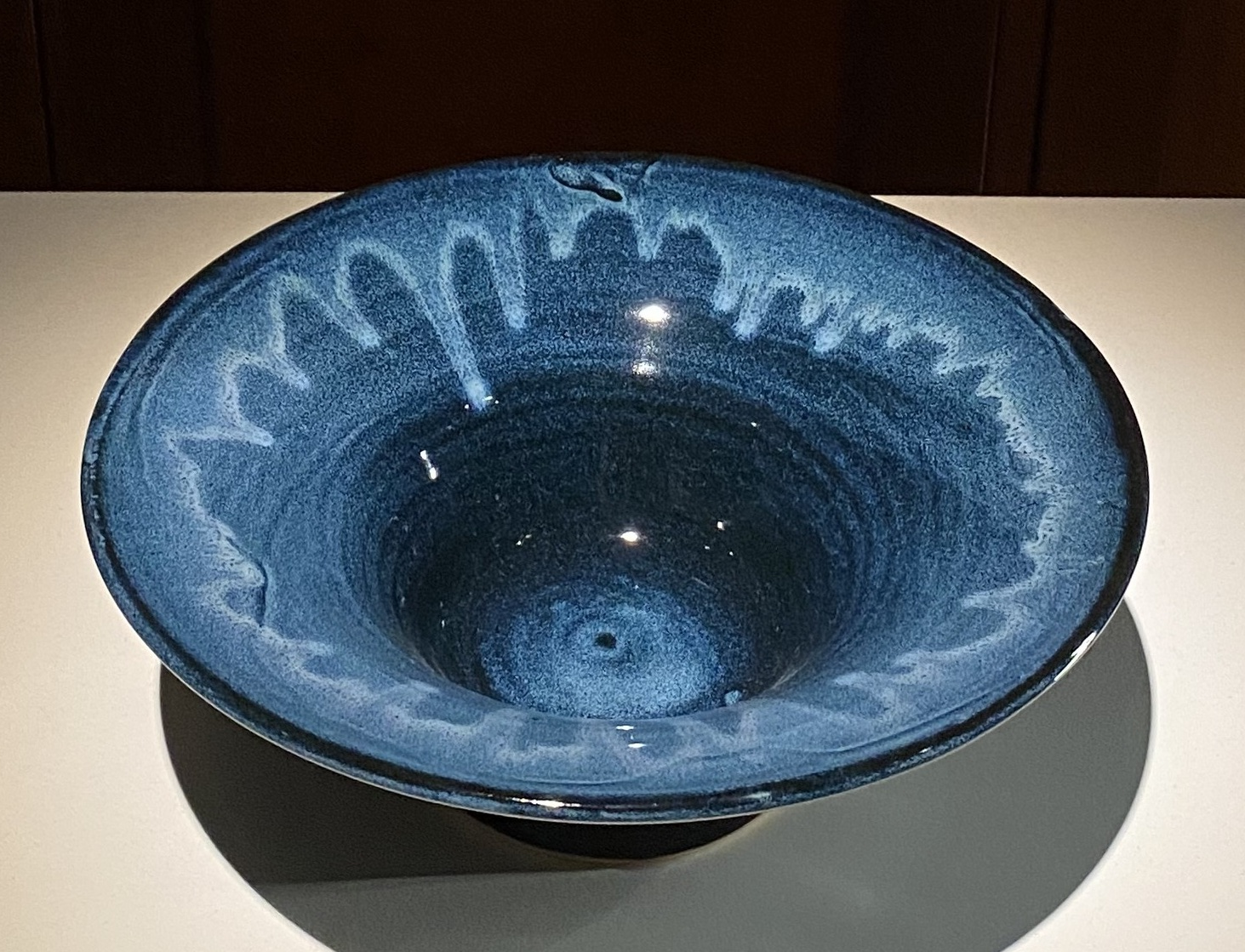
Aizuhongō ware ceramic bowl, Prince Consort Gallery, Victoria and Albert museum, London (2024)

Aizuhongō ware (会津本郷焼, Aizuhongō-yaki) is a type of Japanese pottery traditionally from Fukushima Prefecture. The Aizu-Hongo ware consists of a wide range of decorative styles with the use of asbolite, Japanese traditional paints, as well as other paints originating from the West. Hence, the diversity entailed within Aizu-Hongo ware originates from the progression of independent pottery production due to the termination of the magistrate's office. This led to the independent pottery operations to produce different unique styles of the Aizu-Hongo ware. In modern times, Aizu-Hongo wares have been recognized for its practicalities to create various different products ranging from tea cups to sake bottles.

== History ==
The origins date back to 1593 under Gamō Ujisato, lord of Aizuwakamatsu Castle. Consequently, the production of Aizuhongo Wares originated during the Sengoku period and flourished during the early years of the Edo period (1600–1868) under the Aizu clan led by Hoshina Masayuki. Under his command, potters were relocated from Owari to Aizu in order to begin full production. This ultimately led to everyday pottery being accessible for the common people in Japan. However, the production came to a halt during the Boshin War where porcelain factories had been burned down and potters were inactive due to fighting in the war. Nevertheless, the production of Aizu-Hongo ware had been able to overcome these difficulties with the aid of all the villages' united production of activities in Japan to recover the ancient pottery crafts. The continuation of the Aizu-Hongo ware industry eventually led to the export of the ancient Japanese potteries to the United States beginning from the early 19th century and continues to prosper to date.

== Contemporary practice ==
An annual Aizuhongō pottery market festival (会津本郷せと市) is held first Sunday of every August.

== Production Process ==
1. The clay that is used to make an Aizuhongō ware requires at least one year of rain and wind exposure.
2. After being exposed, the clay is then broken up and kneaded while adding water.
3. The clay is modified to the desired shape by using a lathe. Once the potter is content with the shape, the lathe is stopped and the edges are smoothed out with leather.
4. The clay is then dried either by natural or heated drying. Shortly afterwards, the designs may be applied directly on the craft or after bisque firing before it is coated with glaze.
5. Once this is complete, the clay pieces are baked and must be completely cooled inside the kiln to prevent any breakage. The time period differs depending on the requirements for each piece.
6. The finished pottery products are given a final inspection to identify any breakage or defects.

== See also ==
- Aizumisato
- Akabeko
- List of Traditional Crafts of Japan
