= Kaneyama, Fukushima =

Kaneyama 金山町
- Town
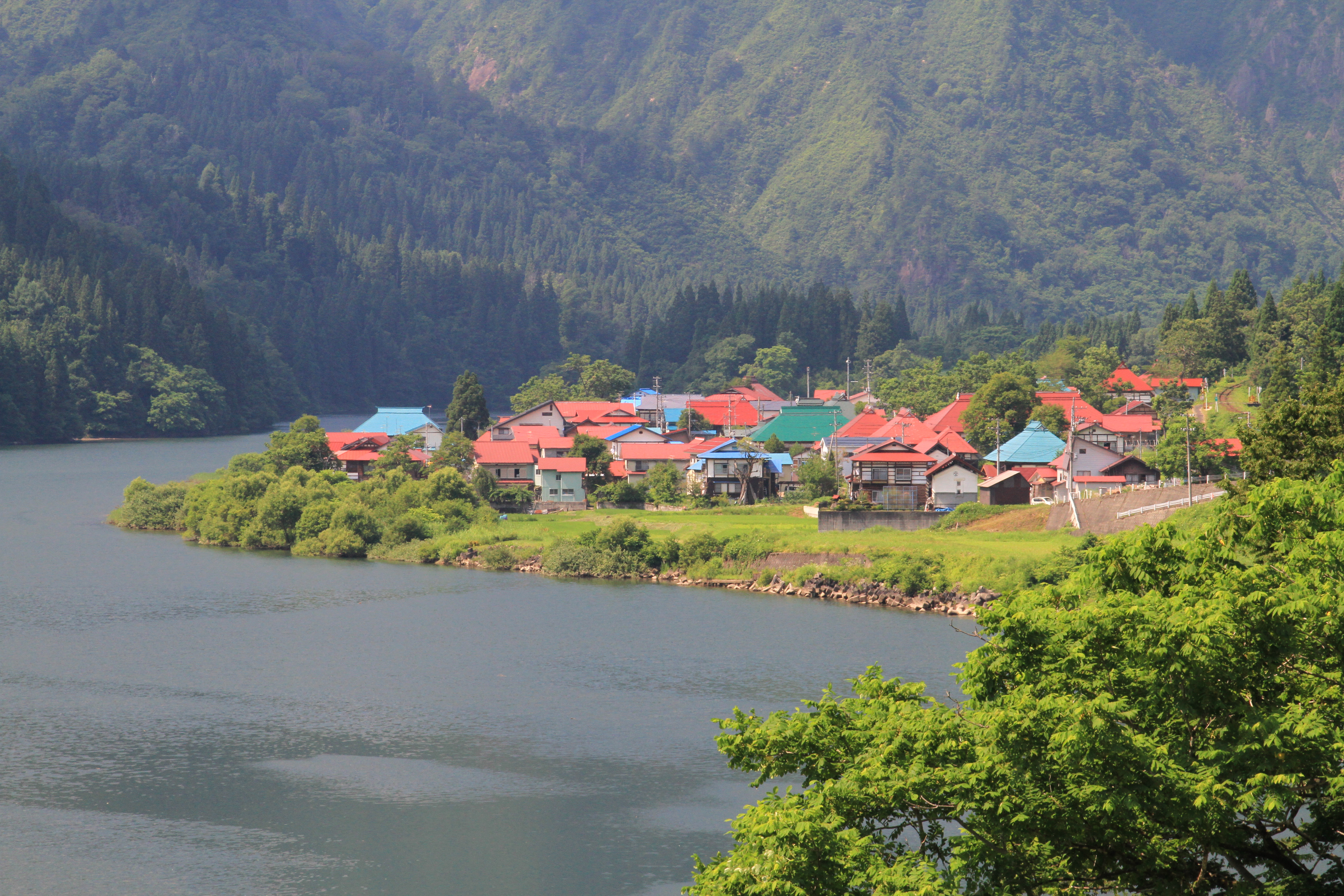
- Tadami River and Oshi district

- Flag Seal

- Location of Kaneyama in Fukushima Prefecture

- Coordinates: 37°27′13.3″N 139°32′28.7″E
- Country: Japan
- Region: Tōhoku
- Prefecture: Fukushima
- District: Ōnuma

Area
  - Total: 293.92 km^{2} (113.48 sq mi)

Population (March 2020)
  - Total: 1,972
  - Density: 6.709/km^{2} (17.38/sq mi)
- Time zone: UTC+9 (Japan Standard Time)
- Phone number: 0241-45-2211
- Address: 393 Yachi Kawaguchi Kaneyama-machi, Ōnuma-gun, Fukushima-ken 968-0011
- Climate: Cfa/Dfa
- Website: Official website
- Symbols
- Bird: Common cuckoo
- Flower: Magnolia kobus
- Tree: Paulownia tomentosa

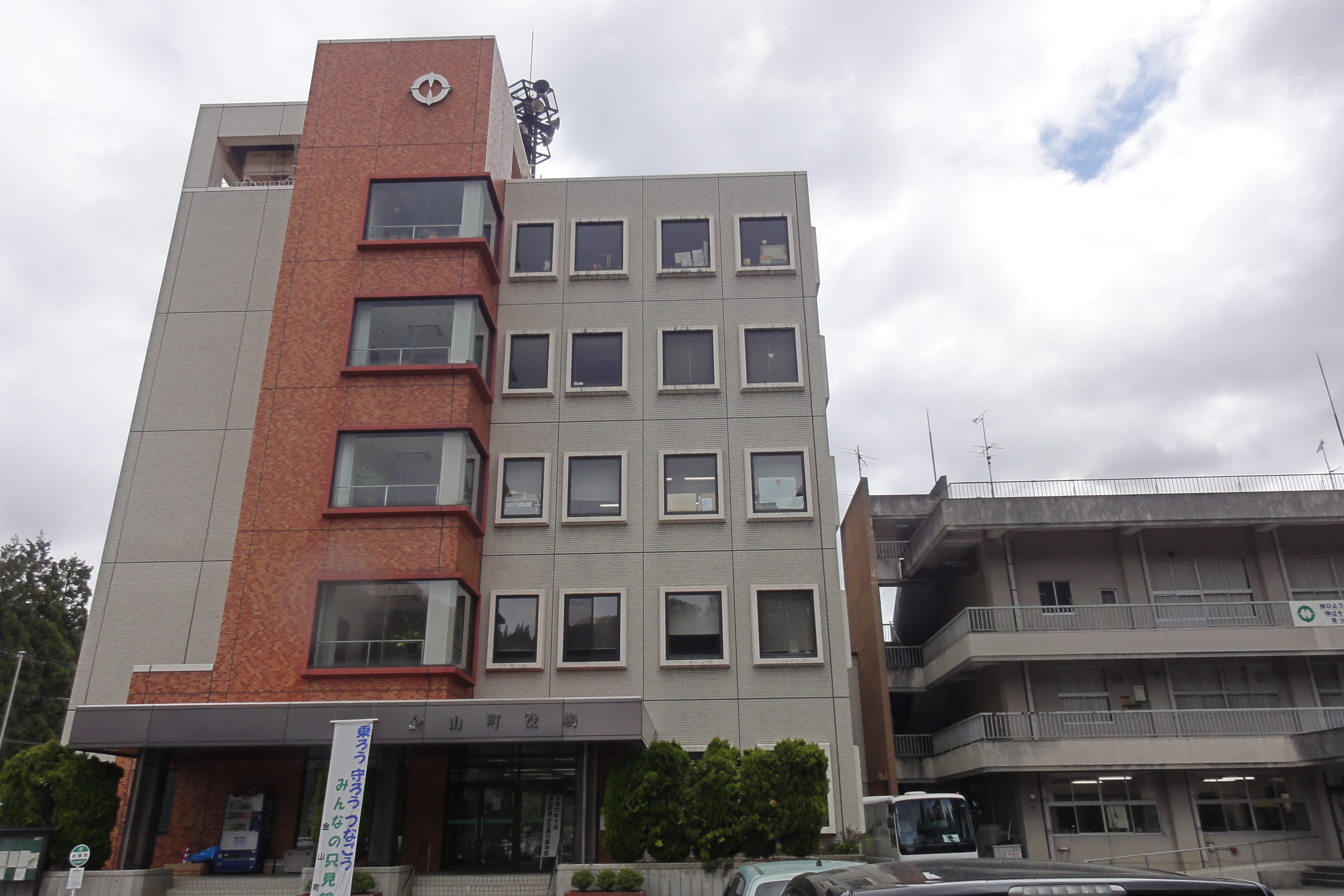
Kaneyama Town Hall

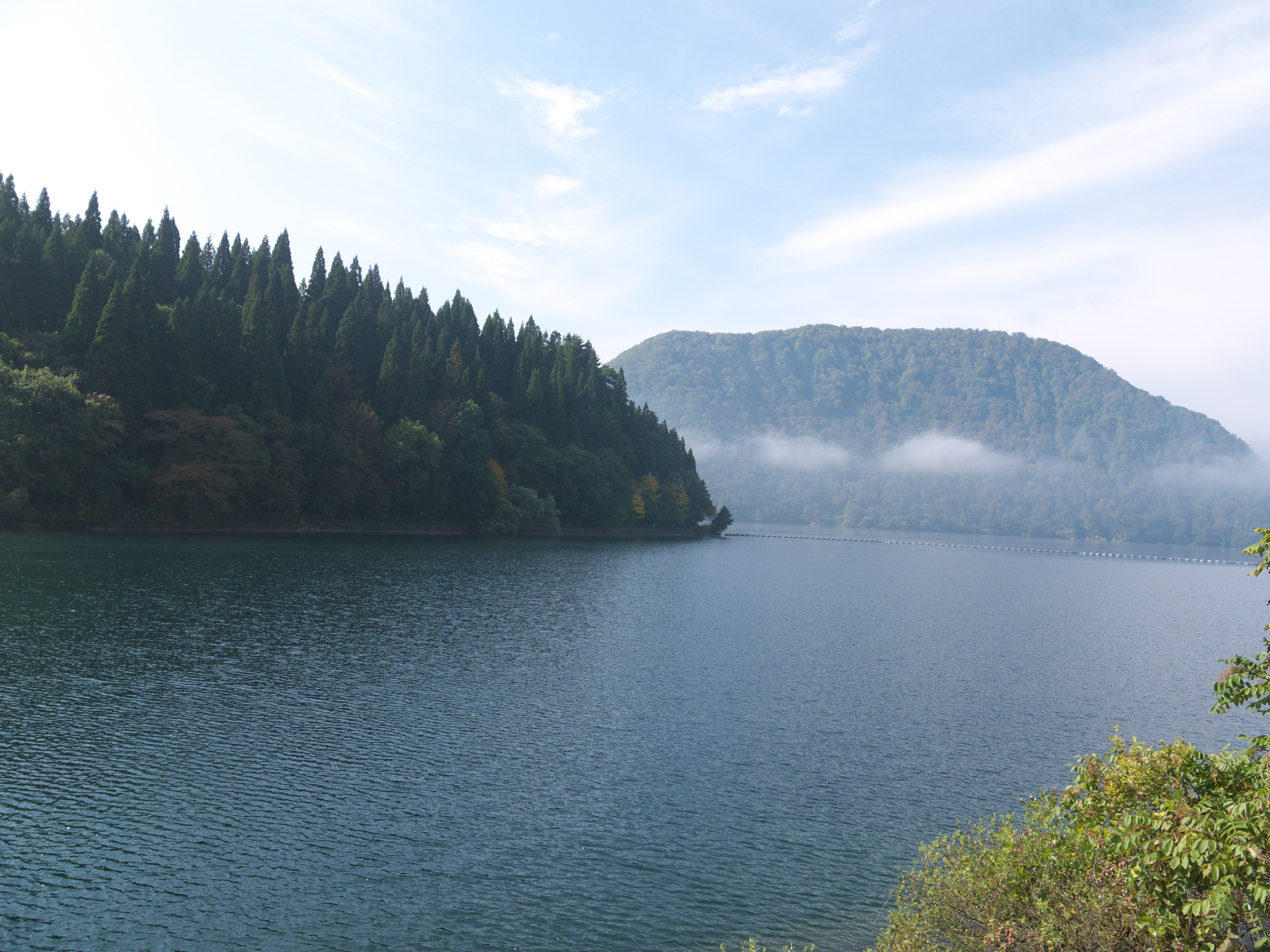
Lake Numazawa

Kaneyama (金山町, Kaneyama-machi) is a town located in Fukushima Prefecture, Japan. As of 1 March 2020, the town had an estimated population of 1972, in 1037 households and a population density of 6.7 persons per km^{2}. The total area is 293.92 square kilometres (113.48 sq mi). Kaneyama is noted for its spectacular scenery.

== Geography ==
Kaneyama is located in mountainous northwest of the Aizu region of Fukushima Prefecture, bordered Niigata Prefecture to the west. Kaneyama has no town center, but is an artificial construct made up of a number of small villages scattered alongside the Tadami River. Kaneyama has many hot springs.

- Mountains : Mount Mikagura (1386.5 m), Mount Takamori
- Rivers : Tadami River
- Lakes: Lake Numazawa

=== Climate ===
Kaneyama has a humid continental climate (Köppen Dfa) characterized by warm summers and cold winters with heavy snowfall. The average annual temperature in Kaneyama is 9.1 °C. The average annual rainfall is 1615 mm with September as the wettest month. The temperatures are highest on average in August, at around 23.5 °C, and lowest in January, at around -2.6 °C.

Climate data for Kaneyama, Fukushima (2008−2020 normals, extremes 2008−present)
Month	Jan	Feb	Mar	Apr	May	Jun	Jul	Aug	Sep	Oct	Nov	Dec	Year
Record high °C (°F)	12.7 (54.9)	15.1 (59.2)	19.4 (66.9)	27.6 (81.7)	32.5 (90.5)	33.8 (92.8)	35.1 (95.2)	35.5 (95.9)	34.4 (93.9)	29.5 (85.1)	22.2 (72.0)	15.6 (60.1)	35.5 (95.9)
Mean daily maximum °C (°F)	2.0 (35.6)	3.1 (37.6)	7.4 (45.3)	14.4 (57.9)	21.8 (71.2)	24.8 (76.6)	28.0 (82.4)	29.5 (85.1)	24.8 (76.6)	18.3 (64.9)	11.3 (52.3)	4.7 (40.5)	15.8 (60.5)
Daily mean °C (°F)	−1.0 (30.2)	−0.8 (30.6)	2.1 (35.8)	7.3 (45.1)	14.3 (57.7)	18.5 (65.3)	22.6 (72.7)	23.6 (74.5)	19.2 (66.6)	12.9 (55.2)	6.5 (43.7)	1.3 (34.3)	10.5 (51.0)
Mean daily minimum °C (°F)	−3.4 (25.9)	−3.8 (25.2)	−1.6 (29.1)	1.8 (35.2)	8.0 (46.4)	13.6 (56.5)	18.9 (66.0)	19.8 (67.6)	15.7 (60.3)	9.5 (49.1)	3.4 (38.1)	−1.0 (30.2)	6.7 (44.1)
Record low °C (°F)	−12.2 (10.0)	−11.9 (10.6)	−9.7 (14.5)	−4.1 (24.6)	−0.2 (31.6)	5.6 (42.1)	10.9 (51.6)	12.7 (54.9)	8.2 (46.8)	2.3 (36.1)	−2.6 (27.3)	−10.5 (13.1)	−12.2 (10.0)
Average precipitation mm (inches)	224.9 (8.85)	137.1 (5.40)	116.1 (4.57)	98.0 (3.86)	77.2 (3.04)	127.4 (5.02)	294.1 (11.58)	182.7 (7.19)	150.8 (5.94)	142.0 (5.59)	171.6 (6.76)	248.5 (9.78)	1,983.2 (78.08)
Average snowfall cm (inches)	324 (128)	242 (95)	155 (61)	48 (19)	0 (0)	0 (0)	0 (0)	0 (0)	0 (0)	0 (0)	7 (2.8)	203 (80)	975 (384)
Average rainy days (≥ 1.0 mm)	23.6	17.4	17.0	12.8	10.3	11.8	15.9	13.1	11.8	13.2	17.4	21.9	186.2
Average snowy days (≥ 3 cm)	24.6	20.0	16.9	7.7	0	0	0	0	0	0	0.6	12.8	82.6
Mean monthly sunshine hours	39.3	64.5	117.8	162.5	201.6	160.3	129.8	168.8	131.0	110.0	83.5	52.8	1,422.1
Source: Japan Meteorological Agency

=== Neighboring municipalities ===
- Fukushima Prefecture
  - Mishima
  - Nishiaizu
  - Shōwa
  - Tadami
  - Yanaizu
- Niigata Prefecture
  - Aga

== Demographics ==
Per Japanese census data, the population of Kaneyama peaked in the 1950s and has declined steadily over the past 60 years. It is now roughly a quarter of what it was a century ago.

Historical population
Year	Pop.	±%
1920	6,817	—
1930	7,293	+7.0%
1940	7,945	+8.9%
1950	9,157	+15.3%
1960	10,119	+10.5%
1970	6,511	−35.7%
1980	4,790	−26.4%
1990	3,549	−25.9%
2000	3,204	−9.7%
2010	2,462	−23.2%
2020	1,862	−24.4%

== History ==
The area of present-day Kaneyama was part of ancient Mutsu Province and formed part of the holdings of Aizu Domain during the Edo period. After the Meiji Restoration, it was organized as part of Ōnuma District in Fukushima Prefecture. After the Meiji restoration, the villages of Yokota, Kawaguchi, Numazawa and Honna were established with the creation of the modern municipalities system on April 1, 1889. These villages merged on July 1, 1955, to form the village of Kaneyama, which was raised to town status on March 31, 1958.

One of the hamlets in the town, Mifuke, on the banks of the Tadami River, was abandoned after being struck by a landslide in April 1964, and is now a ghost town only visited occasionally by tourists and former residents. The displaced people were integrated into the village of Amenuma across the river.

== Economy ==
Hydroelectric power generation from numerous dams on the Tadami River is the primary source of revenue for the town.

== Education ==
Kaneyama has two public elementary schools and one public junior high school operated by the town government. The town has one public high school operated by the Fukushima Prefectural Board of Education.

- Fukushima Prefectural Kawaguchi High School

== Transportation ==
=== Railway ===
JR East – Tadami Line

- Aizu-Mizunuma - Aizu-Nakagawa - Aizu-Kawaguchi - Honna - Aizu-Kosugawa - Aizu-Yokota - Aizu-Ōshio

=== Highway ===
- National Route 253
- National Route 400

== Local attractions ==
- Lake Numazawa
- Numazawa Onsen
- Oshio Onsen
