= Yanaizu Station =

Yanaizu Station (柳津駅) is the name of two Japanese railway stations.

1. JR East's station in Tome, Miyagi Prefecture on the Kesennuma Line. -- Yanaizu Station (Miyagi)
2. Nagoya Railroad's station in Yanaizu, Gifu Prefecture on the Takehana Line. -- Yanaizu Station (Gifu)

There is also a station called Aizu-Yanaizu:

1. JR East's station in Yanaizu, Fukushima Prefecture on the Tadami Line. -- Aizu-Yanaizu Station.
