= Aizu-Miyashita Station =

Railway station in Mishima, Fukushima Prefecture, Japan

Aizu-Miyashita Station 会津宮下駅
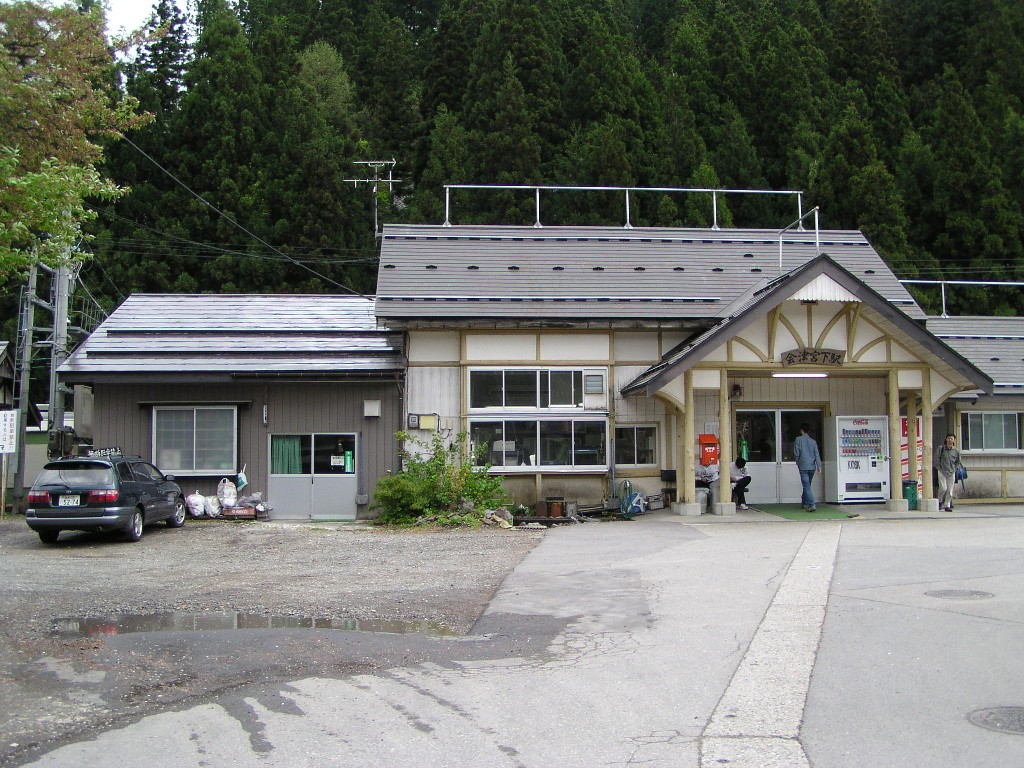
- Aizu-Miyashita Station in May 2005

General information
- Location: 1417 Miyashita Tanaka, Mishima-machi, Ōnuma-gun, Fukushima-ken 969-7511; Japan
- Coordinates: 37.4709°N 139.6469°E
- Operator: JR East
- Line: ■ Tadami Line
- Distance: 45.4 km from Aizu-Wakamatsu.
- Platforms: 2 side platforms
- Tracks: 2

Other information
- Status: Staffed
- Website: Official website

History
- Opened: 28 October 1941

Passengers
- FY2017: 41 daily

Services
Preceding station	JR East	Following station
Hayato towards Koide	Tadami Line	Aizu-Nishikata towards Aizu-Wakamatsu
Location
- Location within JR Tadami Line Location within Fukushima Prefecture Location within Japan

Aizu-Miyashita Station (会津宮下駅, Aizu-Miyashita-eki) is a railway station on the Tadami Line in the town of Mishima, Ōnuma District, Fukushima Prefecture, Japan, operated by the East Japan Railway Company (JR East).

== Lines ==
Aizu-Miyashita Station is served by the Tadami Line, and is located 45.4 kilometers from the official starting point of the line at Aizu-Wakamatsu.

== Station layout ==
Aizu-Miyashita Station has two opposed side platforms connected by a level crossing. The station is staffed.

=== Platforms ===
1	■ Tadami Line	for Aizu-Yanaizu, Aizu-Bange and Aizu-Wakamatsu
2	■ Tadami Line	for Aizuwakamatsu for Aizu-Kawaguchi and Tadami, Koide

== History ==
Aizu-Miyashita Station was opened on 28 October 1941, as the terminus of an extension of the eastern section of the Japanese National Railways (JNR) Tadami Line from the previous terminus at Aizu-Yanaizu. In 1956, the line was extended from Aizu-Miyashita to a new terminus at Aizu-Kawaguchi. The station was absorbed into the JR East network upon the privatization of the JNR on 1 April 1987.

== Passenger statistics ==
In fiscal 2017, the station was used by an average of 41 passengers daily (boarding passengers only).

== Surrounding area ==
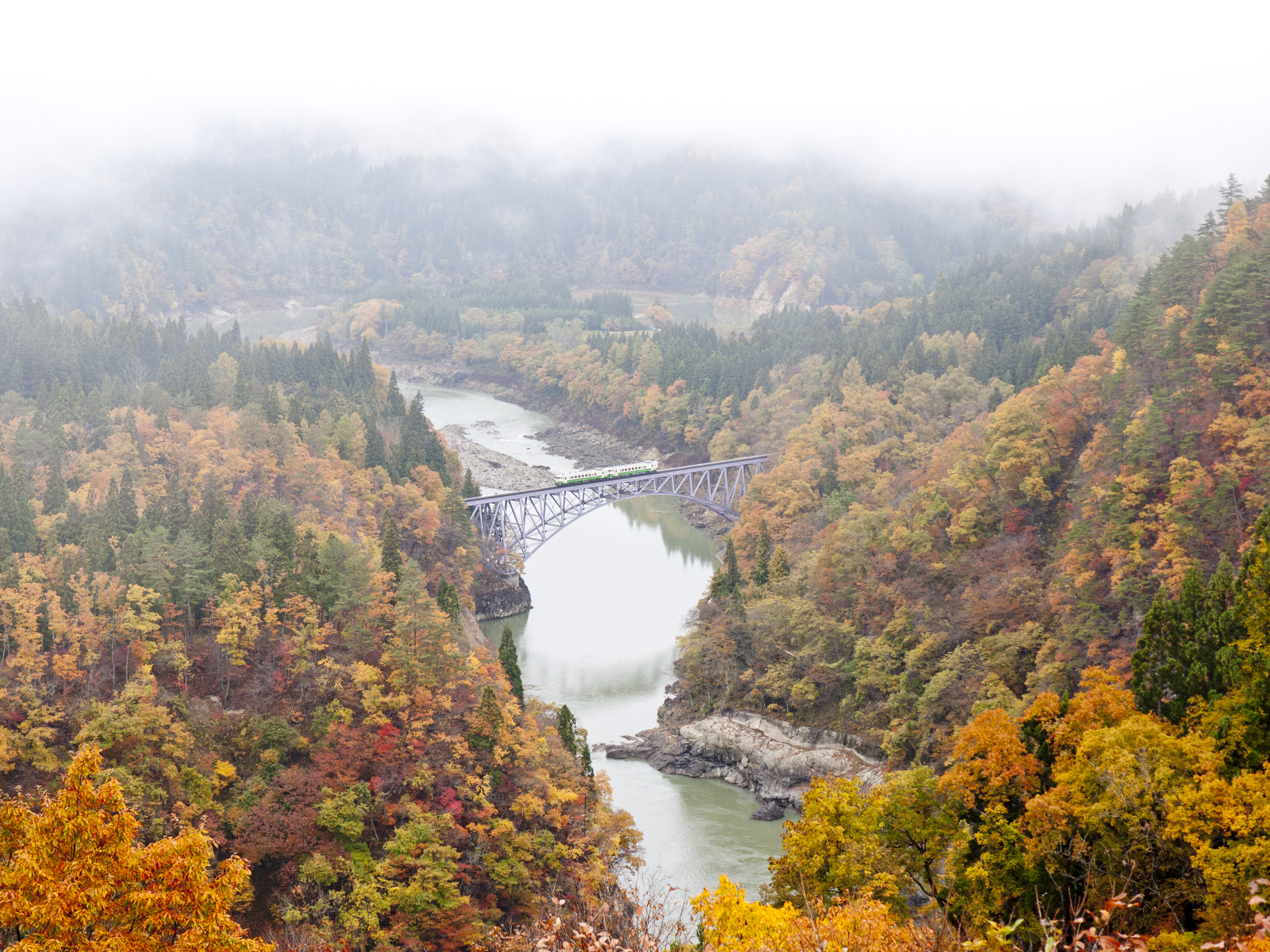
Tadamigawa Bridge No.1

- Mishima Town Hall
- Miyashita Post Office
- Tadami River bridge viewpoint
- National Route 252
- National Route 400

== See also ==
- List of railway stations in Japan
