= Aizu-Yanaizu Station =

Railway station in Yanaizu, Fukushima Prefecture, Japan

Aizu-Yanaizu Station 会津柳津駅
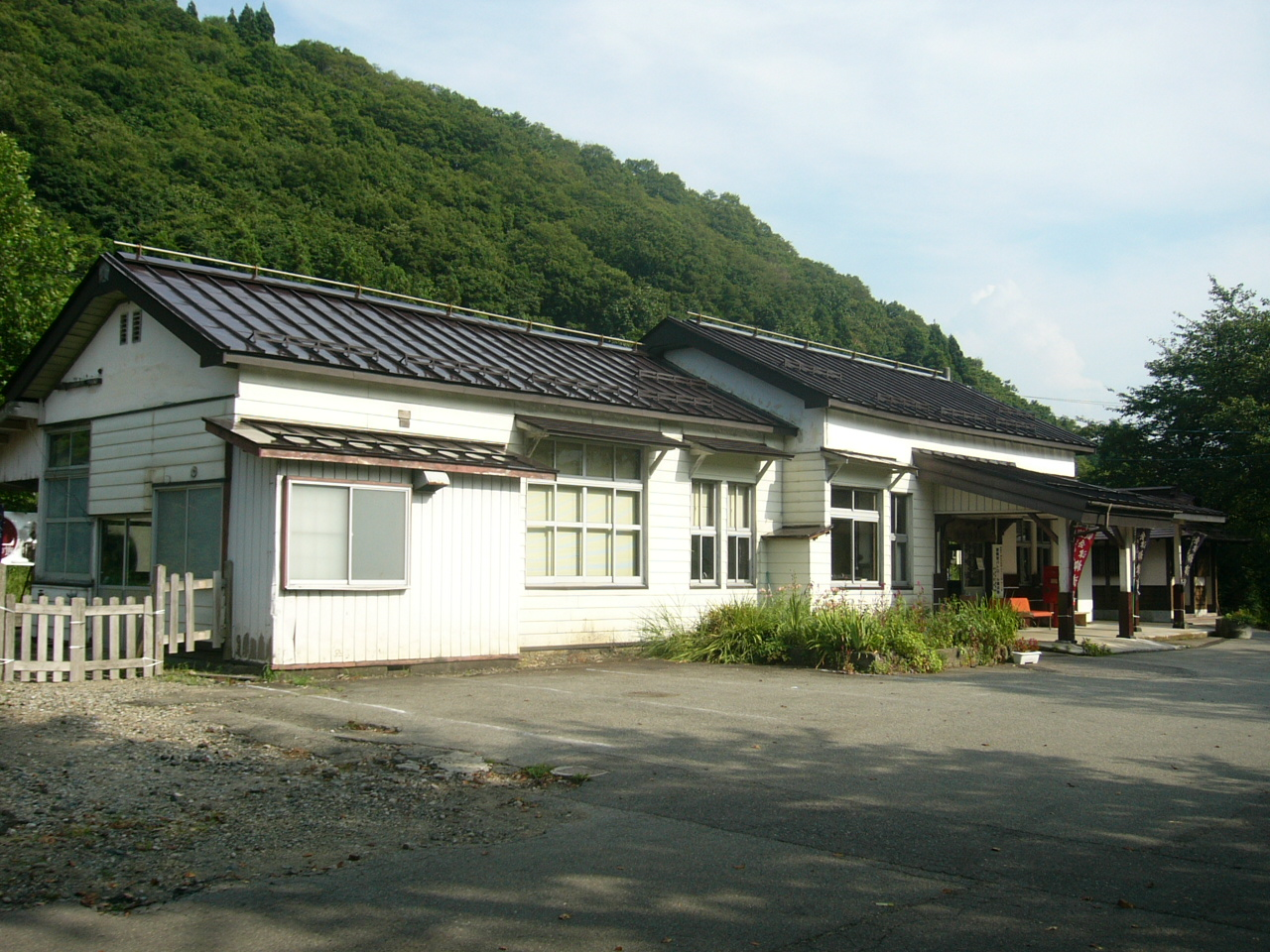
- Aizu-Yanaizu Station in August 2006

General information
- Location: Yanaizu Shimodaira 617, Yanaizu-machi, Kawanuma-gun, Fukushima-ken 969-7201; Japan
- Coordinates: 37.5385°N 139.7237°E
- Operator: JR East
- Line: ■ Tadami Line
- Distance: 33.3km from Aizu-Wakamatsu
- Platforms: 1 side platform
- Tracks: 1

Other information
- Status: Unstaffed
- Website: Official website

History
- Opened: November 20, 1928

Services
Preceding station	JR East	Following station
Gōdo towards Koide	Tadami Line	Aizu-Sakamoto towards Aizu-Wakamatsu
Location
- Location within JR Tadami Line Location within Fukushima Prefecture Location within Japan

Aizu-Yanaizu Station (会津柳津駅, Aizu-Yanaizu-eki) is a railway station on the Tadami Line in the town of Yanaizu, Fukushima Prefecture, Japan, operated by East Japan Railway Company (JR East).

== Lines ==
Aizu-Yanaizu Station is served by the Tadami Line, and is located 33.3 rail kilometers from the official starting point of the line at Aizu-Wakamatsu.

== Station layout ==
Aizu-Yanaizu Station has one side platform serving a single bi-directional track. The station is unattended.

== History ==
Aizu-Yanaizu Station opened on November 20, 1928, as the terminus of the initial eastern section of the Japanese National Railways (JNR) Tadami Line from Aizu-Wakamatsu. In 1941, the line was extended from Aizu-Yanaizu to a new terminus at Aizu-Miyashita. The station was absorbed into the JR East network upon the privatization of the JNR on April 1, 1987.

== Surrounding area ==
- Yanaizu Town Hall
- Yanaizu Post Office
- National Route 49

== See also ==
- List of railway stations in Japan
