= Japan National Route 400 =

Road in Japan

National Route 400
- 国道400号
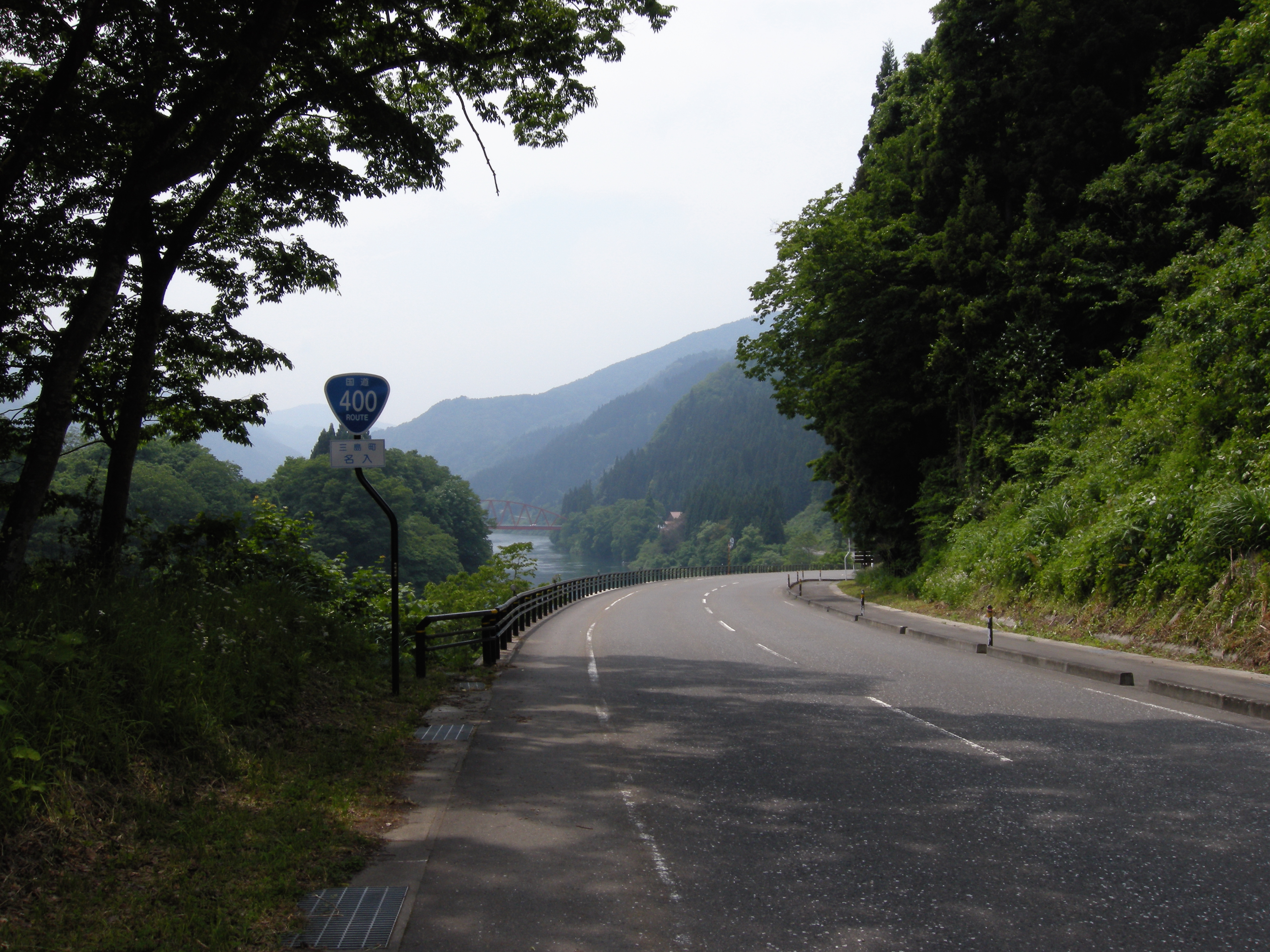

Route information
- Length: 225.7 km (140.2 mi)

Location
- Country: Japan

Highway system
- National highways of Japan; Expressways of Japan
← National Route 399	→ National Route 401

National Route 400 is a national highway of Japan connecting Mito, Ibaraki and Nishiaizu, Fukushima, with a total length of 225.7 km (140.24 mi).
