= Ōnuma District =

District in Fukushima Prefecture, Japan

Coordinates: 37.448°N 139.544°E

Location of Ōnuma District in Fukushima Prefecture

Ōnuma (大沼郡, Ōnuma-gun) is a district of Fukushima Prefecture, Japan.

As of 2008, the district has an estimated population of 29,787 and a density of 34.2 persons per km^{2}. Its total area is 870.51 square kilometres (336.11 mi^{2}).

It contains one village (Shōwa) and three towns: Aizumisato, Kaneyama, and Mishima.
