= Japan National Route 252 =

Road in Japan

National Route 252
- 国道252号
- Japan National Route 252 highlighted in red
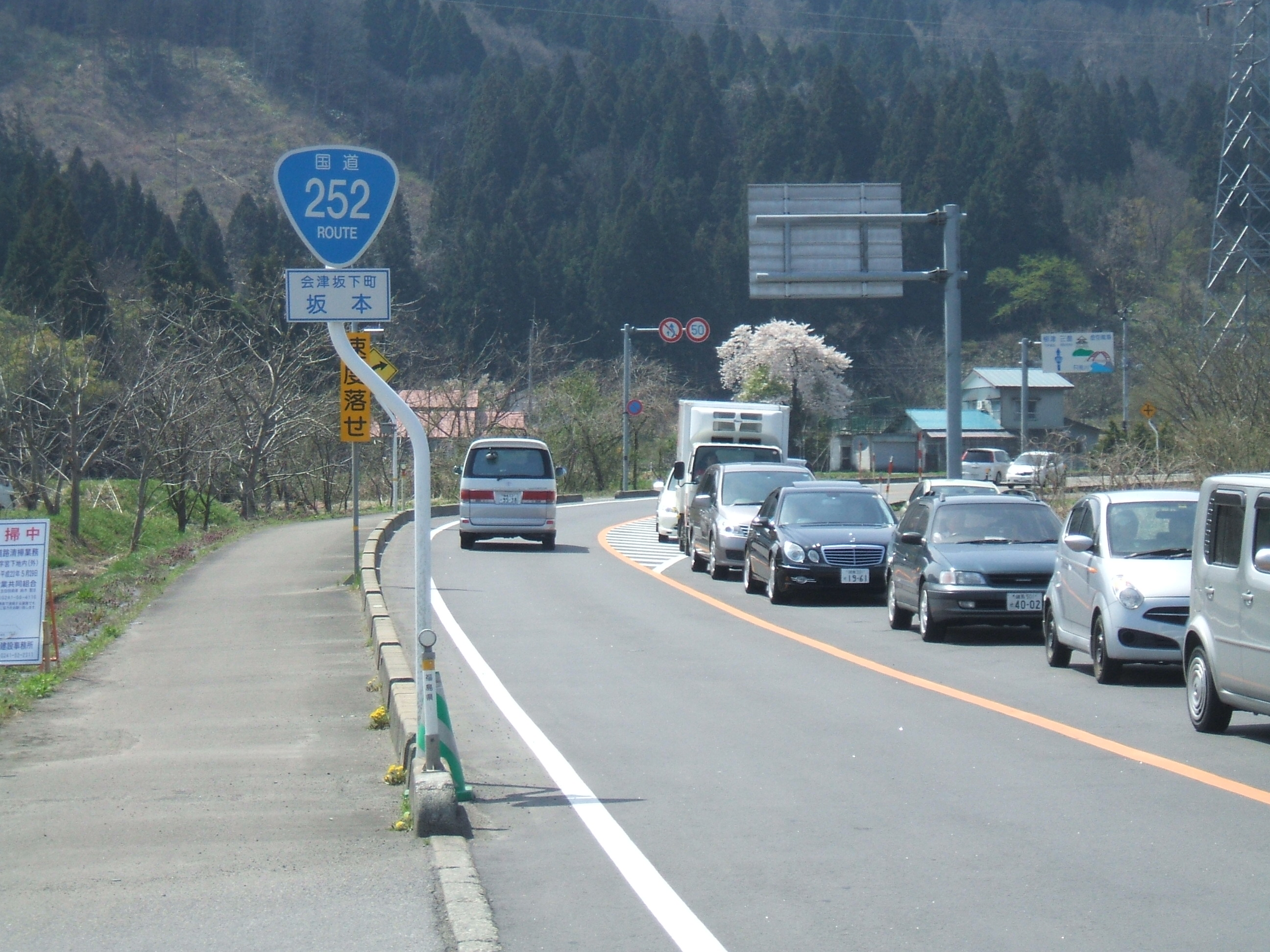

Route information
- Length: 204.6 km (127.1 mi)
- Existed: 1 April 1963–present

Location
- Country: Japan

Highway system
- National highways of Japan; Expressways of Japan
← National Route 251	→ National Route 253

National Route 252 is a national highway of Japan connecting Kashiwazaki, Niigata, and Aizuwakamatsu, Fukushima, in Japan, with a total length of 204.6 km (127.13 mi).

== Route description ==
A section of National Route 252 in the town of Kaneyama in Fukushima Prefecture is a musical road. Parts of the highway close in winter, making the Tadami line the only means of transport between several towns.

== See also ==
- Tadami Line
