= Tagokura Station =

Former railway station in Japan

Coordinates: 37.3176°N 139.2552°E

Tagokura Station 田子倉駅
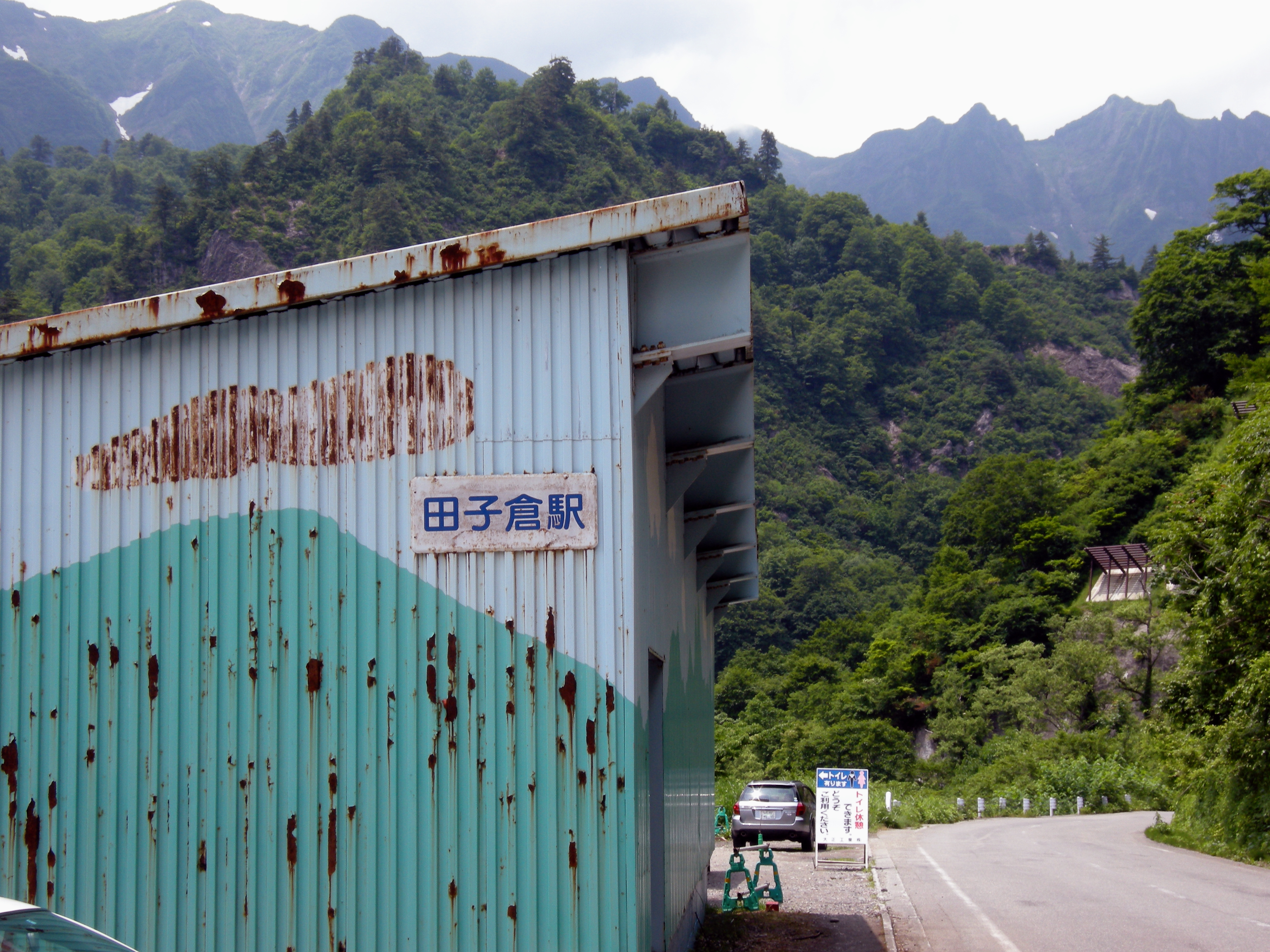
- Station structure and entrance, June 2010

General information
- Location: Tadami, Minamiaizu, Fukushima （福島県南会津郡只見町大字田子倉字後山） Japan
- Operator: JR East
- Line: Tadami Line
- Platforms: 1 side platform

History
- Opened: 29 Aug, 1971
- Closed: 16 Mar, 2013

Passengers
- 2014: 0 daily
Location

Tagokura Station (田子倉駅, Tagokura-eki) was an unstaffed railway station on the Tadami Line in Tadami, Fukushima, Japan, operated by East Japan Railway Company (JR East). It opened in 1971 and closed in March 2013. The nearest open stations are Ōshirakawa to the west and Tadami to the east.

The station was located by National Route 252 and beside Lake Tagokura. There are no shops or residences within miles of the station. The main users of the station were mountain climbers.

== History ==
Tagokura Station opened on 29 August 1971, and was unstaffed from the start. From December 2001, the station was closed during the winter season between December and March.

Heavy rain storms in July 2011 forced services on the section of the Tadami Line between Aizu-Kawaguchi and Ōshirakawa to be suspended, but the section between Tadami and Ōshirakawa, including Tagokura was reopened from 1 October 2012. From the start of the revised timetable on 16 March 2013, the station closed permanently, due to low passenger usage—being used on average by roughly one person per day.

== Gallery ==
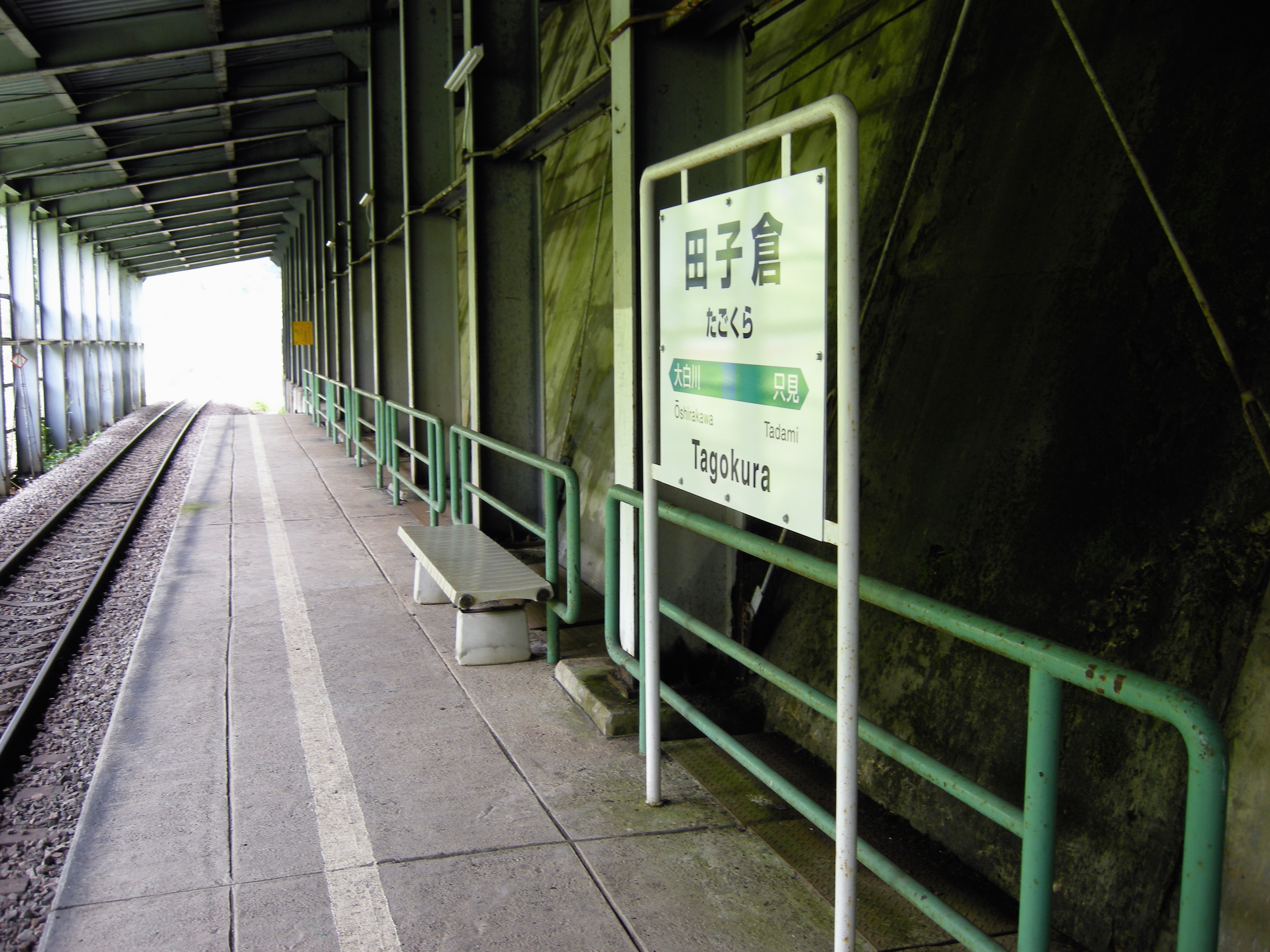
View of the platform, June 2010

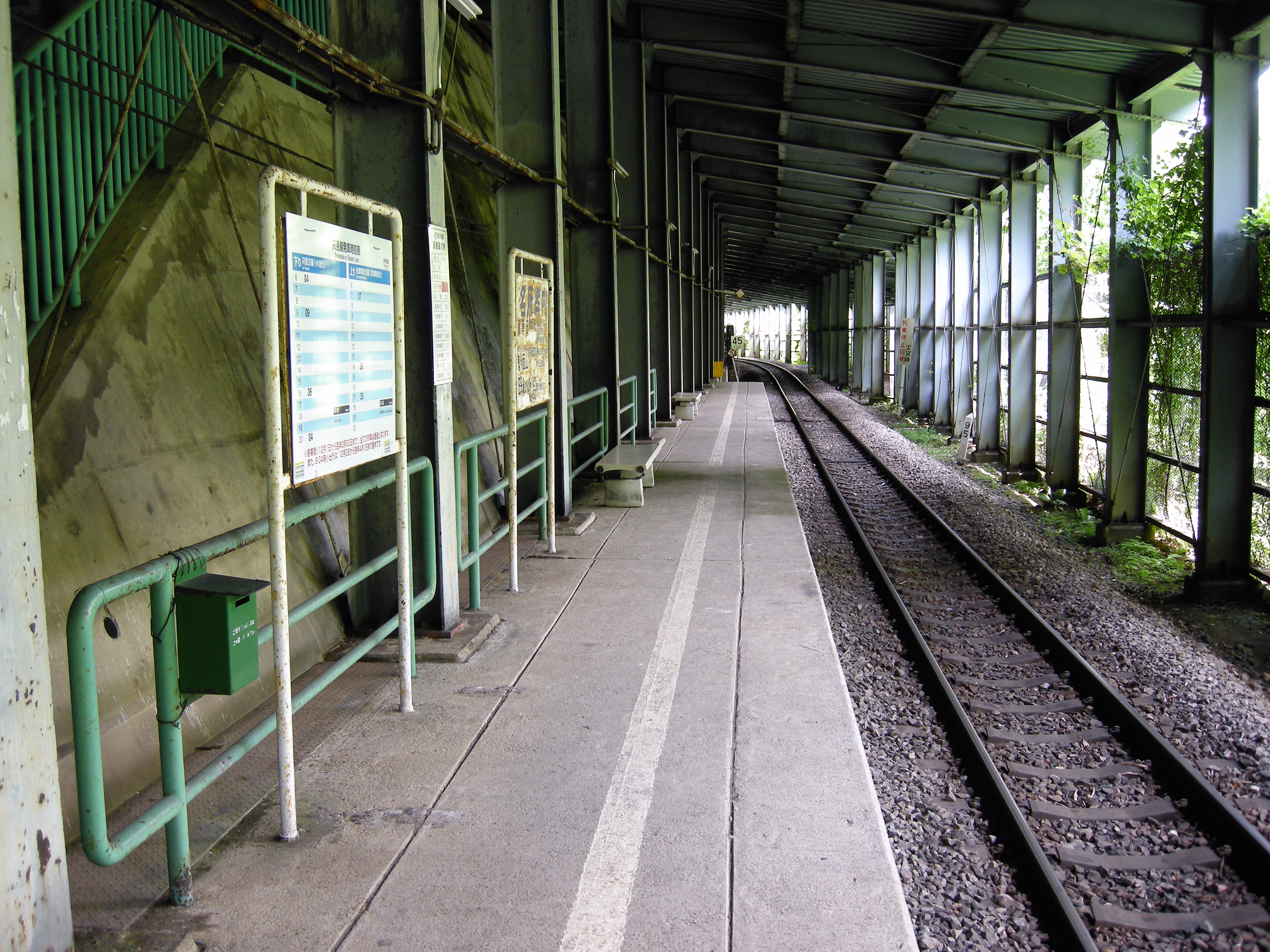
View of the platform, June 2010

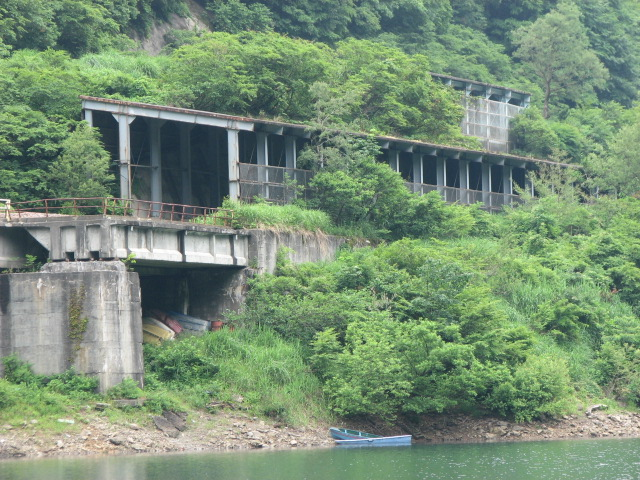
View of the station from a distance across Lake Tagokura, June 2008
