= KiHa E120 =

Japanese train type

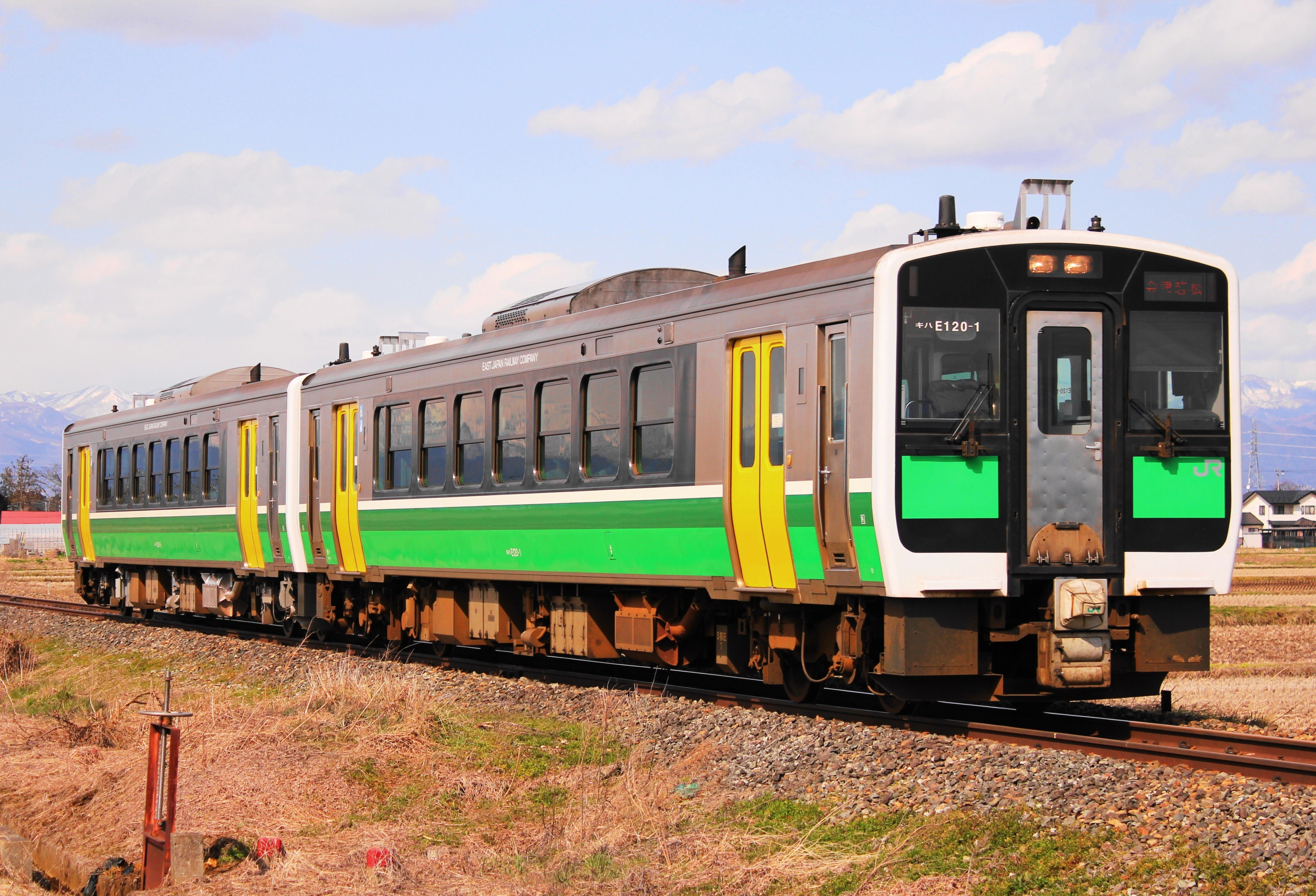
- KiHa E120 operated on Tadami Line, March 2020
- In service: 2008–Present
- Manufacturer: Niigata Transys
- Replaced: KiHa 52, KiHa 58
- Constructed: 2008
- Number built: 8 vehicles
- Number in service: 8 vehicles
- Formation: Single car
- Capacity: 114 (39 seated)
- Operator: JR East
- Depot: Koriyama

Specifications
- Car body construction: Stainless steel
- Car length: 19,500 mm (64 ft 0 in)
- Width: 2,920 mm (9 ft 7 in)
- Doors: Two pairs per side
- Maximum speed: 100 km/h (60 mph)
- Weight: 38.5 t (37.9 long tons; 42.4 short tons)
- Prime mover: Komatsu DMF15HZ x1
- Power output: 331 kW (444 hp)
- Transmission: Hydraulic
- Bogies: DT74 (motored); TR259 (trailer)
- Track gauge: 1,067 mm (3 ft 6 in)

The KiHa E120 (キハE120形) is a single-car diesel multiple unit (DMU) train type operated by East Japan Railway Company (JR East) since November 2008.

The "KiHa" designation derives from the classification system used by Japanese National Railways (JNR). "Ki" indicates a diesel-powered vehicle, while "Ha" indicates an ordinary passenger car, as opposed to a green car.

== Operations ==
Eight cars (numbered KiHa E120-1 to 8) are based at Koriyama Depot and are used on the following routes.

- Tadami Line (Aizu-Wakamatsu – Aizu-Kawaguchi, since March 2020)

=== Former operations ===
Until March 2020, the fleet was based at Niitsu Depot and used interchangeably with KiHa 110 series DMUs on the following routes.

- Banetsu West Line (Niitsu – Aizu-Wakamatsu)
- Uetsu Main Line (Niitsu – Sakata)
- Shinetsu Main Line (Niitsu – Niigata)
- Yonesaka Line
- Hakushin Line (Rapid Benibana and 1 local train only)
Operations in Niigata and Aizu area. KiHa E120 is only on Tadami Line

Operations as of July 2014

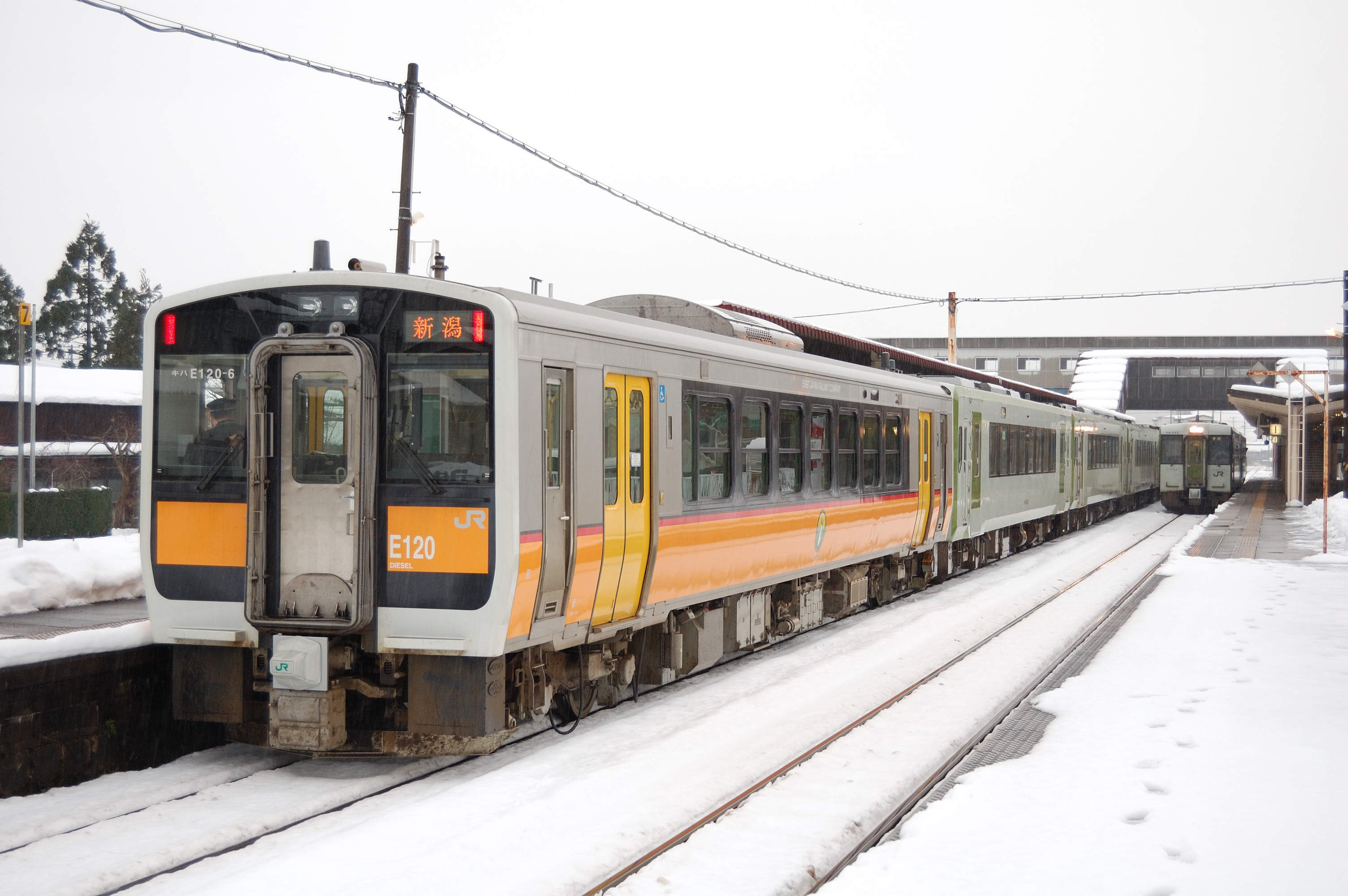
KiHa E120 on Ban'etsu West Line, December 2009

== Exterior ==
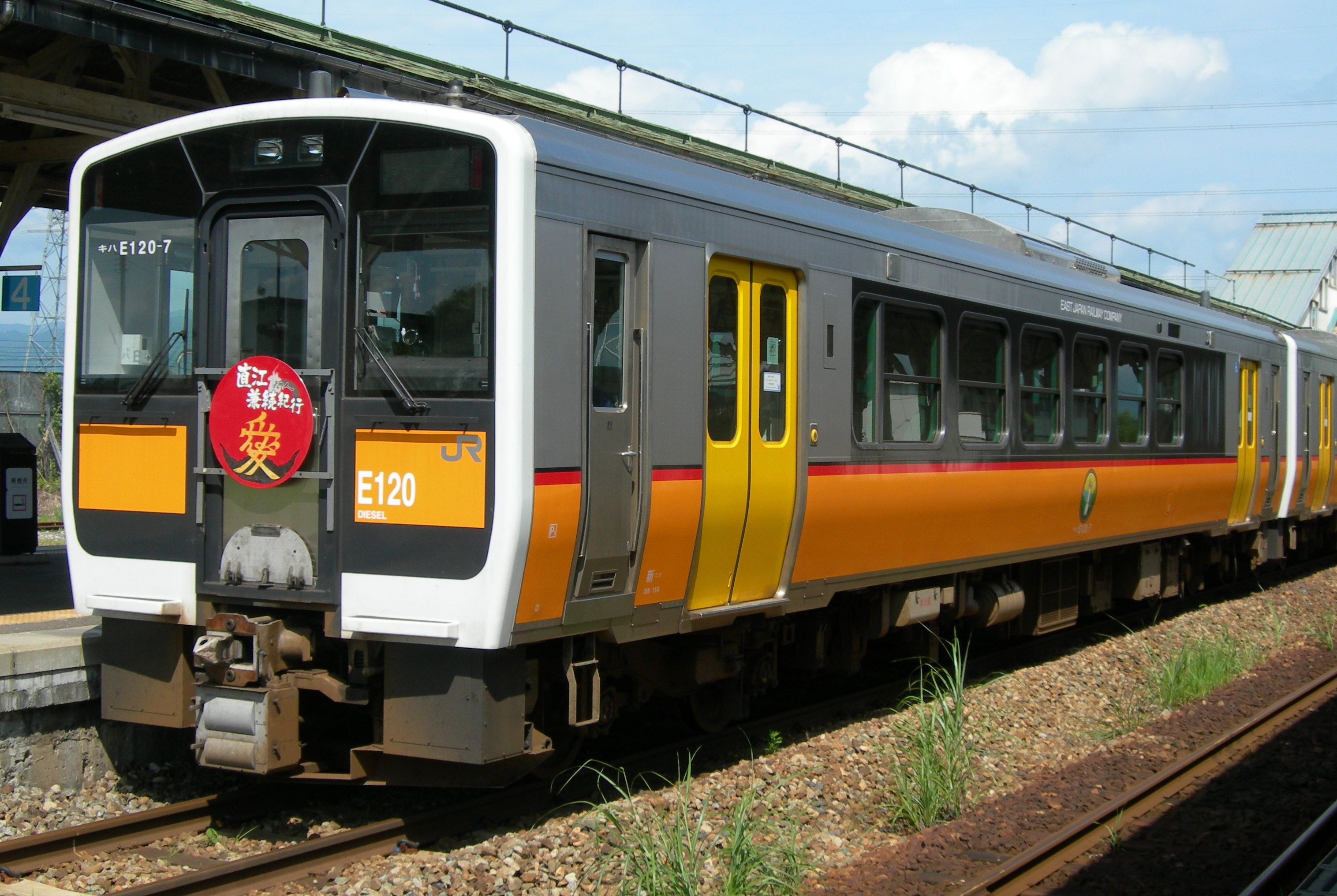
KiHa E120 in original livery, at Imaizumi Station, in July 2009

The body design is based on the KiHa E200 DMU, and uses a new diesel engine reducing NOx emissions.

Externally, the orange colour scheme is intended to evoke the autumn leaf colour of the beech forests of the Iide mountains in Niigata, Fukushima, and Yamagata Prefectures.

Between 2019 and 2020, the fleet received a green colour scheme, at the same time as the transfer from Niitsu Depot to Koriyama Depot.

== Interior ==
Passenger accommodation consists of 1+2 abreast facing seating bays in the centre of each car, and longitudinal bench seating at the ends of cars. Each car has a universal access toilet.

The cars are equipped with fare machines for use on wanman driver-only-operated services.

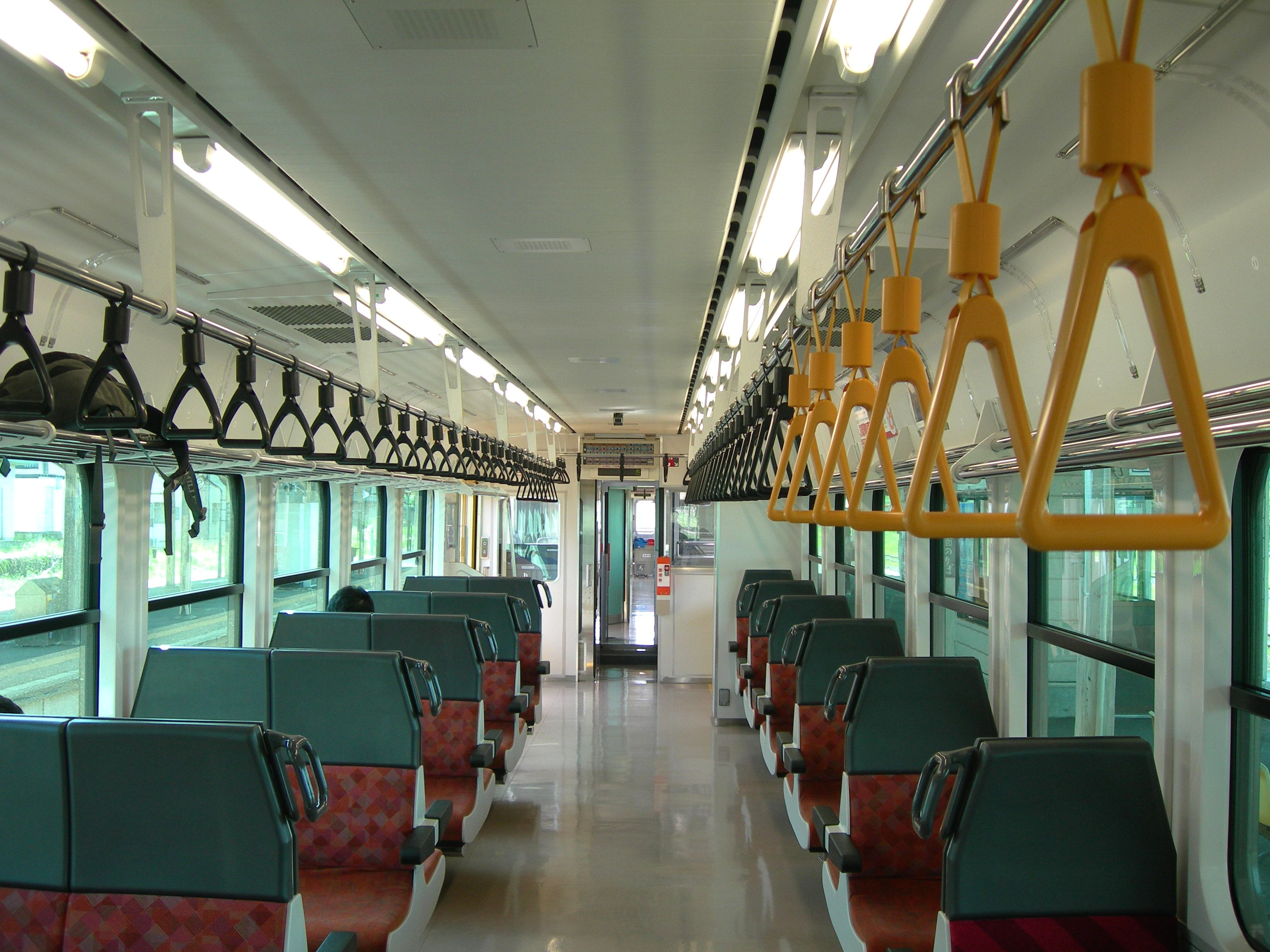
Interior view

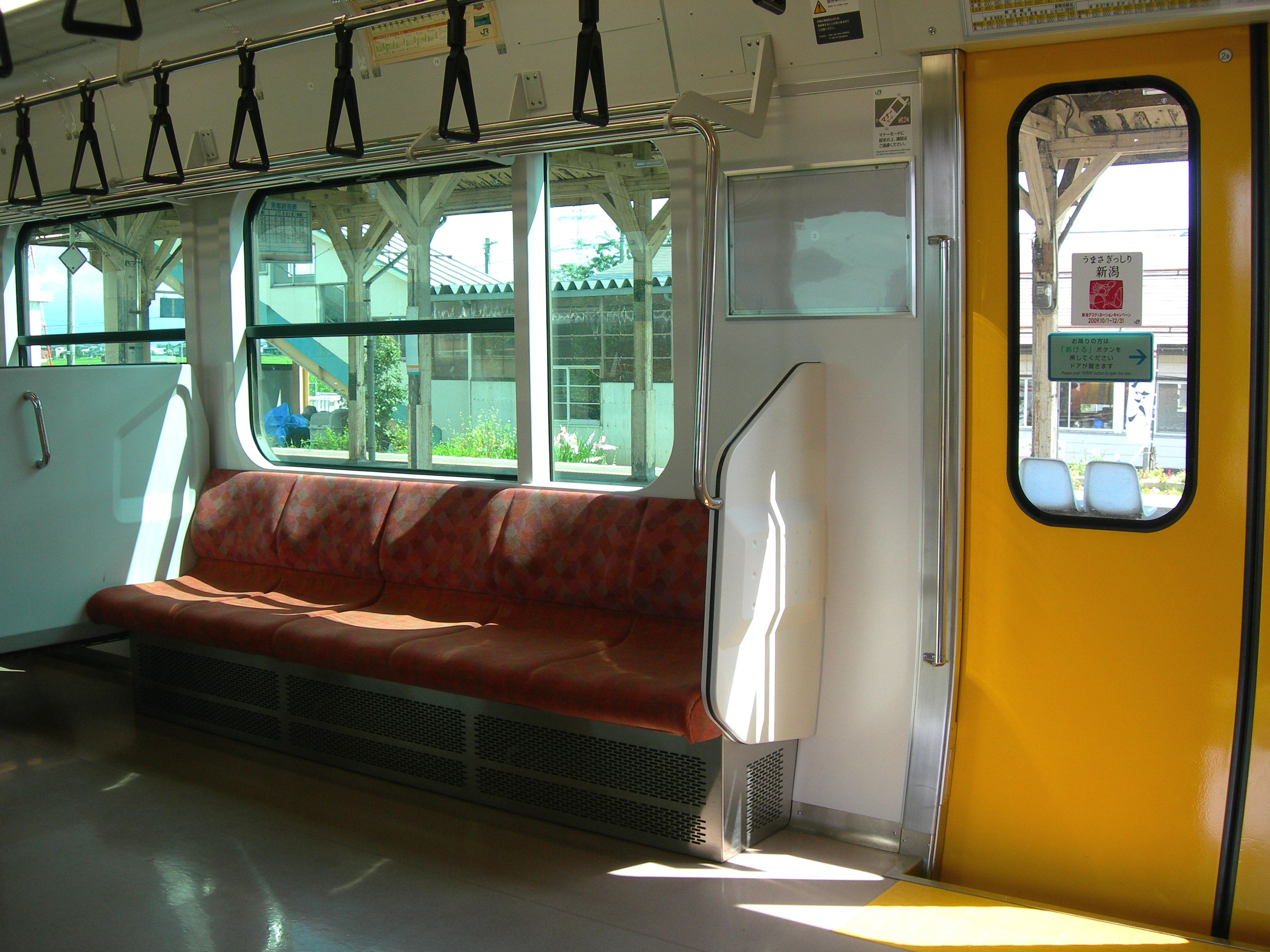
Longitudinal bench seats next to door area

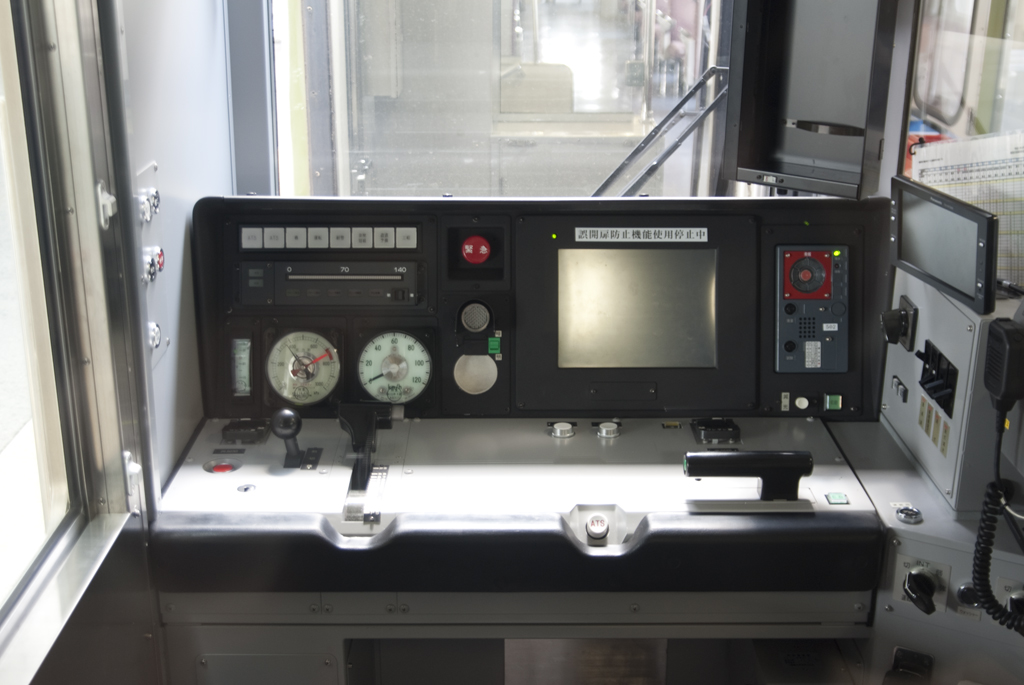
Control platform

== History ==
Eight cars were built by Niigata Transys in May 2008, entering revenue service from 1 November 2008.
