= Wakamiya Station =

Railway station in Aizubange, Fukushima Prefecture, Japan

Wakamiya Station 若宮駅
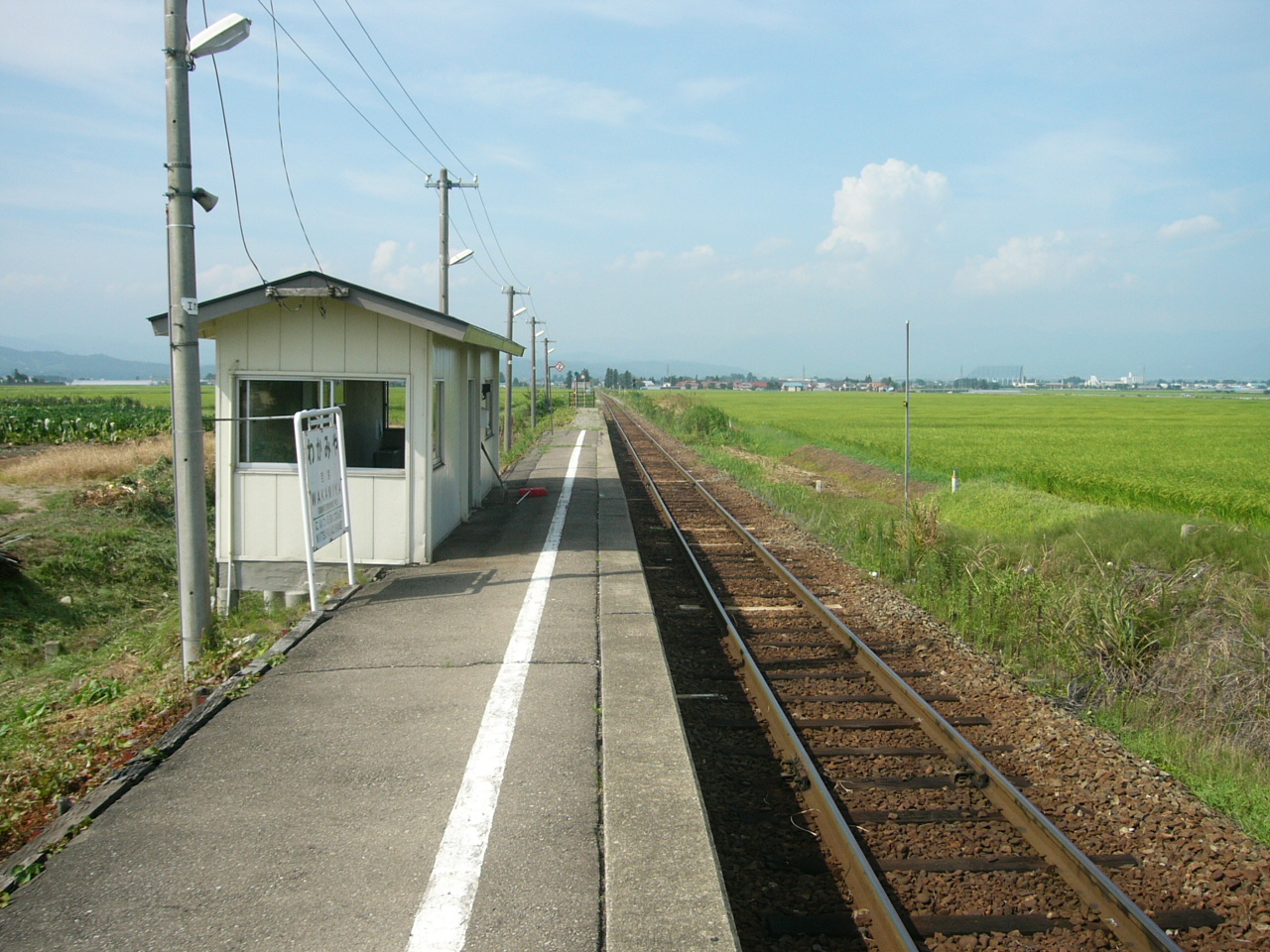
- Wakamiya Station in August 2006

General information
- Location: Gonohei, Aizubange-machi, Kawanuma-gun, Fukushima-ken 969-6526; Japan
- Coordinates: 37.5352°N 139.8284°E
- Operator: JR East
- Line: ■ Tadami Line
- Distance: 18.9 km from Aizu-Wakamatsu
- Platforms: 1 side platform
- Tracks: 1

Other information
- Status: Unstaffed
- Website: Official website

History
- Opened: November 1, 1934

Services
Preceding station	JR East	Following station
Aizu-Bange towards Koide	Tadami Line	Niitsuru towards Aizu-Wakamatsu
Location
- Location within JR Tadami Line Location within Fukushima Prefecture Location within Japan

Wakamiya Station (若宮駅, Wakamiya-eki) is a railway station on the Tadami Line in the town of Aizubange, Fukushima Prefecture, Japan, operated by East Japan Railway Company (JR East).

== Lines ==
Wakamiya Station is served by the Tadami Line, and is located 18.9 kilometers from the official starting point of the line at Aizu-Wakamatsu.

== Station layout ==
Wakamiya Station has one side platform serving a single bi-directional track. The station is unattended. There is no station building, but only a shelter built onto the platform.

== History ==
Wakamiya Station opened on November 1, 1934, as an intermediate station on the initial eastern section of the Japanese National Railways (JNR) Tadami Line between Aizu-Wakamatsu and Aizu-Yanaizu. Operations were suspended from Jule 10, 1945 to June 10, 1946. The station was absorbed into the JR East network upon the privatization of the JNR on April 1, 1987.

== Surrounding area ==
- Aizu-Bange Wakamiya Elementary School

== See also ==
- List of railway stations in Japan
