= Negishi Station (Fukushima) =

Railway station in Aizumisato, Fukushima Prefecture, Japan

Negishi Station 根岸駅
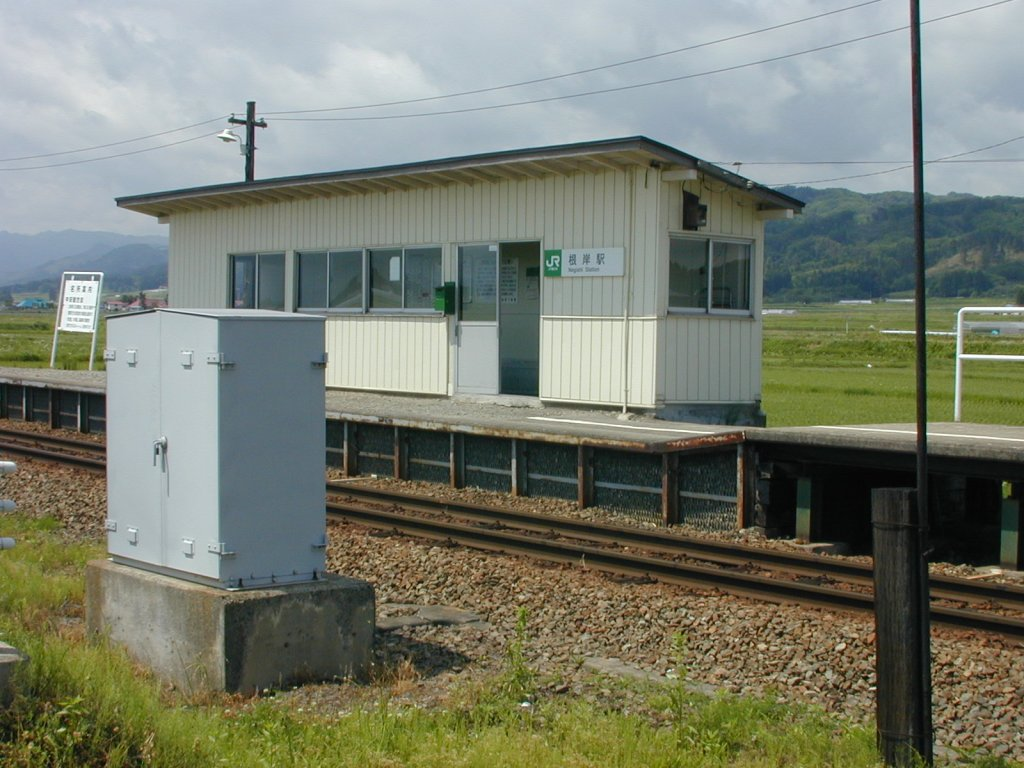
- Negishi Station in May 2006

General information
- Location: Yoneda, Aizumisato-machi, Ōnuma-gun, Fukushima-ken 969-6405; Japan
- Coordinates: 37°30′07″N 139°49′43″E
- Operator: JR East
- Line: ■ Tadami Line
- Distance: 14.8 km from Aizu-Wakamatsu
- Platforms: 1 side platform
- Tracks: 1

Other information
- Status: Unstaffed
- Website: Official website

History
- Opened: November 1, 1934

Services
Preceding station	JR East	Following station
Niitsuru towards Koide	Tadami Line	Aizu-Takada towards Aizu-Wakamatsu
Location
- Location within JR Tadami Line Location within Fukushima Prefecture Location within Japan

Negishi Station (根岸駅, Negishi-eki) is a railway station on the Tadami Line in the town of Aizumisato, Fukushima Prefecture, Japan, operated by East Japan Railway Company (JR East).

== Lines ==
Negishi Station is served by the Tadami Line, and is located 14.8 rail kilometers from the official starting point of the line at Aizu-Wakamatsu.

== Station layout ==
Negishi Station has one side platform serving a single bi-directional track. There is no station building, but only a shelter on the platform. The station is unattended.

== History ==
Negishi Station opened on November 1, 1934, as an intermediate station on the initial eastern section of the Japanese National Railways (JNR) Tadami Line between Aizu-Wakamatsu and Aizu-Yanaizu. The station was absorbed into the JR East network upon the privatization of the JNR on April 1, 1987.

== Surrounding area ==
- Koan-ji
- Niitsuru onsen

== See also ==
- List of railway stations in Japan
