= Aizu-Bange Station =

Railway station in Aizubange, Fukushima Prefecture, Japan

Aizu-Bange Station 会津坂下駅
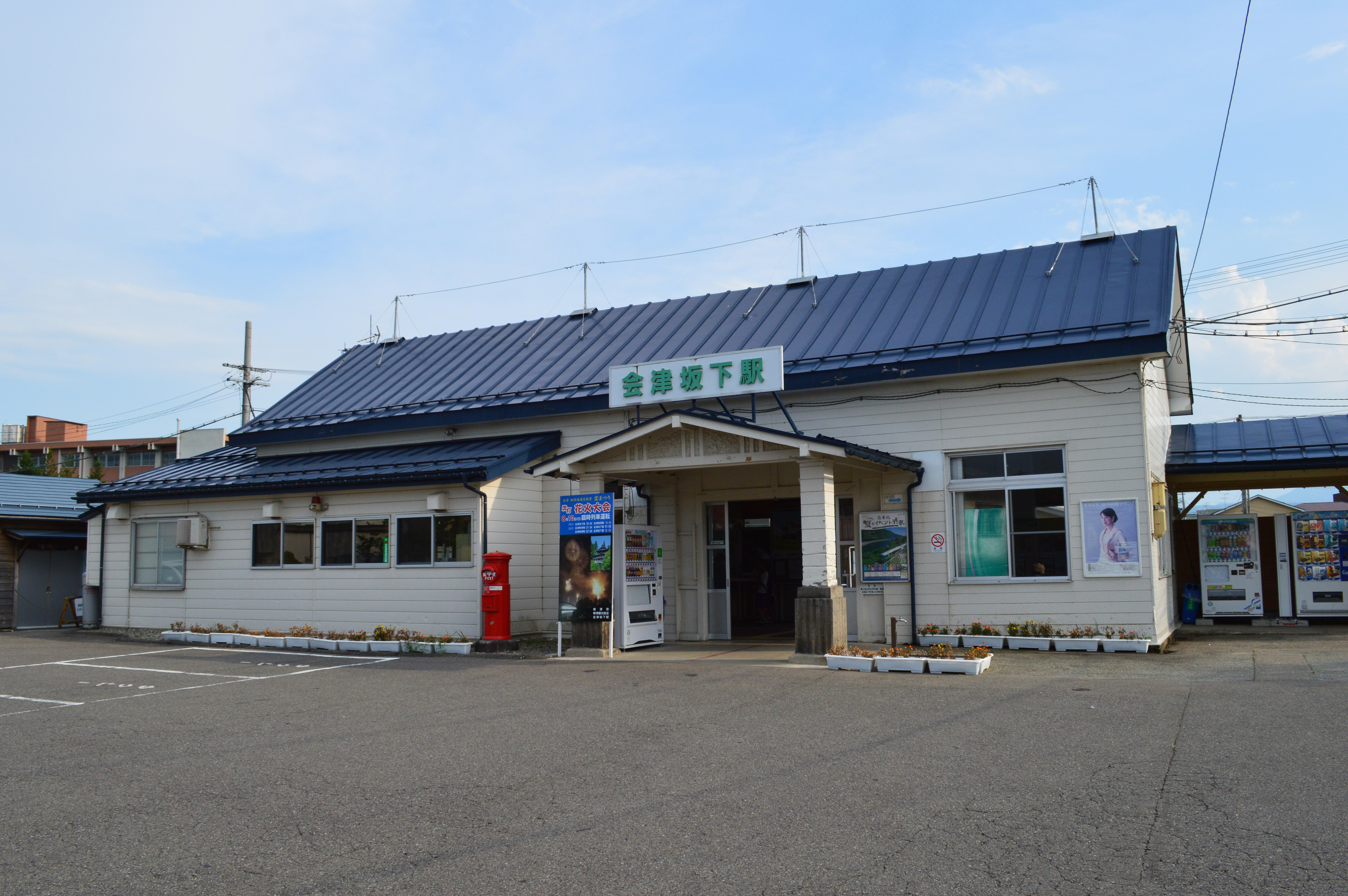
- Aizu-Bange Station in August 2014

General information
- Location: 1270 Gotanda, Aizubange-machi, Kawanuma-gun, Fukushima-ken 969-6545; Japan
- Coordinates: 37.5569°N 139.8217°E
- Operator: JR East
- Line: ■ Tadami Line
- Distance: 21.6 km from Aizu-Wakamatsu
- Platforms: 2 side platforms
- Tracks: 2

Other information
- Status: Staffed (Midori no Madoguchi)
- Website: Official website

History
- Opened: October 15, 1926

Passengers
- FY2017: 385 daily

Services
Preceding station	JR East	Following station
Tōdera towards Koide	Tadami Line	Wakamiya towards Aizu-Wakamatsu
Location
- Location within JR Tadami Line Location within Fukushima Prefecture Location within Japan

Aizu-Bange Station (会津坂下駅, Aizu-Bange-eki) is a railway station on the Tadami Line in the town of Aizubange, Fukushima Prefecture, Japan, operated by East Japan Railway Company (JR East).

== Lines ==
Aizu-Bange Station is served by the Tadami Line, and is located 21.6 kilometers from the official starting point of the line at Aizu-Wakamatsu.

== Station layout ==
Aizu-Bange Station has two opposed side platforms, connected to the station building by a level crossing. The station has a Midori no Madoguchi staffed ticket office.

=== Platforms ===
1	■ Tadami Line	for Nishi-Wakamatsu and Aizu-Wakamatsu
2	■ Tadami Line	for Aizuwakamatsu for Aizu-Miyashita, Aizu-Kawaguchi and Tadami

== History ==
Aizu-Bange Station opened on October 15, 1926, as an intermediate station on the initial eastern section of the Japanese National Railways (JNR) Tadami Line between Aizu-Wakamatsu and Aizu-Yanaizu. The station was absorbed into the JR East network upon the privatization of the JNR on April 1, 1987.

== Passenger statistics ==
In fiscal 2017, the station was used by an average of 385 passengers daily (boarding passengers only).

== Surrounding area ==
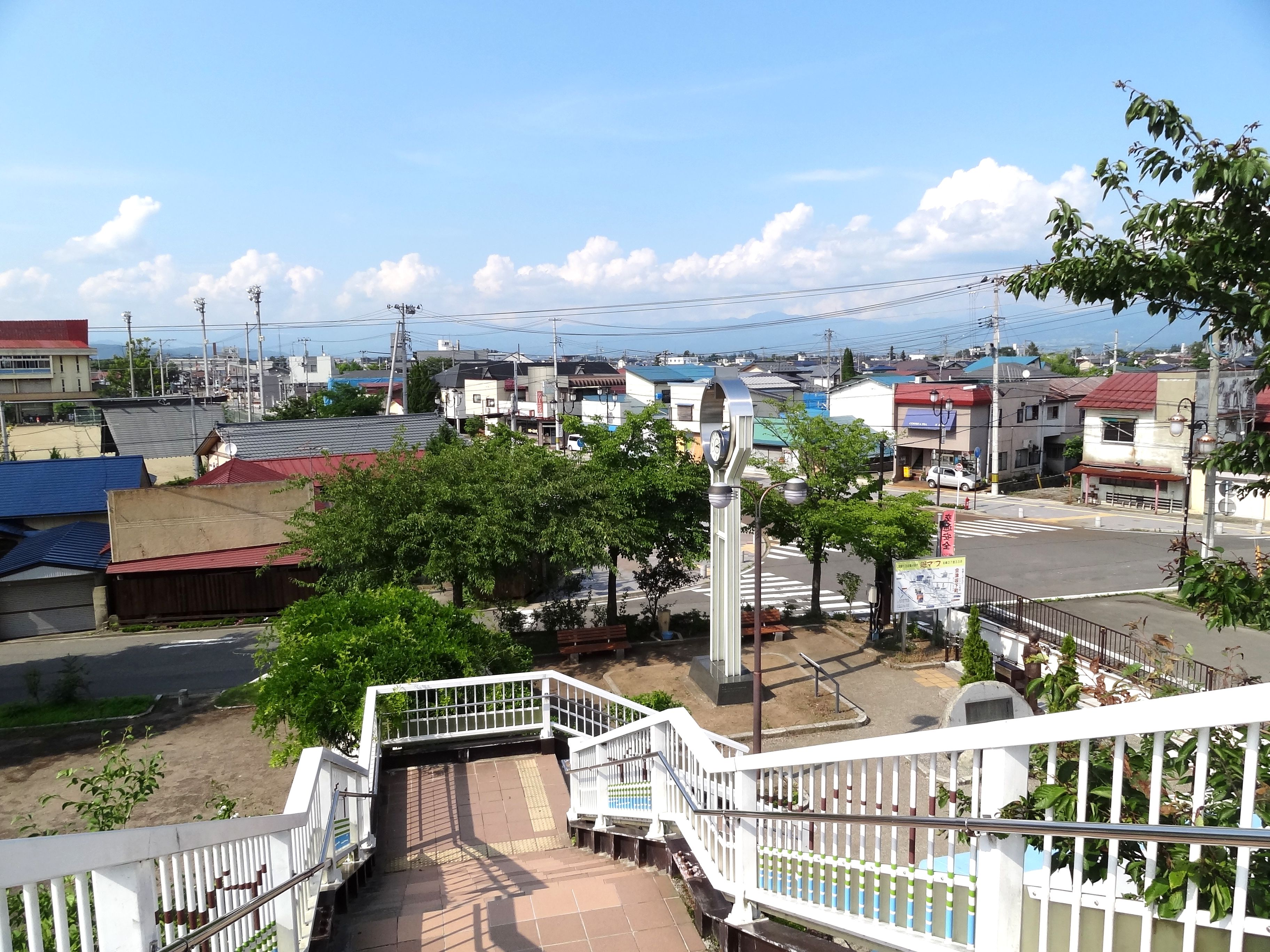
View from the station

- Aizubange Town Hall
- Bange Post Office
- Aizubange Public Gymnasium
- National Route 49
- Hachiro Kasuga Memorial Museum

== See also ==
- List of railway stations in Japan
