= Aizu-Hongō Station =

Railway station in Aizuwakamatsu, Fukushima Prefecture, Japan

Aizu-Hongō Station 会津本郷駅
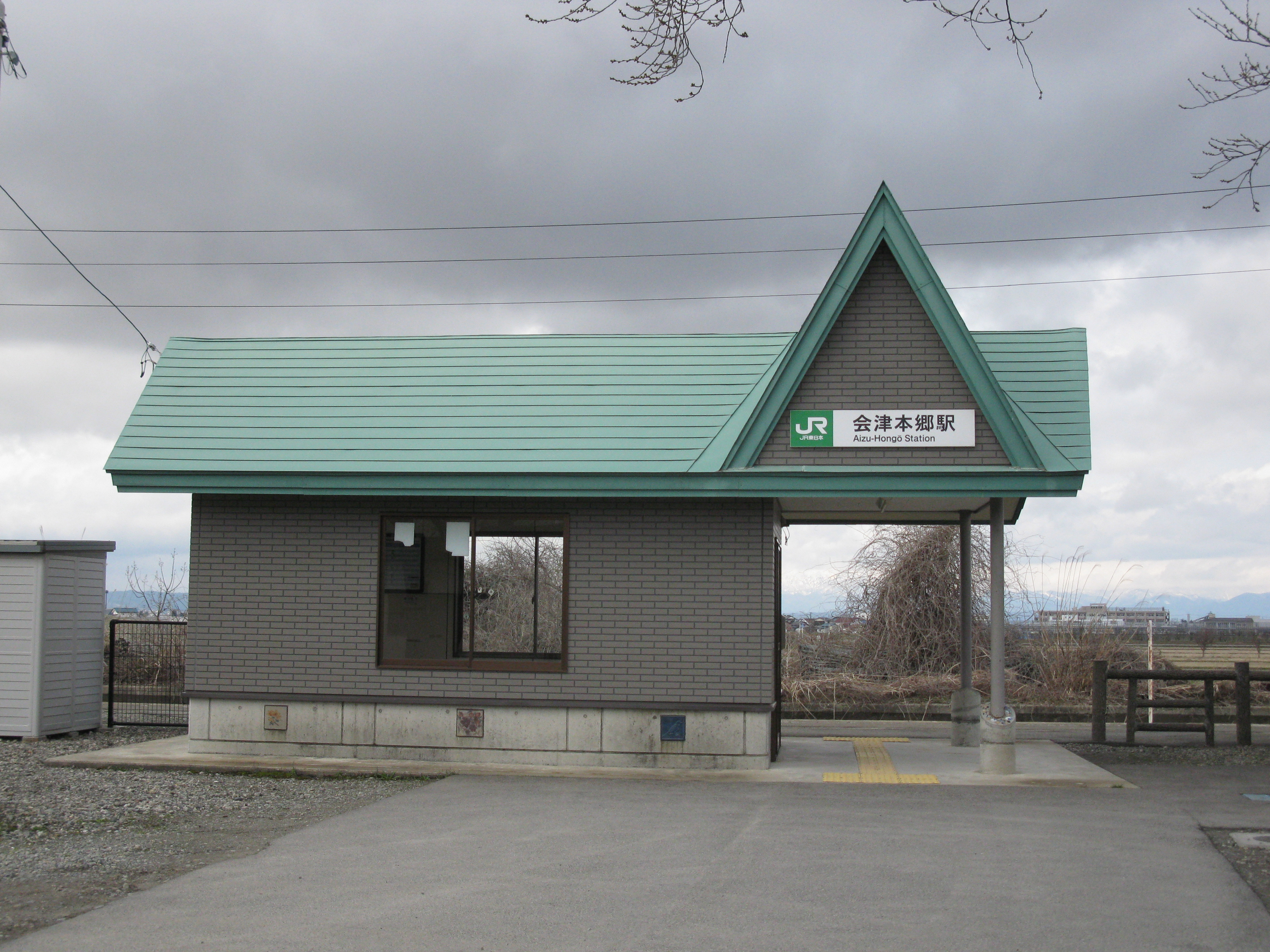
- Aizu-Hongō Station in April 2010

General information
- Location: 2104 Kitaaizu-cho Kamiyonezuka, Aizuwakamatsu-shi, Fukushima-ken 969-6183; Japan
- Coordinates: 37°27′48″N 139°53′35″E
- Operator: JR East
- Line: ■ Tadami Line
- Distance: 6.5 km from Aizu-Wakamatsu
- Platforms: 1 side platform
- Tracks: 1

Other information
- Status: Unstaffed
- Website: Official website

History
- Opened: October 15, 1926

Services
Preceding station	JR East	Following station
Aizu-Takada towards Koide	Tadami Line	Nishi-Wakamatsu towards Aizu-Wakamatsu
Location
- Location within JR Tadami Line Location within Fukushima Prefecture Location within Japan

Aizu-Hongō Station (会津本郷駅, Aizu-Hongō-eki) is a railway station on the Tadami Line in the city of Aizuwakamatsu, Fukushima Prefecture, Japan, operated by East Japan Railway Company (JR East).

== Lines ==
Aizu-Hongō Station is served by the Tadami Line, and is located 6.5 kilometers from the official starting point of the line at Aizu-Wakamatsu Station.

== Station layout ==
Aizu-Hongō Station has a one side platform serving a single bi-directional track. The station is unattended.

== History ==
Aizu-Hongō Station opened on October 15, 1926, as an intermediate station on the initial eastern section of the Japanese National Railways (JNR) Tadami Line between Aizu-Wakamatsu and Aizu-Yanaizu. The station was absorbed into the JR East network upon the privatization of the JNR on April 1, 1987.

== Surrounding area ==
- former Aizu-Hongō Town Hall
- Aizu-Hongō Post Office
- Tachikawa Minami Elementary School
- National Route 118
- National Route 401
- Fukushima Prefectural Route 72
- Fukushima Prefectural Route 128
- Fukushima Prefectural Route 130
- Fukushima Prefectural Route 219

== See also ==
- List of railway stations in Japan
