= Tadami Line =

Railway line in Japan

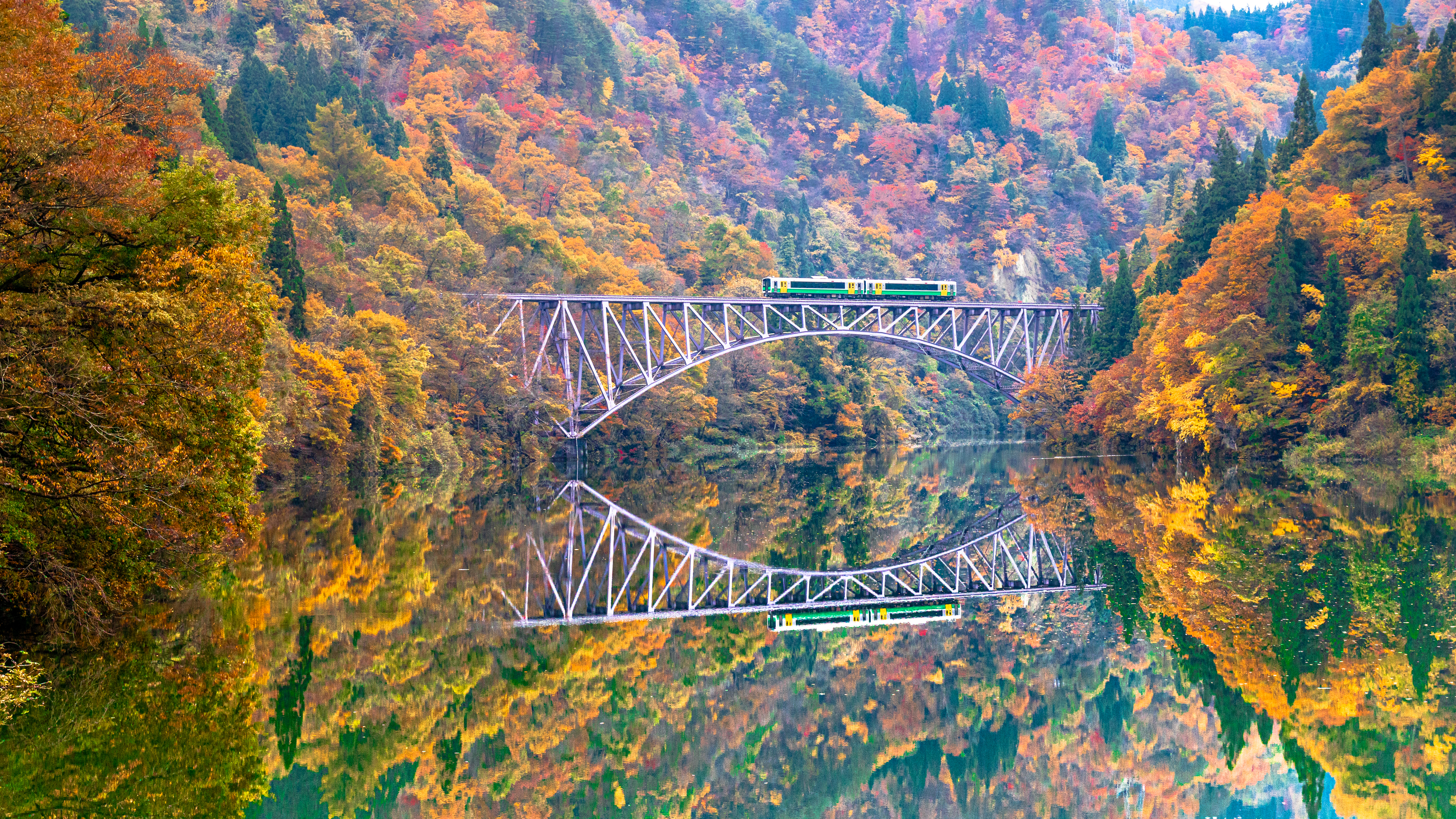
- Tadamigawa Bridge No. 1, November 2020

Overview
- Native name: 只見線
- Status: In operation
- Owner: JR East
- Locale: Fukushima, Niigata Prefectures
- Termini: Aizu-Wakamatsu; Koide
- Stations: 36

Service
- Type: Heavy rail
- Operator: JR East
- Rolling stock: KiHa 110 series, KiHa E120, AT-350 series, AT-400 series, AT-500 series, AT-600 series, AT-700 series DMU

History
- Opened: 1928; 98 years ago

Technical
- Line length: 135.2 km (84.0 mi)
- Number of tracks: Entire line single tracked
- Character: Rural and scenic
- Track gauge: 1,067 mm (3 ft 6 in)
- Electrification: None
- Operating speed: 65 km/h (40 mph)
Route map

The Tadami Line (只見線, Tadami-sen) is a 135-kilometre (84 mi) railway line in Japan operated by East Japan Railway Company (JR East). It connects Aizu-Wakamatsu Station at Aizuwakamatsu in Fukushima Prefecture with Koide Station at Uonuma in Niigata Prefecture.

The line opened in discontinuous stages between 1928 and 1971. Because of trouble financing rainstorm damage repairs, the line had no rail service between Aizu-Kawaguchi and Tadami station from July 2011 until October 2022. During this time, a replacement bus operated between Aizu-Kawaguchi and Tadami. Full service on the line resumed on 1 October 2022.

== Services ==
Linemap

All trains are local (all-stations) services, with approximately eight to nine trains in each direction per day. Only three round-trips operate over the entire line, and some seasonal trains operate through onto the line from the Ban'etsu West and Jōetsu lines. Due to the many curves on the line trains take over four hours to traverse its 135.2 km (84.0 mi) length.

== Station list ==
- All trains stop at every station.
- Trains can pass each other at stations marked "◇", "∨", "∧"; they cannot pass at those marked "｜".

Station	Japanese	Distance (km)		Transfers		Location	
Station	Japanese	Between stations	Total	Transfers		Location	
Aizu-Wakamatsu	会津若松	–	0.0	■ Ban'etsu West Line	∨	Aizuwakamatsu	Fukushima
Nanukamachi	七日町	1.3	1.3		｜	Aizuwakamatsu	Fukushima
Nishi-Wakamatsu	西若松	1.8	3.1	■ Aizu Railway Aizu Line (Note: All Aizu Line trains run through to Aizu-Wakamatsu Station.)	◇	Aizuwakamatsu	Fukushima
Aizu-Hongō	会津本郷	3.4	6.5		｜	Aizuwakamatsu	Fukushima
Aizu-Takada	会津高田	4.8	11.3		｜	Aizumisato, Ōnuma District	Fukushima
Negishi	根岸	3.5	14.8		｜	Aizumisato, Ōnuma District	Fukushima
Niitsuru	新鶴	2.0	16.8		｜	Aizumisato, Ōnuma District	Fukushima
Wakamiya	若宮	2.1	18.9		｜	Aizubange, Kawanuma District	Fukushima
Aizu-Bange	会津坂下	2.7	21.6		◇	Aizubange, Kawanuma District	Fukushima
Tōdera	塔寺	4.4	26.0		｜	Aizubange, Kawanuma District	Fukushima
Aizu-Sakamoto	会津坂本	3.7	29.7		｜	Aizubange, Kawanuma District	Fukushima
Aizu-Yanaizu	会津柳津	3.6	33.3		｜	Yanaizu, Kawanuma District	Fukushima
Gōdo	郷戸	3.6	36.9		｜	Yanaizu, Kawanuma District	Fukushima
Takiya	滝谷	2.7	39.6		｜	Yanaizu, Kawanuma District	Fukushima
Aizu-Hinohara	会津桧原	1.9	41.5		｜	Mishima, Ōnuma District	Fukushima
Aizu-Nishikata	会津西方	2.2	43.7		｜	Mishima, Ōnuma District	Fukushima
Aizu-Miyashita	会津宮下	1.7	45.4		◇	Mishima, Ōnuma District	Fukushima
Hayato	早戸	5.8	51.2		｜	Mishima, Ōnuma District	Fukushima
Aizu-Mizunuma	会津水沼	3.9	55.1		｜	Kaneyama, Ōnuma District	Fukushima
Aizu-Nakagawa	会津中川	3.2	58.3		｜	Kaneyama, Ōnuma District	Fukushima
Aizu-Kawaguchi	会津川口	2.5	60.8		◇	Kaneyama, Ōnuma District	Fukushima
Honna	本名	2.8	63.6		｜	Kaneyama, Ōnuma District	Fukushima
Aizu-Kosugawa	会津越川	6.4	70.0		｜	Kaneyama, Ōnuma District	Fukushima
Aizu-Yokota	会津横田	3.2	73.2		｜	Kaneyama, Ōnuma District	Fukushima
Aizu-Ōshio	会津大塩	2.2	75.4		｜	Kaneyama, Ōnuma District	Fukushima
Aizu-Shiozawa	会津塩沢	5.5	80.9		｜	Tadami, Minamiaizu District	Fukushima
Aizu-Gamō	会津蒲生	3.0	83.9		｜	Tadami, Minamiaizu District	Fukushima
Tadami	只見	4.5	88.4		◇	Tadami, Minamiaizu District	Fukushima
(Tagokura)	(田子倉)	6.8	90.7	Station Closed 16 March 2013	◇	Tadami, Minamiaizu District	Fukushima
Ōshirakawa	大白川	19.5	109.2		◇	Uonuma	Niigata
(Kakinoki)	(柿ノ木)	3.2	112.4	Station Closed 14 March 2015	｜	Uonuma	Niigata
Irihirose	入広瀬	6.4	115.6		｜	Uonuma	Niigata
Kamijō	上条	3.1	118.7		｜	Uonuma	Niigata
Echigo-Suhara	越後須原	4.4	123.1		｜	Uonuma	Niigata
Uonuma-Tanaka	魚沼田中	3.9	127.0		｜	Uonuma	Niigata
Echigo-Hirose	越後広瀬	2.5	129.5		｜	Uonuma	Niigata
Yabukami	藪神	2.1	131.6		｜	Uonuma	Niigata
Koide	小出	3.6	135.2	■ Jōetsu Line	∧	Uonuma	Niigata

== History ==
=== Openings ===
The eastern section of the line from Aizu-Wakamatsu to Aizu-Yanaizu opened in 1928. The eastern section was extended to Aizu-Miyashita in 1941 and to Aizu-Kawaguchi in 1956. At that time, the Tagokura Dam was under construction and a light railway was built to link Aizu-Kawaguchi with the construction site in order to transport construction material. In 1963, after the dam was completed, the construction railway was upgraded and opened to Tadami as part of the eastern section.

In the meantime, the western section of the line, from Koide to Oshirakawa, had opened in 1942. In 1971, the two sections were connected with the opening of the passenger only line between Oshirakawa and Tadami.

=== Closures ===
Freight services ceased between 1980 and 1982.

Damage from heavy rain storms in July 2011 forced the section of the line between Aizu-Kawaguchi and Ōshirakawa to be closed. The section between Tadami and Ōshirakawa was reopened on 1 October 2012, but the restoration of the remaining section between Aizu-Kawaguchi and Tadami proved more problematic. Eventually, JR East reached an agreement with Fukushima Prefecture under which the prefecture would buy the rail infrastructure and land while hiring out its operation to JR East. After 11 years with a replacement bus service, the closed section resumed operations on 1 October 2022.

Tagokura Station, located between Ōshirakawa and Tadami, was closed in 2013. Kakinoki Station, between Irihirose and Ōshirakawa, was closed in 2015. Both of these station closures were due to very low usage.

== Rolling stock ==
- KiHa E120 - Since March 2020
- KiHa 110 series - Since July 2020

=== Former ===
- KiHa 40 series - Until July 2020
- KiHa 58 series

== Gallery ==
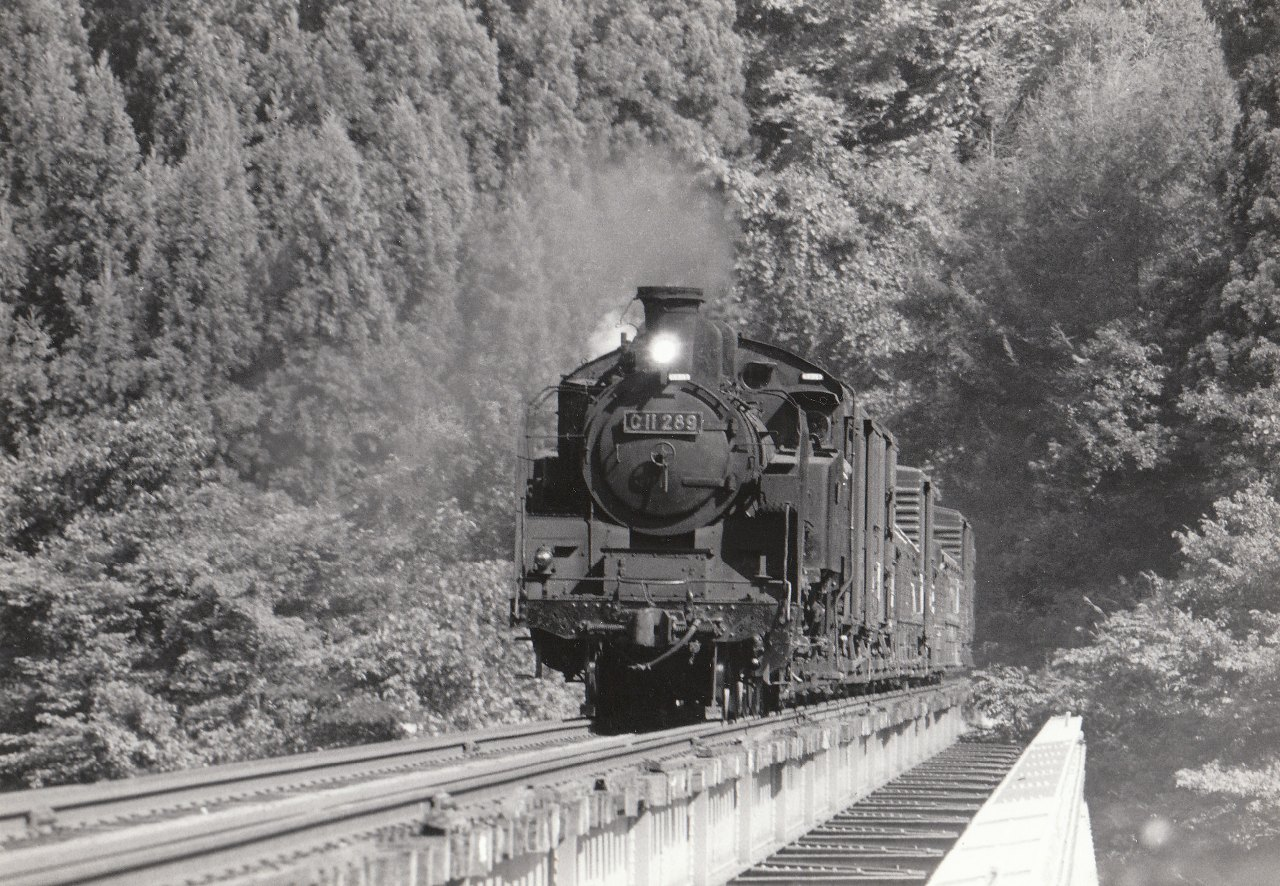
C11 289 between Aizu-Nishikata and Aizu-Hibara, November 1973

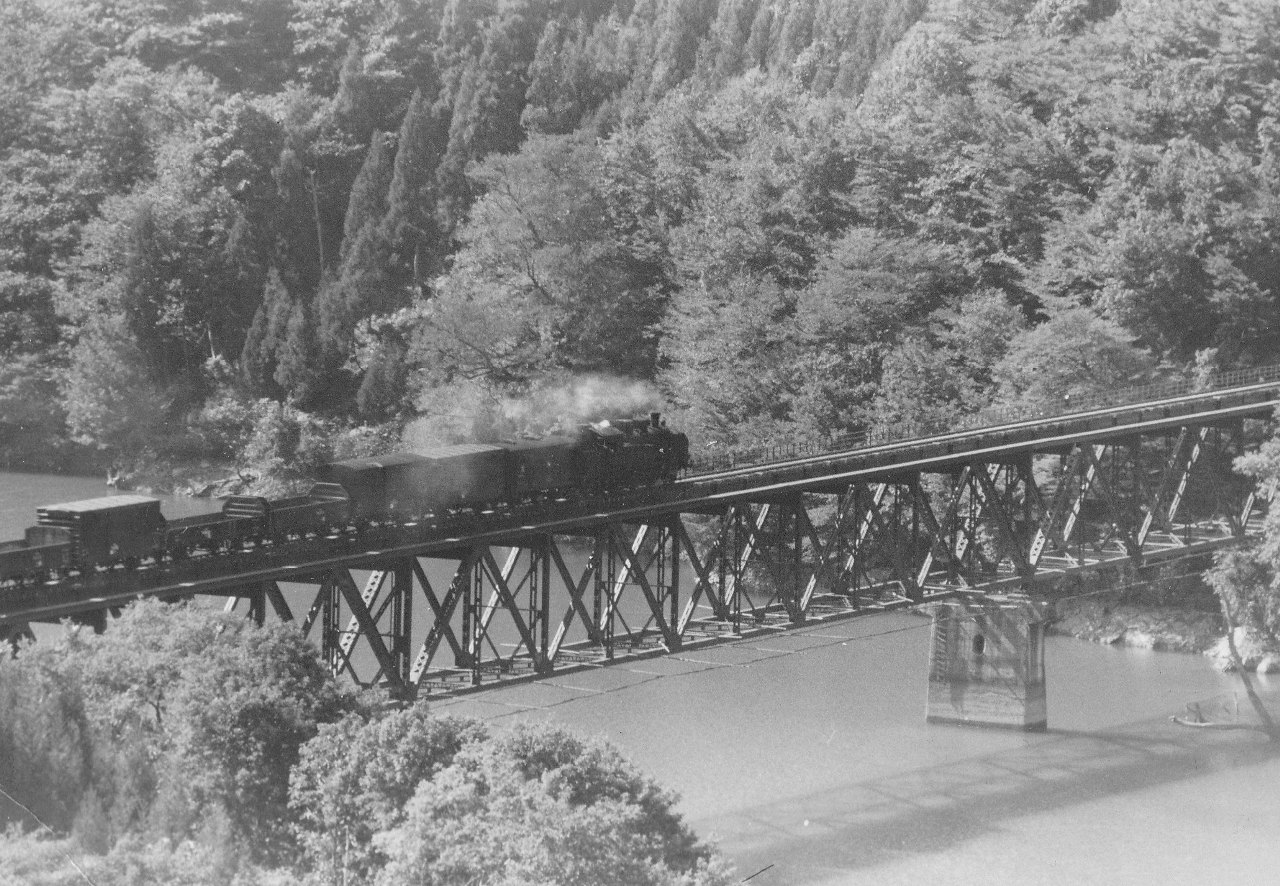
C11 289 between Aizu-Miyashita and Aizu-Nishikata, November 1973

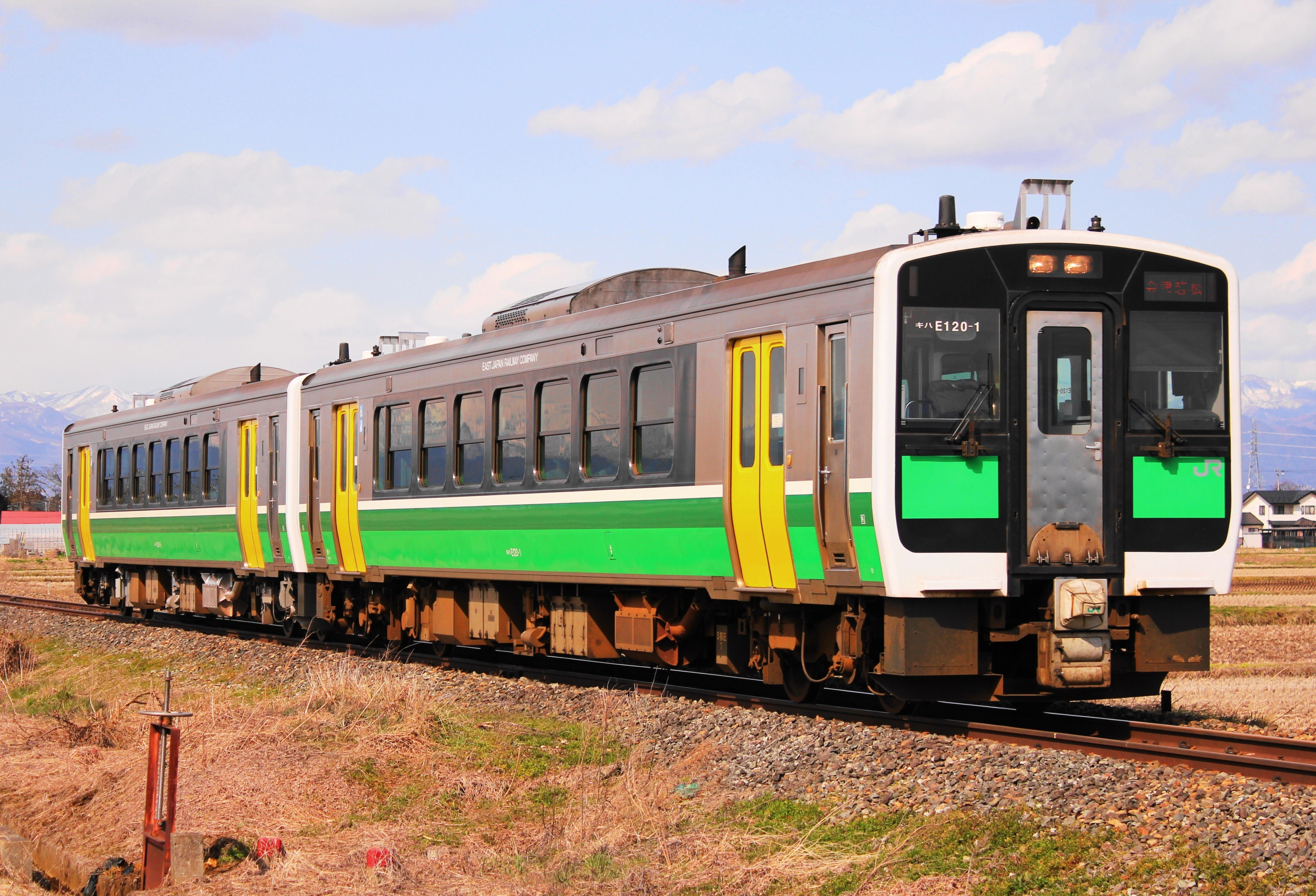
KiHa E120, Aizu-Bange Station - Wakamiya Station, in March 2020

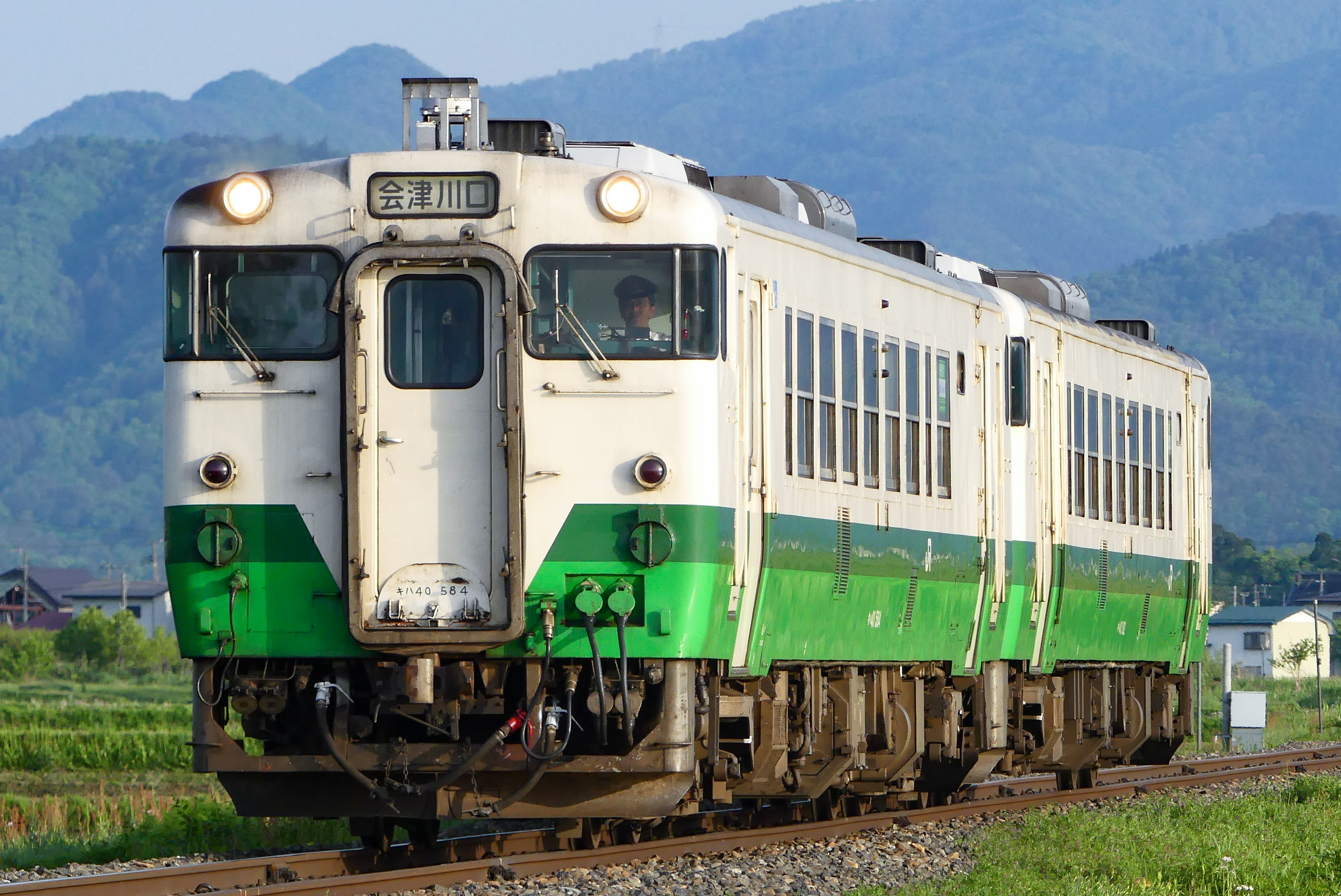
KiHa 40, Aizu-Takada Station - Negishi Station, in May 2018

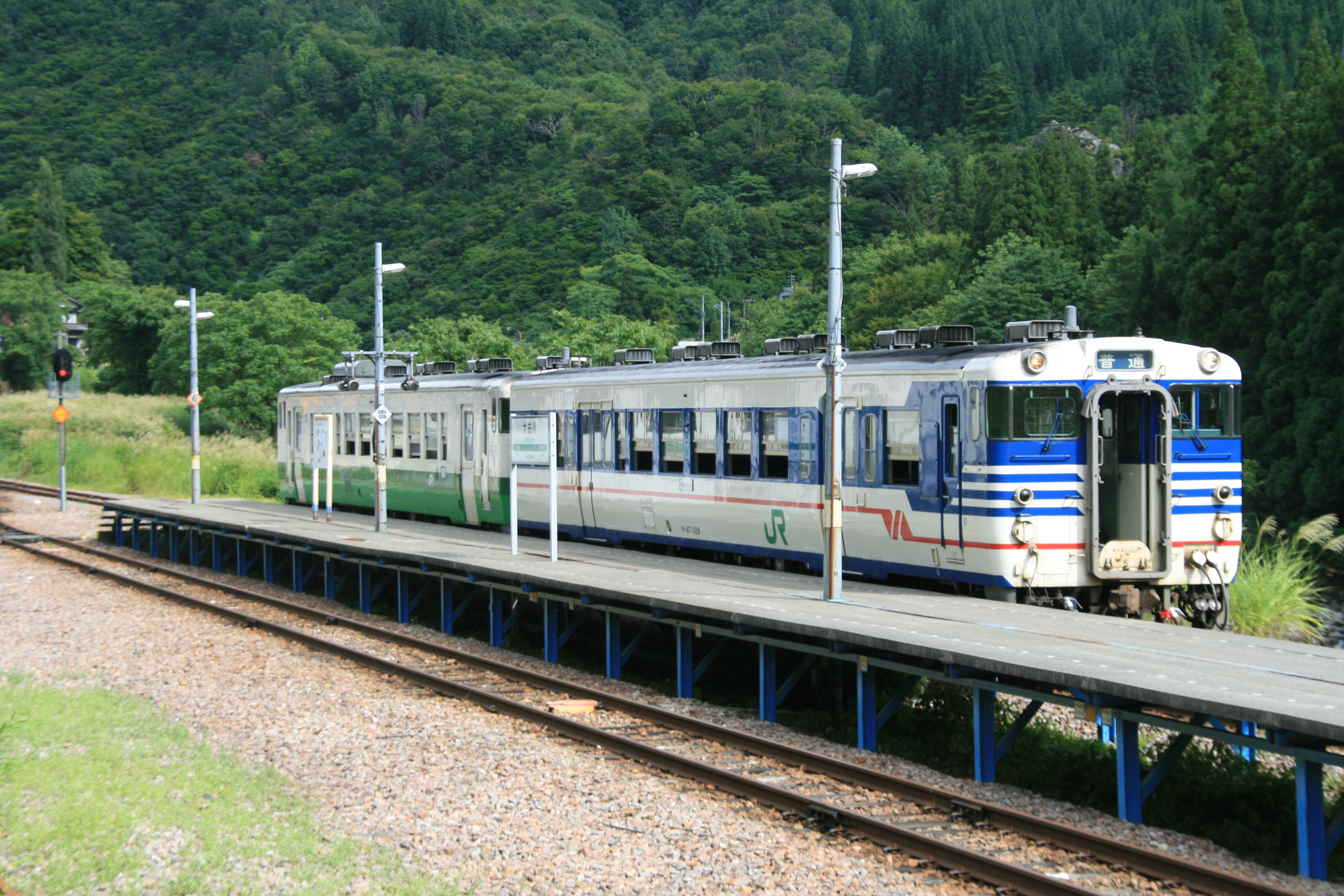
KiHa 47 and 40, Oshirakawa Station, September 2012

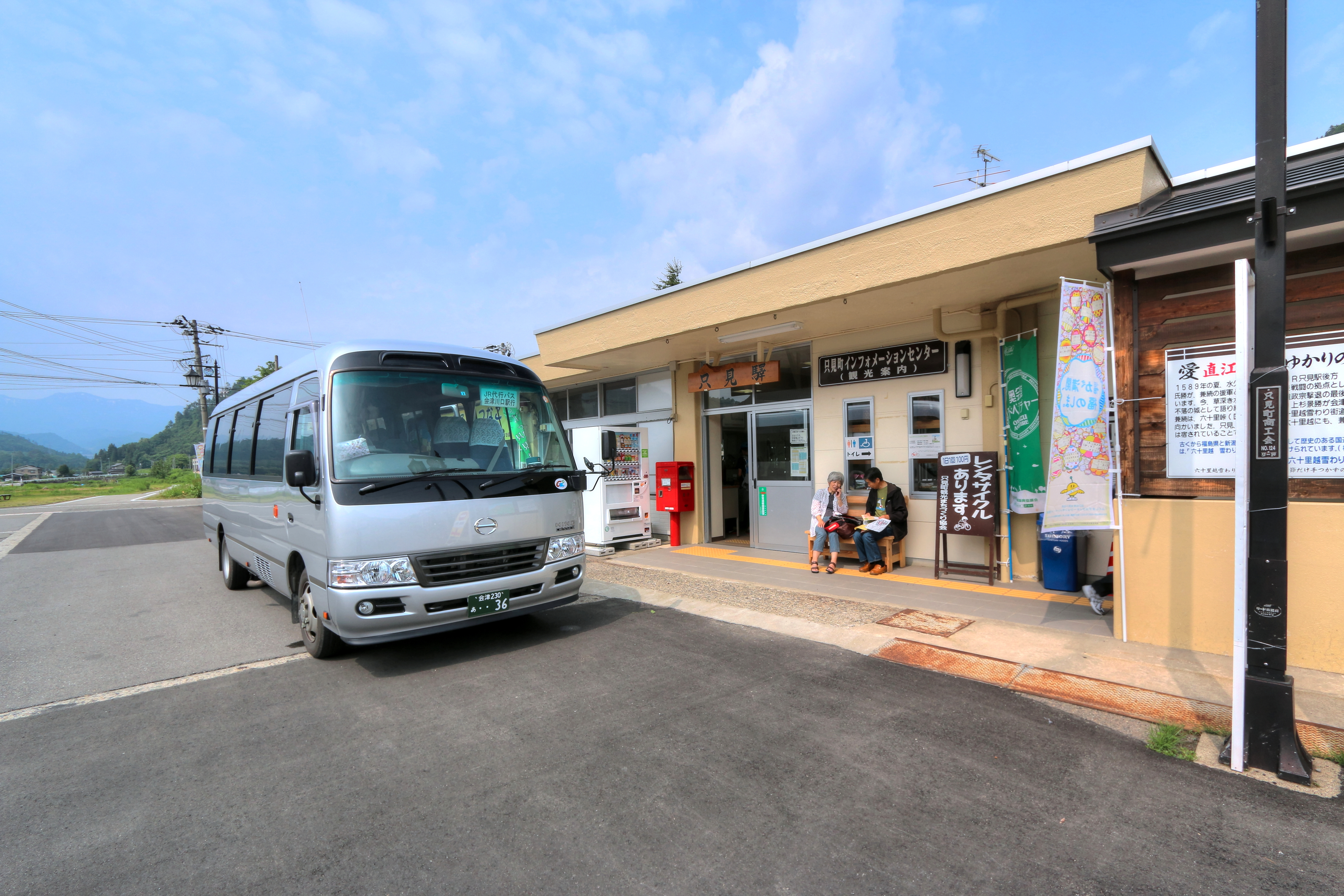
Minibus departure from Tadami Station, June 2014

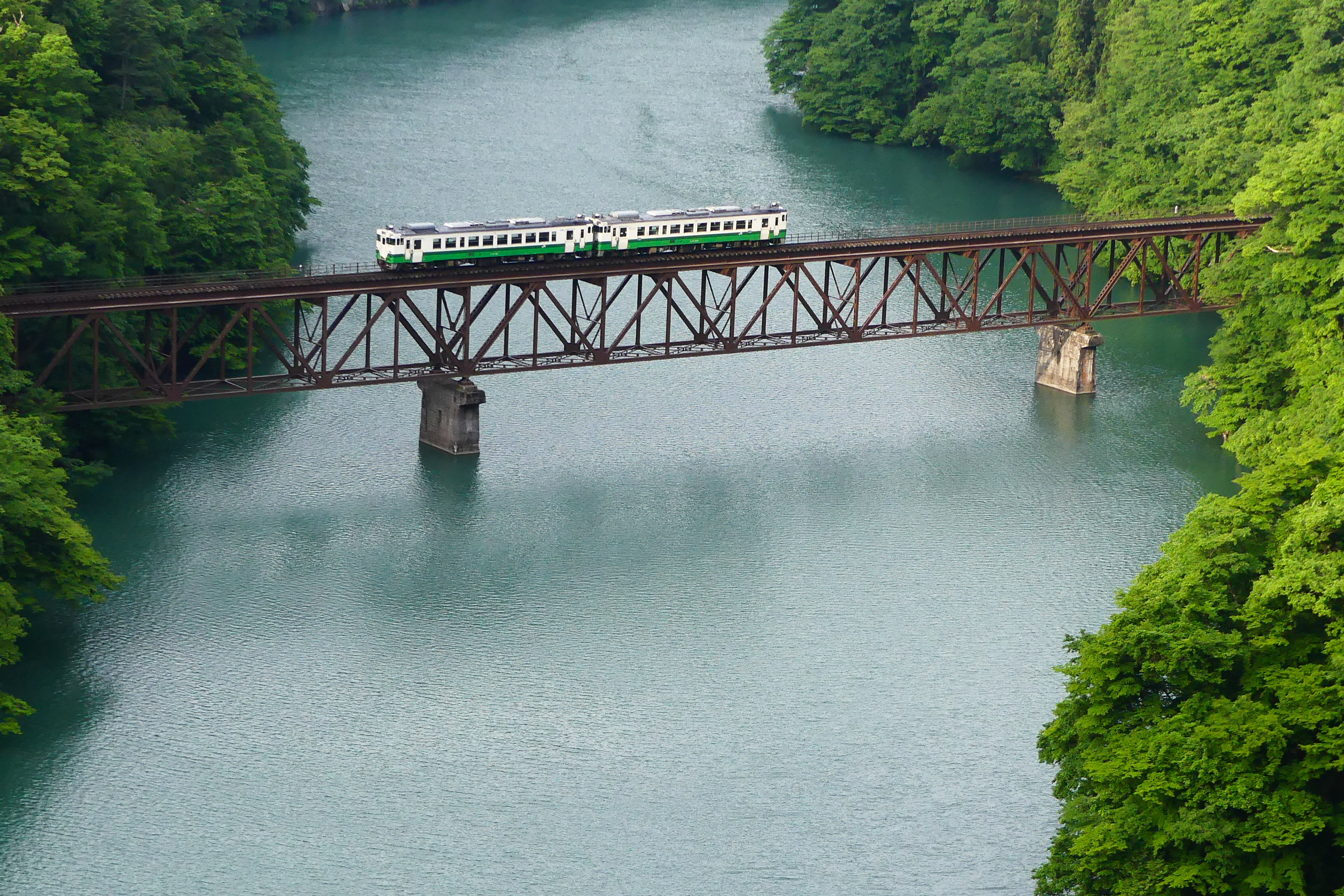
Tadamigawa Bridge No. 3

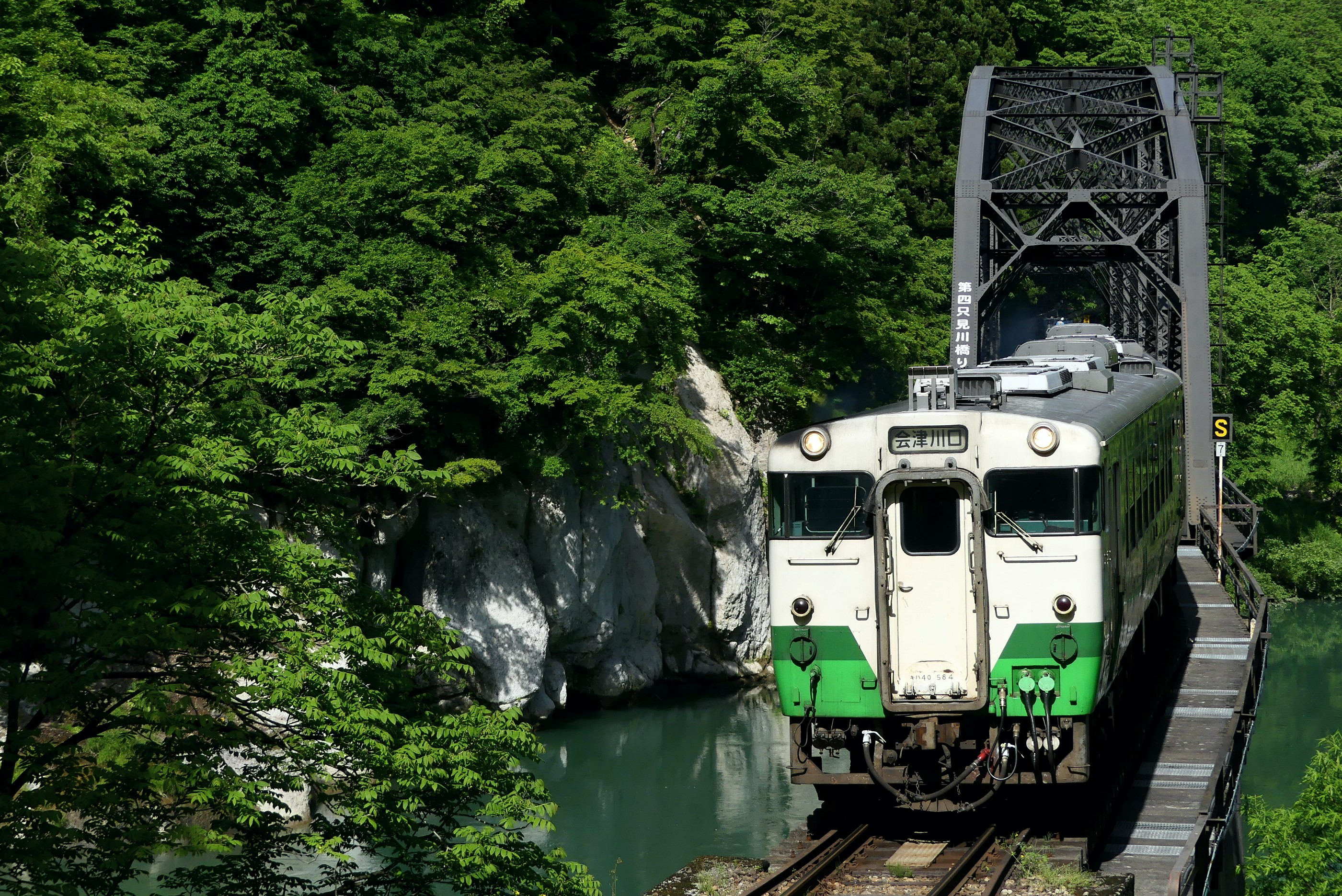
Tadamigawa Bridge No. 4

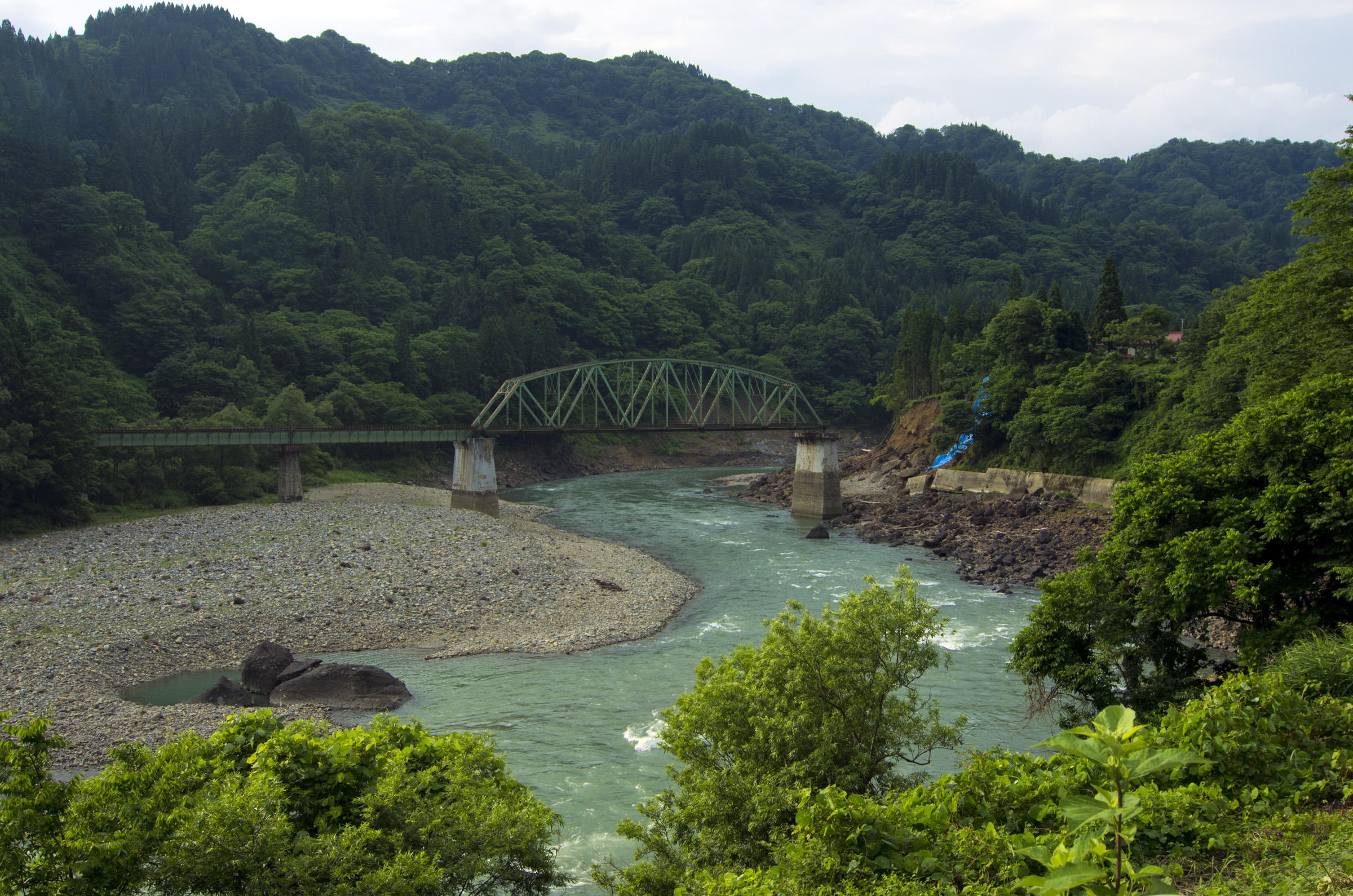
Tadamigawa Bridge No. 5

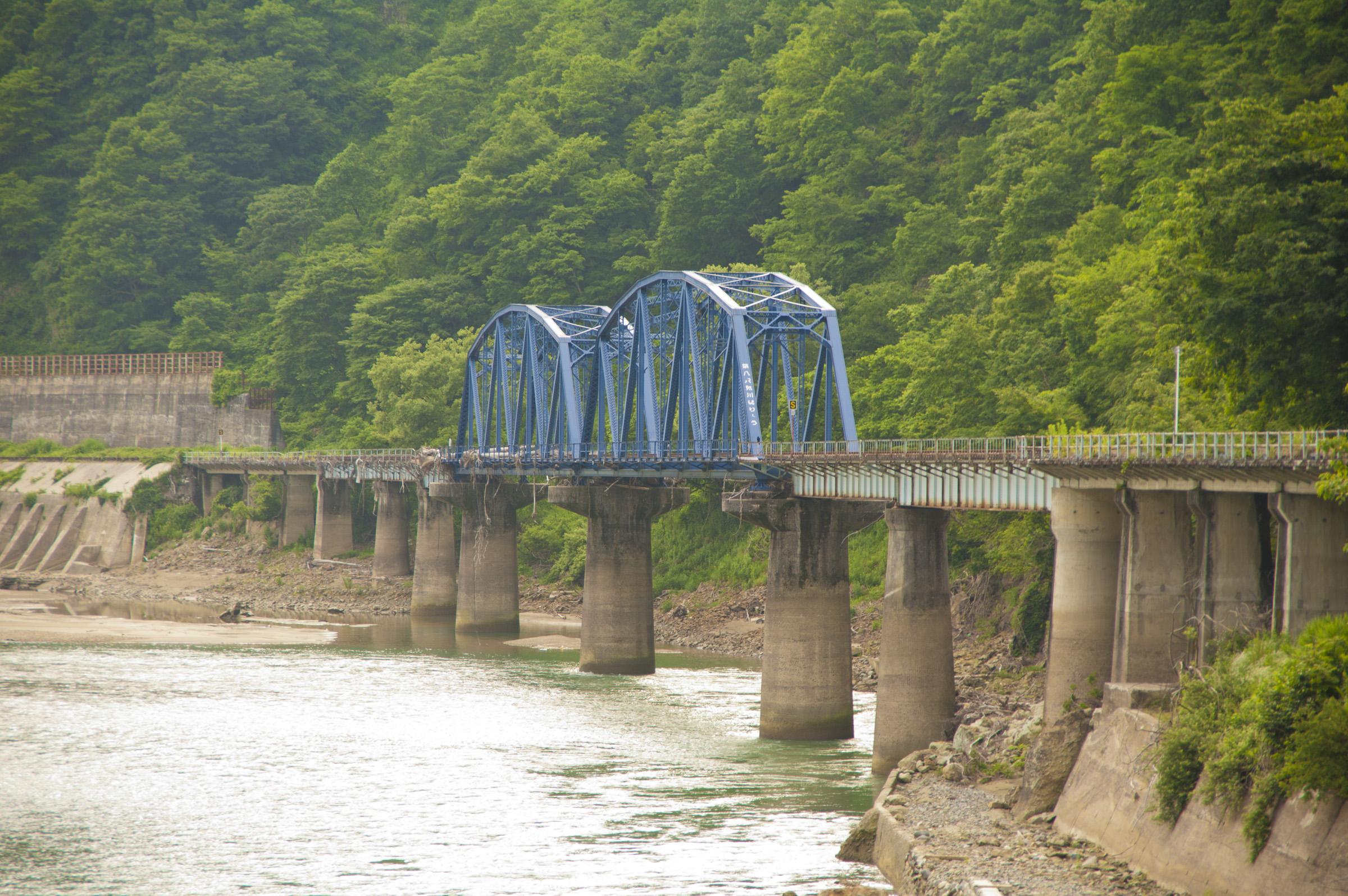
Tadamigawa Bridge No. 8

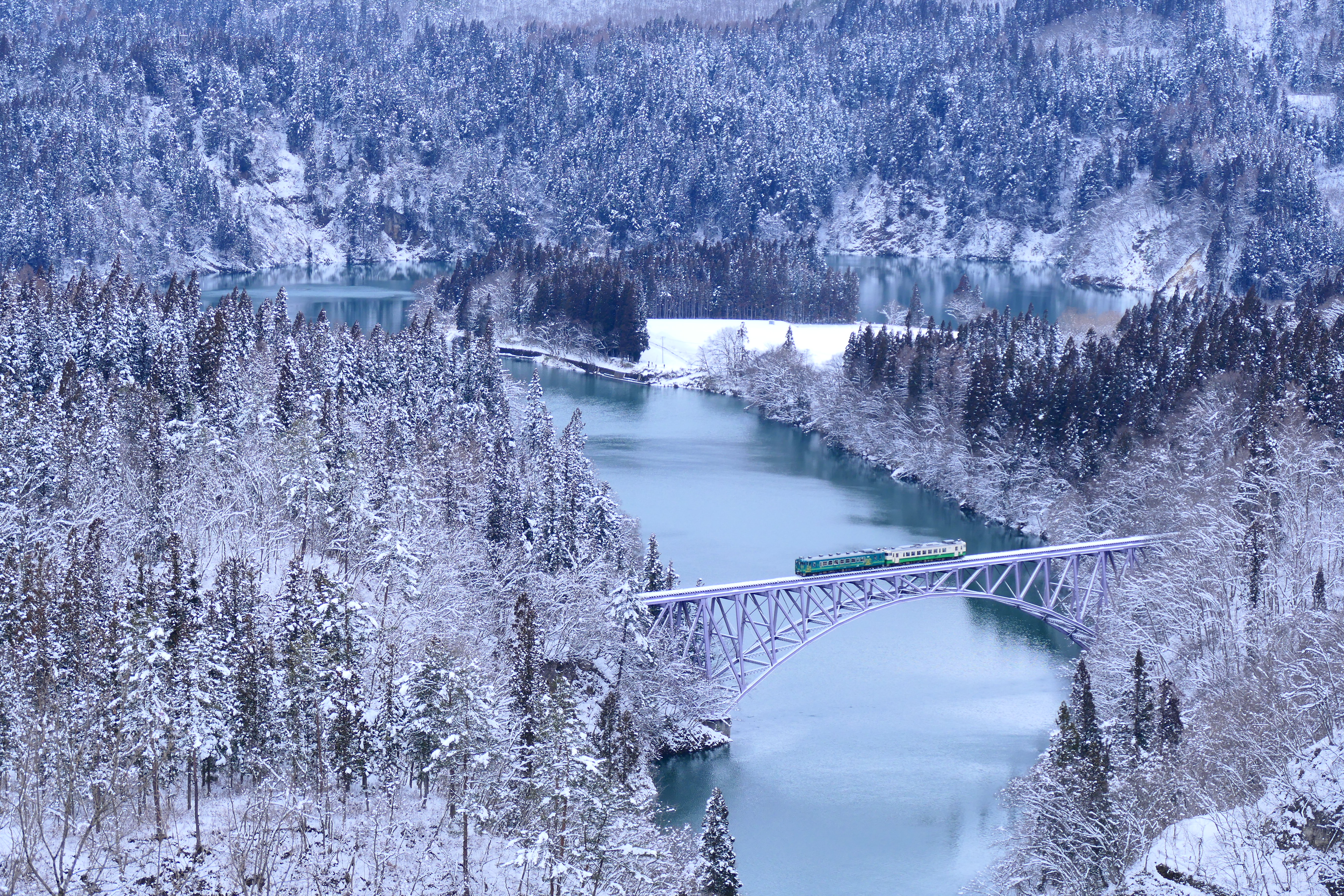
Tadamigawa Bridge No. 1 in winter
