= Irihirose Station =

Railway station in Uonuma, Niigata Prefecture, Japan

Coordinates: 37.3588°N 139.0660°E

Irihirose Station 入広瀬駅
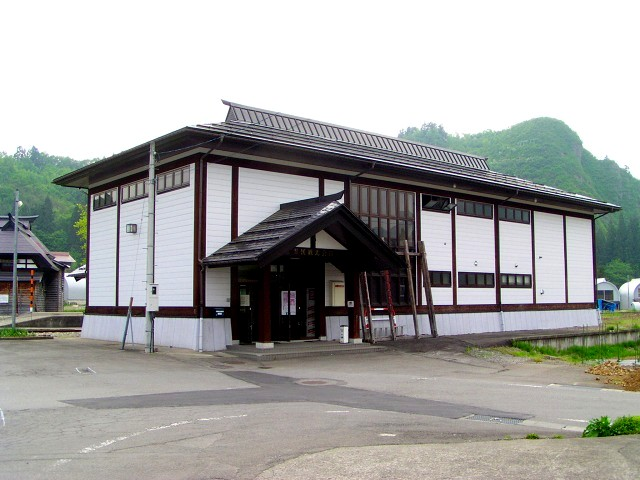
- Irihirose Station in May 2005

General information
- Location: Otochiyama, Uonuma-shi, Niigata-ken 946-0305; Japan
- Operator: JR East
- Line: ■ Tadami Line
- Platforms: 1 side platform
- Tracks: 1

Other information
- Website: www.jreast.co.jp/estation/station/info.aspx?StationCd=162

History
- Opened: 1 November 1942

Services
Preceding station	JR East	Following station
Kamijō towards Koide	Tadami Line	Ōshirakawa towards Aizu-Wakamatsu
Location
- Location within JR Tadami Line Location within Japan

Irihirose Station (入広瀬駅, Irihirose-eki) is a railway station in Uonuma, Niigata, Japan, operated by East Japan Railway Company (JR East).

== Lines ==
Irihirose Station is served by the Tadami Line, and is 115.6 kilometers from terminus of the line at Aizu-Wakamatsu.

== Station layout ==
The station consists of one ground-level side platform serving a single bi-directional track. The station is unattended.

== History ==
Irihirose Station opened on 1 November 1942, as an intermediate station on the initial western section of the Tadami Line between Koide and Ōshirakawa. Along with the rest of the Tadami Line, the station came under the ownership of the Japanese National Railways (JNR) in 1949, and was absorbed into the JR East network upon the privatization of the JNR on April 1, 1987.

Between 1951 and 2015, the next station to the east from Irihirose was Kakinoki. Since the closure of that station, trains now run non-stop to Ōshirakawa.

== Surrounding area ==
- former Irihirose village hall
- Japan National Route 252
- Irihirose Middle School
- Irihirose Elementary School

== See also ==
- List of railway stations in Japan
