= Aizu-Takada Station =

Railway station in Aizumisato, Fukushima Prefecture, Japan

Aizu-Takada Station 会津高田駅
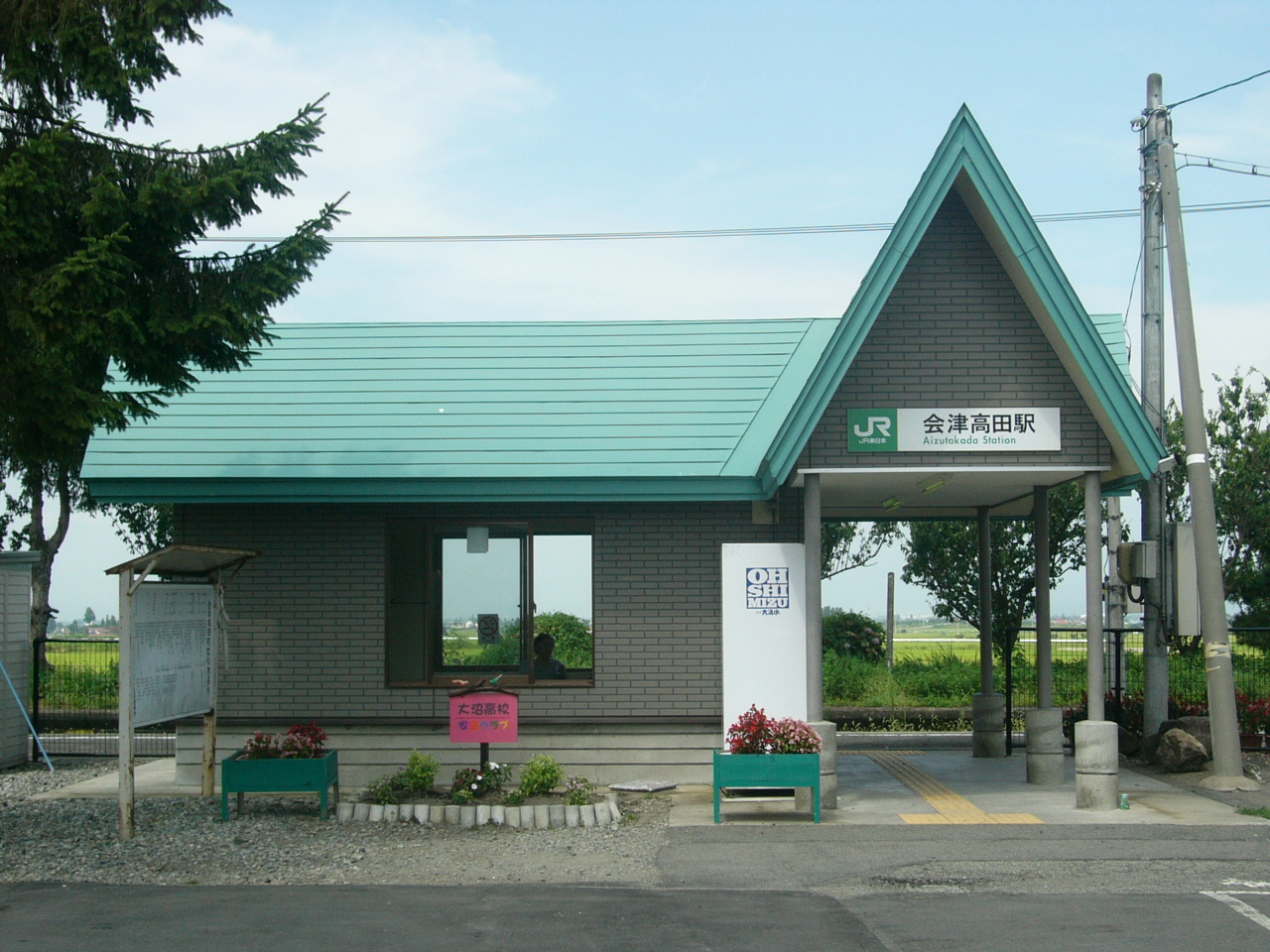
- Aizu-Takada Station in August 2006

General information
- Location: 2104 Kitaaizu-cho Kamiyonezuka, Aizumisato-machi, Ōnuma-gun, Fukushima-ken 969-6268; Japan
- Coordinates: 37.4709°N 139.8412°E
- Operator: JR East
- Line: ■ Tadami Line
- Distance: 11.3 km from Aizu-Wakamatsu
- Platforms: 1 side platform
- Tracks: 1

Other information
- Status: Unstaffed
- Website: Official website

History
- Opened: October 15, 1926

Services
Preceding station	JR East	Following station
Negishi towards Koide	Tadami Line	Aizu-Hongō towards Aizu-Wakamatsu
Location
- Location within JR Tadami Line Location within Fukushima Prefecture Location within Japan

Aizu-Takada Station (会津高田駅, Aizu-Takada-eki) is a railway station on the Tadami Line in the town of Aizumisato, Fukushima Prefecture, Japan, operated by East Japan Railway Company (JR East).

== Lines ==
Aizu-Takada Station is served by the Tadami Line, and is located 11.3 rail kilometers from the official starting point of the line at Aizu-Wakamatsu.

== Station layout ==
Aizu-Takada Station has one side platform serving a single bi-directional track. The station is unattended.

== History ==
Aizu-Takada Station opened on October 15, 1926, as an intermediate station on the initial eastern section of the Japanese National Railways (JNR) Tadami Line between Aizu-Wakamatsu and Aizu-Yanaizu. The station was absorbed into the JR East network upon the privatization of the JNR on April 1, 1987. A new station building was completed in January 2000.

== Surrounding area ==
- Isasumi Shrine
- former AizuTakada Town Hall
- Aizu-Misato Police Station
- Aizu Takada Post Office
- Onuma Prefectural High School
- National Route 401
- Fukushima Prefectural Route 22
- Fukushima Prefectural Route 53
- Fukushima Prefectural Route 130
- Fukushima Prefectural Route 152
- Fukushima Prefectural Route 220

== See also ==
- List of railway stations in Japan
