= Niitsuru Station =

Railway station in Aizumisato, Fukushima Prefecture, Japan

Coordinates: 37.5173°N 139.8287°E

Niitsuru Station 新鶴駅
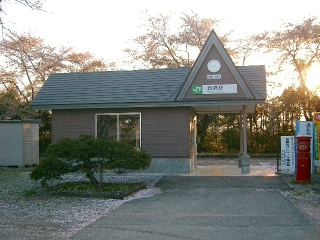
- Niitsuru Station in April 2006

General information
- Location: Tateishida, Aizumisato, Ōnuma, Fukushima （福島県大沼郡会津美里町立石田） Japan
- Operator: JR East
- Line: Tadami Line

History
- Opened: October 15, 1926

Services
Preceding station	JR East	Following station
Wakamiya towards Koide	Tadami Line	Negishi towards Aizu-Wakamatsu
Location
- Location within JR Tadami Line Location within Fukushima Prefecture Location within Japan

Niitsuru Station (新鶴駅, Niitsuru-eki) is a railway station on the Tadami Line in Aizumisato, Fukushima Prefecture, Japan, operated by East Japan Railway Company (JR East).

== Lines ==
Niitsuru Station is served by the Tadami Line, and is located 16.8 rail kilometers from the official starting point of the line at Aizu-Wakamatsu Station.

== Station layout ==
Niitsuru Station has a single side platform serving traffic in both directions. The station is unattended.

== History ==
Niitsuru Station opened on October 15, 1926, as an intermediate station on the initial eastern section of the Japanese National Railways (JNR) Tadami Line between Aizu-Wakamatsu and Aizu-Yanaizu. The station was absorbed into the JR East network upon the privatization of the JNR on April 1, 1987. A new station building was completed in March 2000.

== Surrounding area ==
- Aizu-Misato Elementary School
- Aizu-Misato Middle School
- Niitsuru Post Office
