= Kakinoki Station =

Former Railway station in Uonuma, Niigata Prefecture, Japan

Coordinates: 37.341°N 139.0895°E

Kakinoki Station 柿ノ木駅
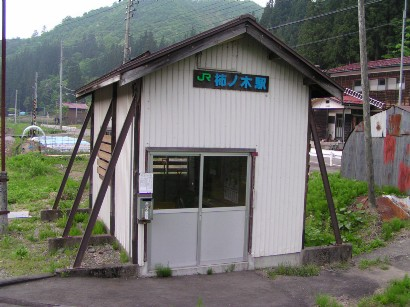
- The station in May 2005

General information
- Location: Anazawa, Uonuma-shi, Niigata-ken 946–0304; Japan
- Operator: ■ JR East
- Line: ■ Tadami Line
- Distance: 112.4 km from Aizu-Wakamatsu
- Platforms: 1 side platform
- Tracks: 1

Other information
- Status: Closed

History
- Opened: 1 March 1951
- Closed: 14 March 2015
Location

Kakinoki Station (柿ノ木駅, Kakinoki-eki) was a railway station on the Tadami Line in Uonuma, Niigata Prefecture, Japan, operated by East Japan Railway Company (JR East). It opened in 1951 as a temporary station, became a permanent station in 1987, and closed in March 2015. The nearest open stations are Irihirose to the west and Ōshirakawa to the east.

== History ==
The station opened on 1 March 1951, as a temporary intermediate station on the initial western section of the Japanese National Railways (JNR) Tadami Line between Koide and Ōshirakawa. With the privatization of JNR on 1 April 1987, it became a permanent station under the control of JR East. The station was closed from the start of the timetable revision introduced on 14 March 2015.

== See also ==
- List of railway stations in Japan
