= Ōshirakawa Station =

Railway station in Uonuma, Niigata Prefecture, Japan

Coordinates: 37.3415°N 139.1216°E

Ōshirakawa Station 大白川駅
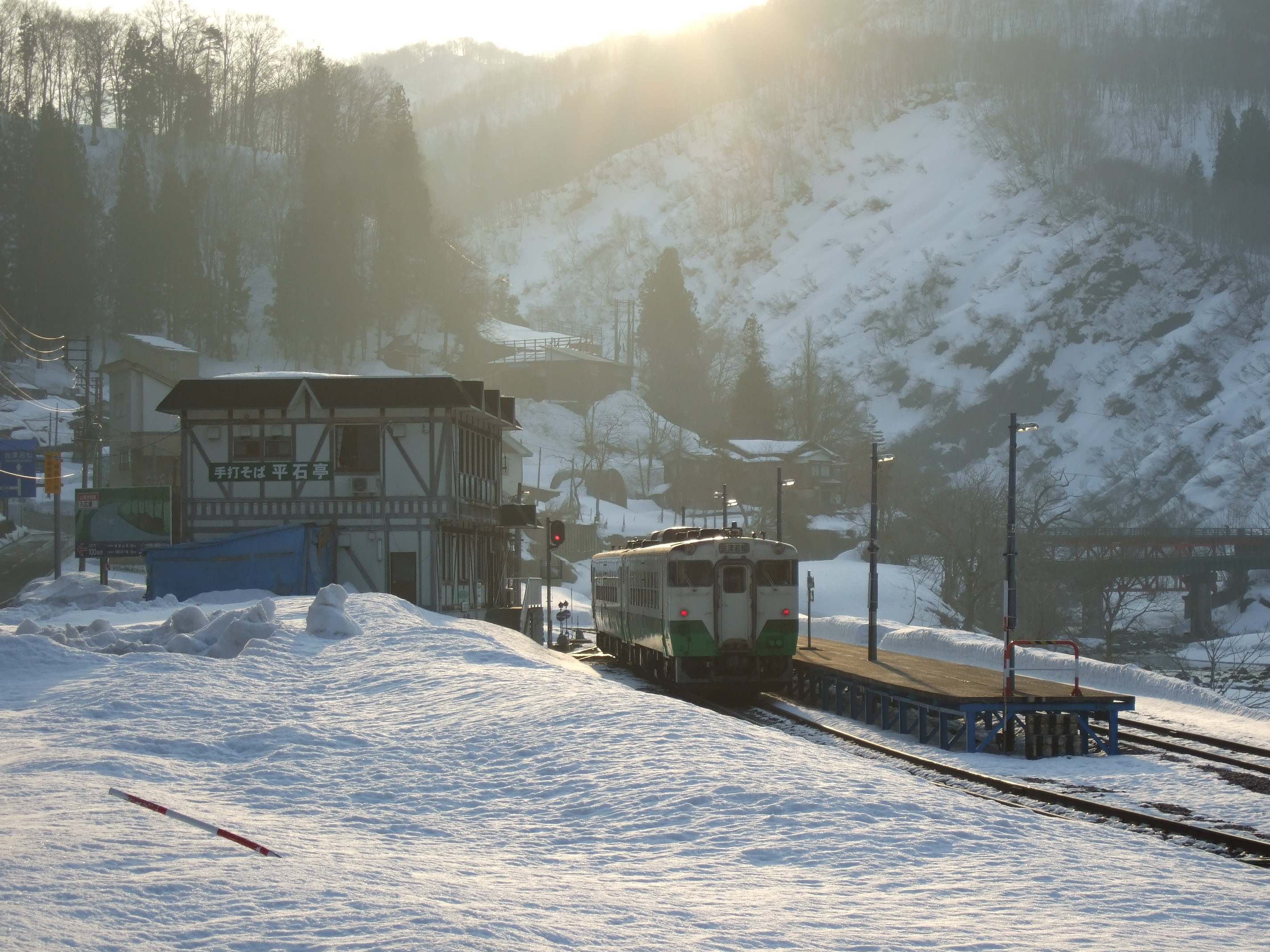
- Ōshirakawa Station in March 2007

General information
- Location: Ōshirakawa, Uonuma-shi, Niigata-ken; Japan
- Operator: JR East
- Line: ■ Tadami Line
- Platforms: 1 island platform
- Tracks: 2

Other information
- Website: www.jreast.co.jp/estation/station/info.aspx?StationCd=324

History
- Opened: 1 November 1942

Services
Preceding station	JR East	Following station
Irihirose towards Koide	Tadami Line	Tadami towards Aizu-Wakamatsu
Location
- Location within JR Tadami Line Location within Japan

Ōshirakawa Station (大白川駅, Ōshirakawa-eki) is a railway station in Uonuma, Niigata, Japan, operated by East Japan Railway Company (JR East).

== Lines ==
Ōshirakawa Station is served by the Tadami Line, and is 109.2 kilometers from the terminus of the line at Aizu-Wakamatsu.

== Station layout ==
The station consists of one ground-level island platform serving two tracks connected by a level crossing. The station is unattended.

== History ==
Ōshirakawa Station opened on 1 November 1942, as the terminus of the western section of the Tadami Line from Koide. In 1971, the line was extended from Oshirakawa to Tadami, thus joining the previously disconnected western and eastern sections of the Tadami Line. Along with the rest of the Tadami Line, the station came under the ownership of the Japanese National Railways (JNR) in 1949, and was absorbed into the JR East network upon the privatization of the JNR on April 1, 1987.

Between 1951 and 2015, the next station to the west from Ōshirakawa was Kakinoki. Since the closure of that station, trains now run non-stop to Irihirose.

== Surrounding area ==
- Ōshirakawa Post Office
- Japan National Route 252

== See also ==
- List of railway stations in Japan
