= Aizu-Kawaguchi Station =

Railway station in Kaneyama, Fukushima Prefecture, Japan

Aizu-Kawaguchi Station 会津川口駅
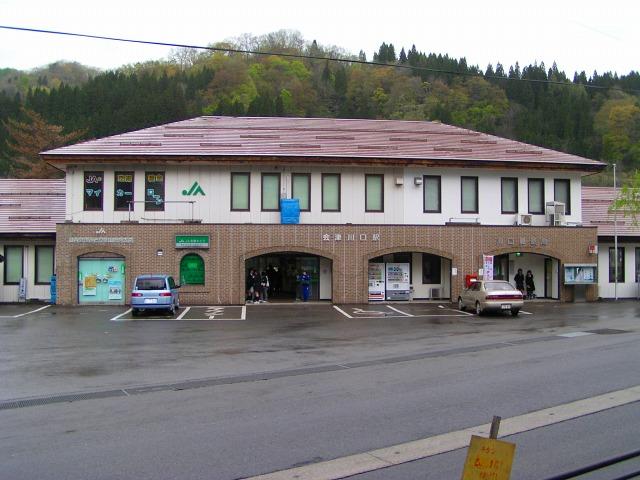
- Aizu-Kawaguchi Station in May 2005

General information
- Location: 508 Kawaguchi Mori-no-ue, Kaneyama-machi, Ōnuma-gun, Fukushima-ken 968-0011; Japan
- Coordinates: 37.4550°N 139.5237°E
- Operator: JR East
- Line: ■ Tadami Line
- Platforms: 1 island platform
- Tracks: 12

Other information
- Status: Staffed
- Website: Official website

History
- Opened: September 20, 1956

Passengers
- FY2017: 57 daily

Services
Preceding station	JR East	Following station
Honna towards Koide	Tadami Line	Aizu-Nakagawa towards Aizu-Wakamatsu
Location
- Location within JR Tadami Line Location within Fukushima Prefecture Location within Japan

Aizu-Kawaguchi Station (会津川口駅, Aizu-Kawaguchi-eki) is a railway station on the Tadami Line in the town of Kaneyama, Ōnuma District, Fukushima Prefecture, Japan, operated by East Japan Railway Company (JR East).

== Lines ==
Aizu-Kawaguchi Station is served by the Tadami Line, and is located 60.8 kilometers from the official starting point of the line at Aizu-Wakamatsu.

== Station layout ==
Aizu-Kawaguchi Station has a single island platform connected to the station building by a level crossing. The station is staffed.

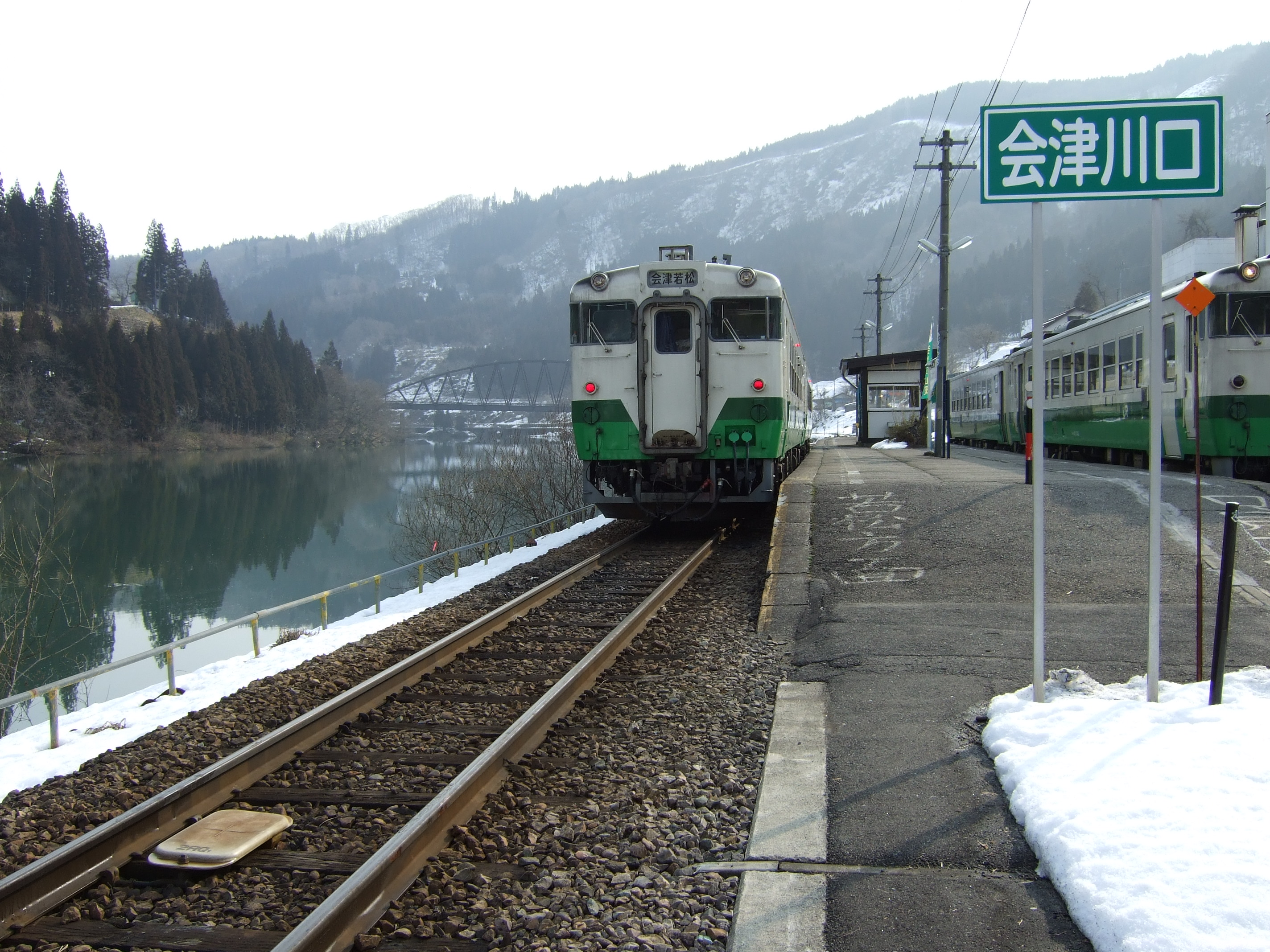
Platform (March 2007)

=== Platforms ===
1	■ Tadami Line	for Tadami and Koide for Aizu-Miyashita, Aizu-Bange and Aizu-Wakamatsu
2	■ Tadami Line	for Aizu-Miyashita, Aizu-Bange and Aizu-Wakamatsu

== History ==
Aizu-Kawaguchi Station opened on September 20, 1956, as the terminus of an extension of the eastern section of the Tadami Line from the previous terminus at Aizu-Miyashita. In 1963, the line was extended from Aizu-Kawaguchi to a new terminus at Tadami. The station was absorbed into the JR East network upon the privatization of the Japanese National Railways (JNR) on April 1, 1987.

Due to damage caused by torrential rainfall on July 30, 2011, services between Aizu-Kawaguchi and Tadami stations were replaced by a provisional bus service. The closed section resumed operations on 1 October 2022.

== Passenger statistics ==
In fiscal 2017, the station was used by an average of 57 passengers daily (boarding passengers only).

== Surrounding area ==
- Numazawa Lake
- Kaneyama Town Hall
- Kawaguchi Post Office
- Tadami River
- National Route 252
- National Route 400

== Bus routes ==
- Aizu Bus
  - For Oashi via Showa Onsen

== See also ==
- List of railway stations in Japan
