= Aizu-Kosugawa Station =

Railway station in Tadami, Fukushima Prefecture, Japan

Aizu-Kosugawa Station 会津越川駅
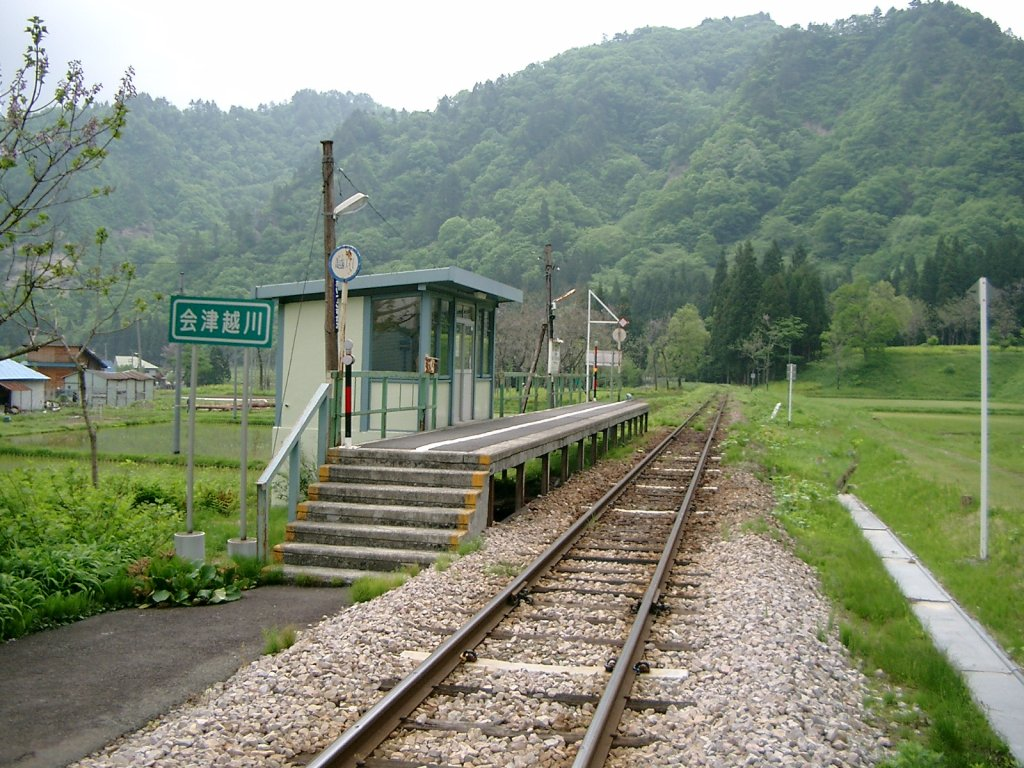
- Aizu-Kosugawa Station in May 2006

General information
- Location: Kosugawa Nakayashiki, Kaneyama-machi, Ōnuma-gun, Fukushima-ken 968-0321; Japan
- Coordinates: 37.3986°N 139.4695°E
- Operator: JR East
- Line: ■ Tadami Line
- Distance: 70.0 km from Aizu-Wakamatsu
- Platforms: 1 side platform
- Tracks: 1

Other information
- Status: Unstaffed
- Website: Official website

History
- Opened: 1 February 1965

Services
Preceding station	JR East	Following station
Aizu-Yokota towards Koide	Tadami Line	Honna towards Aizu-Wakamatsu
Location
- Location within JR Tadami Line Location within Fukushima Prefecture Location within Japan

Aizu-Kosugawa Station (会津越川駅, Aizu-Kosugawa-eki) is a railway station on the Tadami Line in the town of Kaneyama, Ōnuma District, Fukushima Prefecture, Japan, operated by East Japan Railway Company (JR East).

== Lines ==
Aizu-Kosugawa Station is served by the Tadami Line, and is located 70.0 kilometers from the official starting point of the line at Aizu-Wakamatsu.

== Station layout ==
Aizu-Kosugawa Station has one side platform serving a single bi-directional track. The platform is very short and can only accommodate a single carriage. The station is unattended.

== History ==
Aizu-Kosugawa Station opened on February 1, 1965, as an intermediate station on the extension of eastern section of the Japanese National Railways (JNR) Tadami Line between Aizu-Kawaguchi and Tadami. The station was absorbed into the JR East network upon the privatization of the JNR on April 1, 1987.

Due to damage caused by torrential rainfall on July 30, 2011, services on the section of line between Aizu-Kawaguchi and Tadami, which includes this station were replaced by a provisional bus service. The closed section resumed operations on 1 October 2022.

== Surrounding area ==
- National Route 252
- Tadami River
- Yokota Post Office

== See also ==
- List of railway stations in Japan
