= JNR Class C58 =

Class of 427 Japanese 2-6-2 locomotives

Class C58
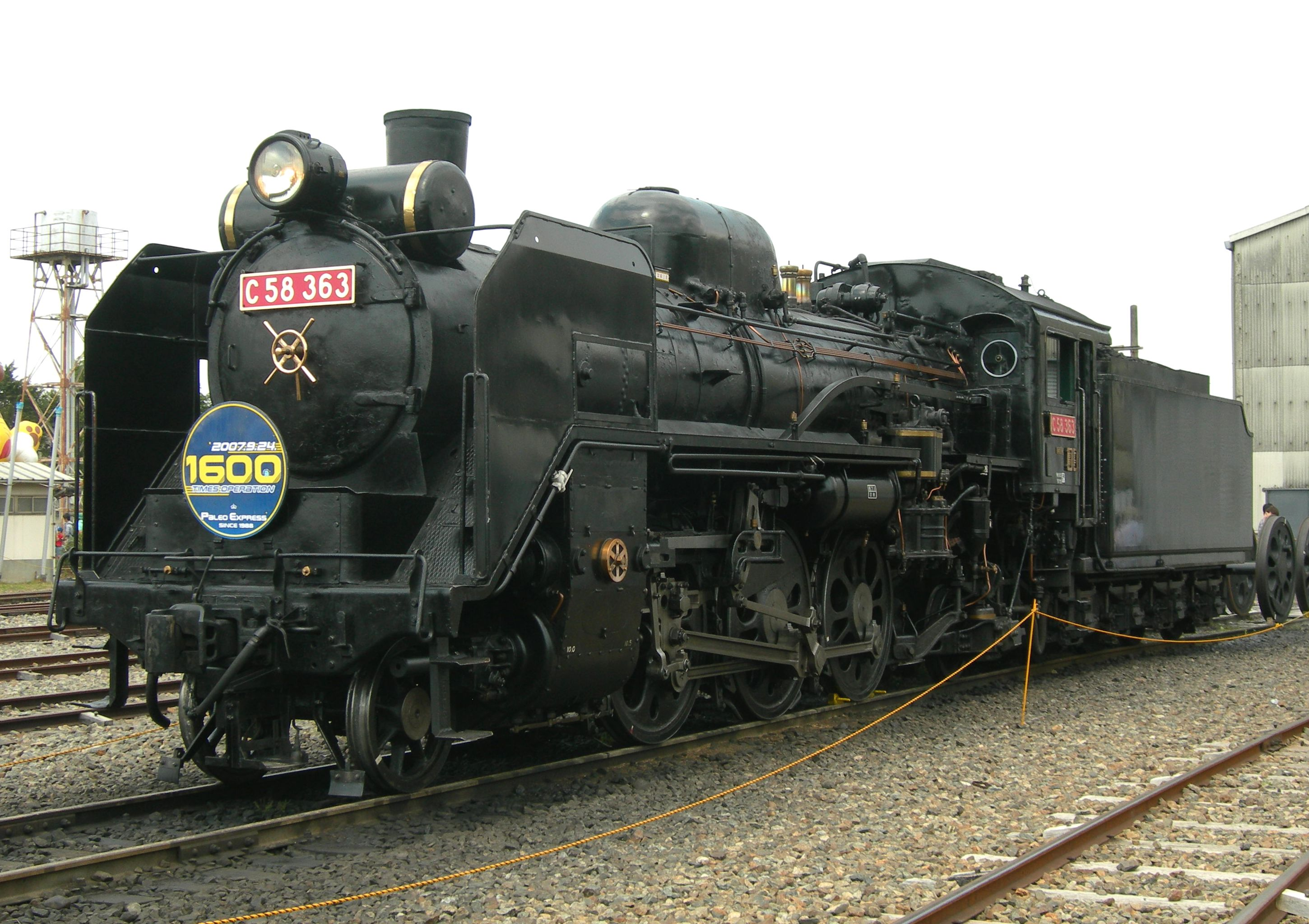
- C58 363 operated by the Chichibu Railway
Type and origin
- Power type: Steam
- Builder: Kawasaki Heavy Industries Rolling Stock Company, Kisha Seizō
- Build date: 1938–1947
- Total produced: 427
Specifications
- Configuration
  - Whyte: 2-6-2 Prairie
- Gauge: 1,067 mm (3 ft 6 in); 1,000 mm (3 ft 3 3/8 in) metre gauge (FMSR, SRT)
- Driver dia.: 1,520 mm (5 ft 0 in)
- Length: 18,275 mm (59 ft 11.5 in)
- Total weight: 100.20 t (98.62 long tons; 110.45 short tons)
- Valve gear: Walschaerts
Performance figures
- Maximum speed: 85 km/h (53 mph)
- Tractive effort: 12,570 kgf (123.3 kN; 27,700 lbf)
Career
- Operators: Japanese Government Railways, Japanese National Railways; JR East; Chichibu Railway; Federated Malay States Railways; State Railway of Thailand
- Numbers: C58 1-C58 427
- Nicknames: Shigohachi
- Retired: 1973
- Preserved: 49
- Disposition: 49 preserved (2 operational), remainder scrapped

The Class C58 is a 2-6-2 wheel arrangement steam locomotive type built by the Japanese Government Railways (JGR) and Japanese National Railways (JNR) from 1938 to 1947. They were dual-service or mixed traffic locomotives, optimized for both passenger and freight trains. A total of 427 Class C58 locomotives were built and designed by Hideo Shima. Two members of the class are preserved in working order.

== Preserved examples ==
Over fifty Class C58s were preserved; C58 239 and C58 363 are operational among them.

=== Operational ===
- C58 239: Built June 1940, withdrawn 22 May 1972, preserved from 1 May 1973 in a park in Morioka, Iwate. Restored to working order by JR East and used on steam excursions as the SL Ginga Joyful Train in northeastern Japan from 12 April 2014 until 11 June 2023. As of 2026, it is still operational with an uncertain future, currently confined within Morioka depot.
- C58 363: Chichibu Railway, used on Paleo Express steam services

=== Static ===
- C58 1: At the Umekoji Steam Locomotive Museum in Kyoto
- C58 5: At "Tochinoki Family Land" in Utsunomiya, Tochigi
- C58 12: In a park in Takamatsu, Kagawa
- C58 16: In a park in Minamisanriku, Miyagi (overturned by 11 March 2011 tsunami and dismantled on site in 2012)
- C58 19: In a park in Ōsaki, Miyagi
- C58 33: In a park in Kiyosato, Hokkaido

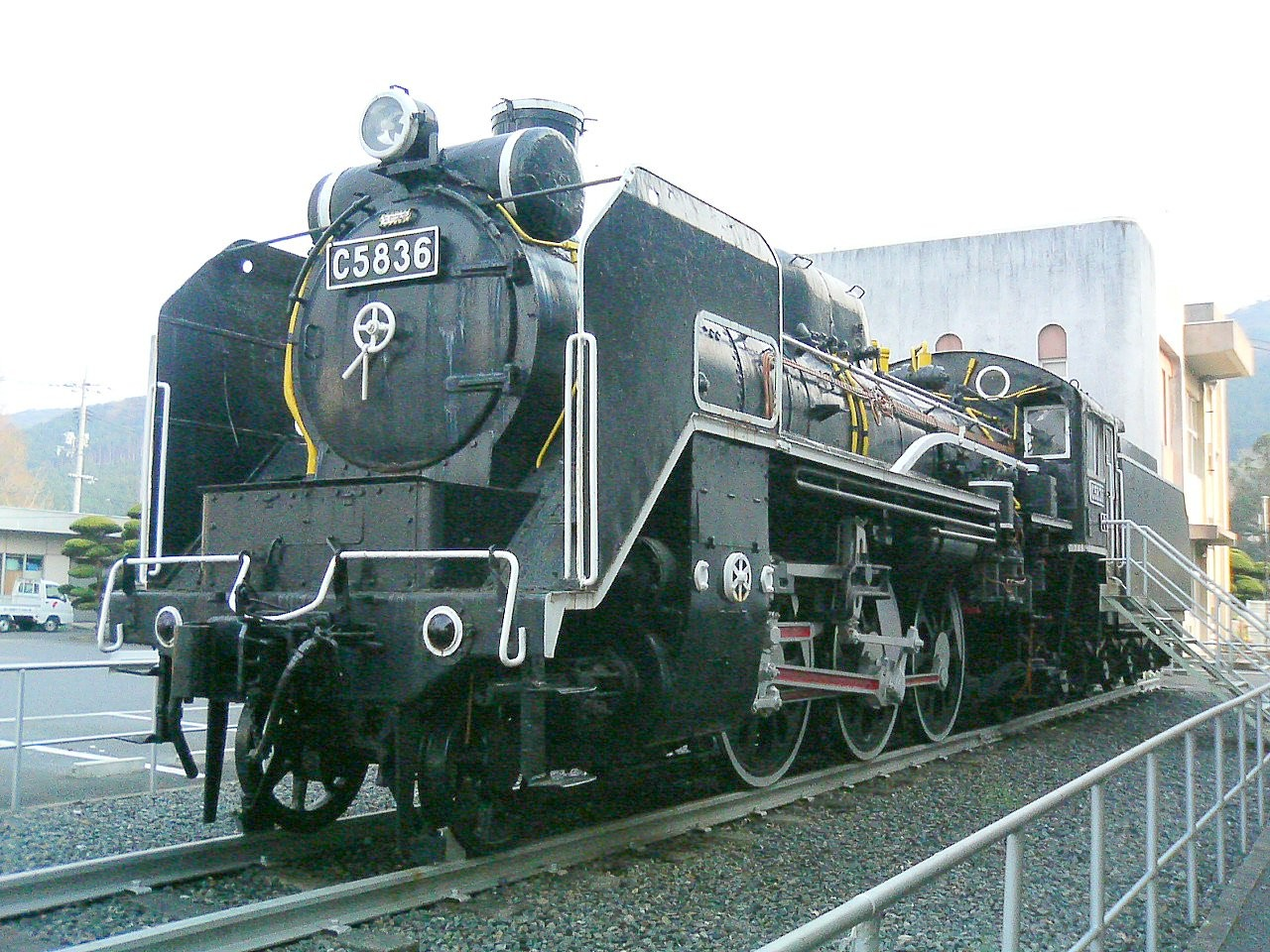
C58 36, April 2007

- C58 36: At the municipal library in Mine, Yamaguchi
- C58 48: Torokko Saga Station "19th Century Hall" in Kyoto
- C58 49: In a park in Kakegawa, Shizuoka
- C58 51: In a park in Matsusaka, Mie
- C58 56: At "Poppo Land No. 2" in Fukuchiyama, Kyoto
- C58 66: In "Park Goryo" in Osaka
- C58 82: At a sports centre in Bihoro, Hokkaido
- C58 98: In a park in Fukagawa, Hokkaido
- C58 103: At a culture centre in Ichinoseki, Iwate
- C58 106: In a park in Kushiro, Hokkaido
- C58 112: In a park in Shibushi, Kagoshima
- C58 113: In Maizuru, Kyoto

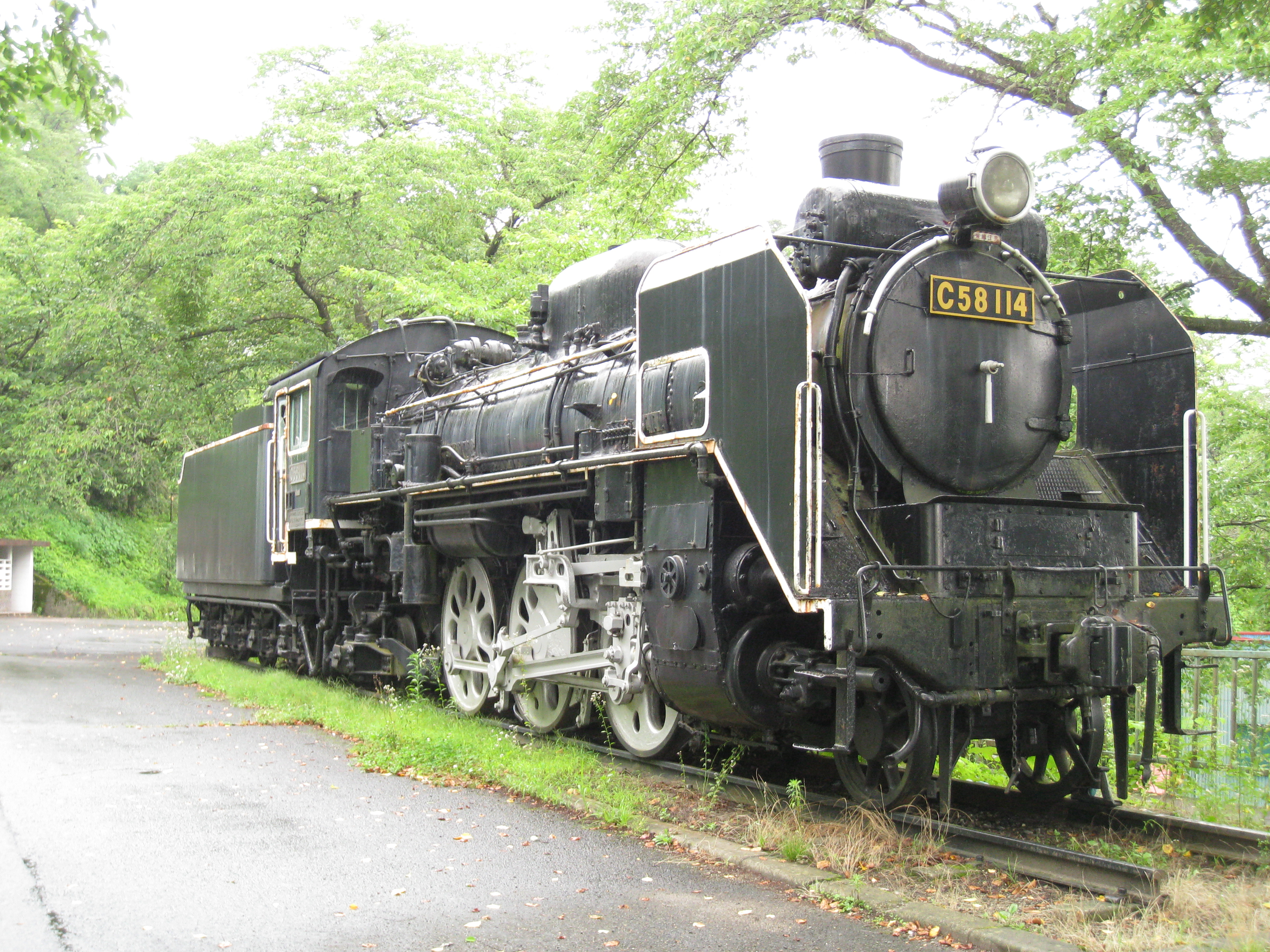
C58 114, July 2009

- C58 114: In a park in Ōsaki, Miyagi
- C58 119: In "SL Park" in Kitami, Hokkaido
- C58 139: In a park in Yūbetsu, Hokkaidō

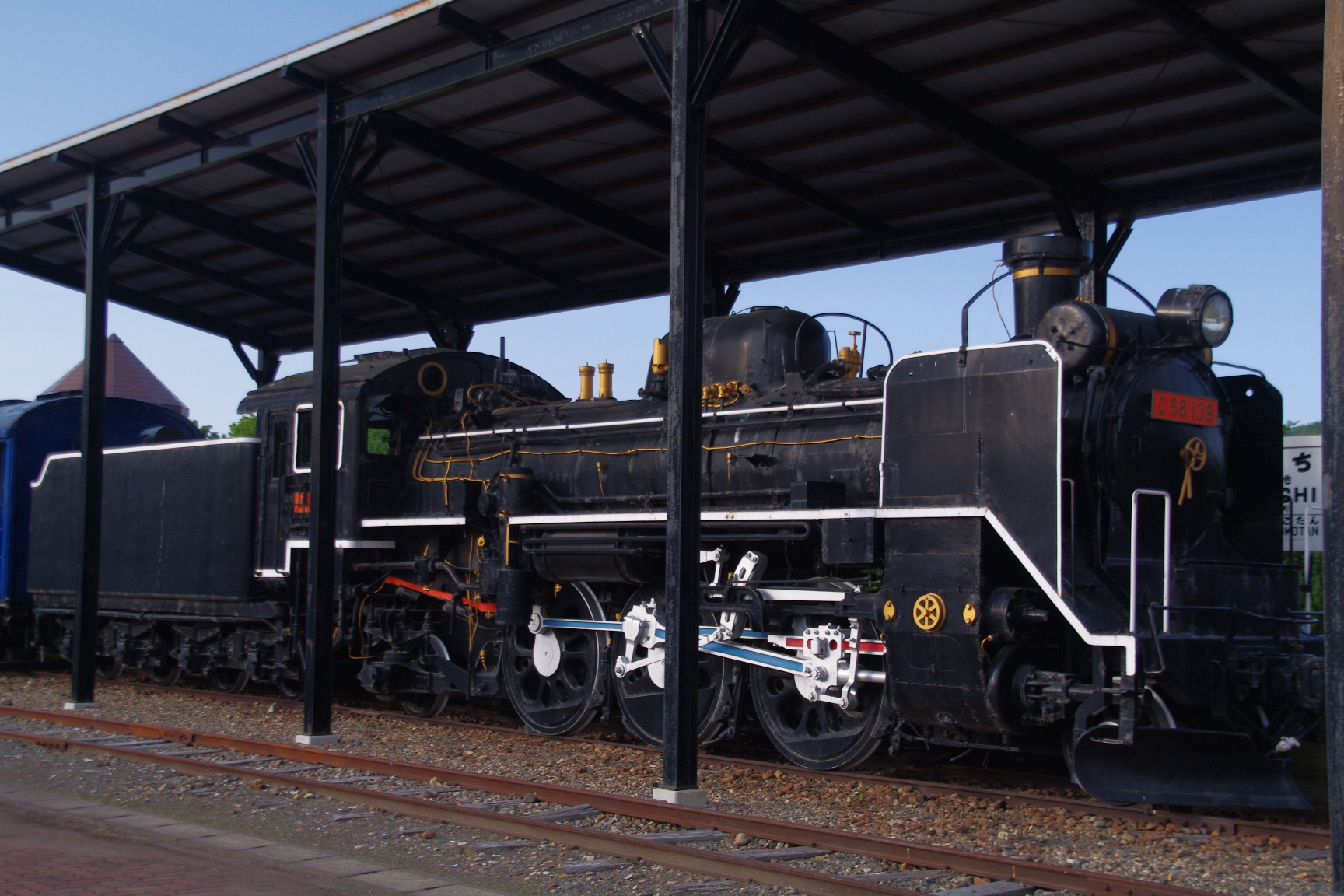
C58 139, August 2009

- C58 170: At the Hidaka Elementary School in Toyooka, Hyogo
- C58 171: In a park in Obama, Fukui
- C58 212: In a park in Tsuruga, Fukui
- C58 215: At Bange Elementary School in Aizubange, Fukushima
- C58 217: In a park in Asahi, Chiba
- C58 228: In a park in Ishinomaki, Miyagi
- C58 231: In a park in Kaminoyama, Yamagata
- C58 244: At the development centre in Tadami, Fukushima

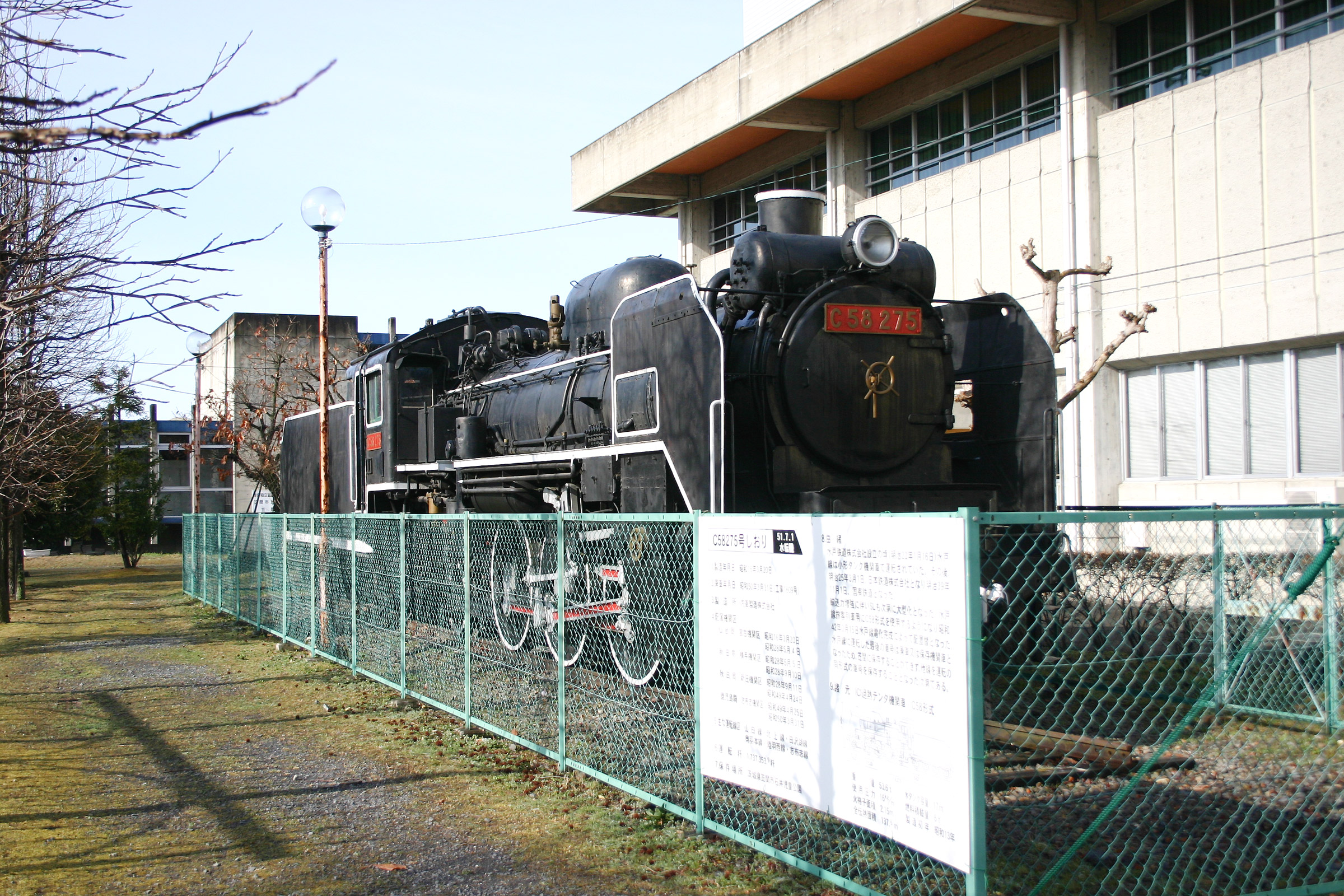
C58 275, March 2004

- C58 275: In a park in Kasama, Ibaraki
- C58 277: In a park in Kobayashi, Miyazaki
- C58 280: At an elementary school in Minokamo, Gifu
- C58 295: In a park in Sakaide, Kagawa
- C58 304: In a park in Shinjo, Yamagata
- C58 322: In Mishima, Shizuoka

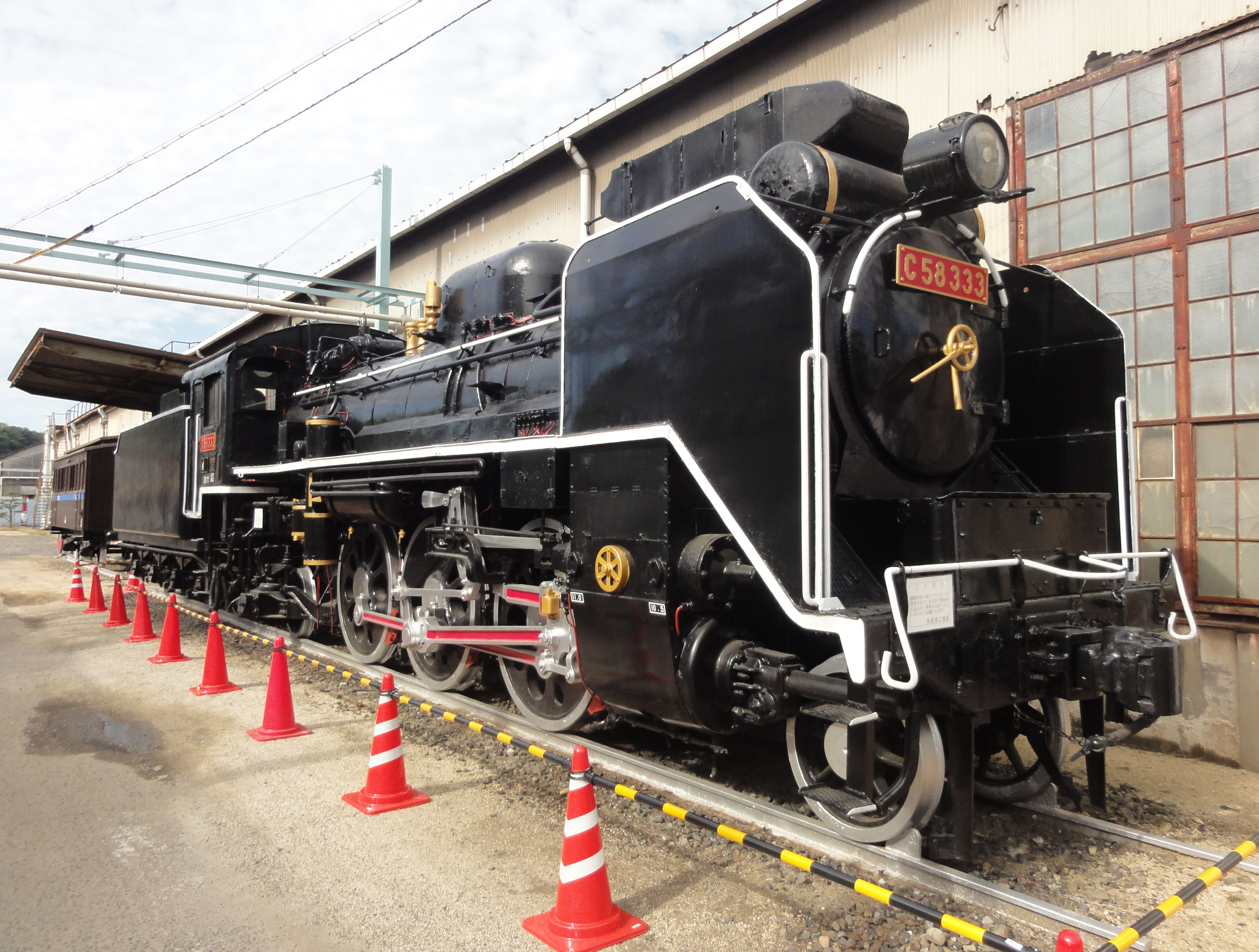
C58 333, October 2012

- C58 333: At JR Shikoku Tadotsu Works in Tadotsu, Kagawa
- C58 335: In Kōchi, Kōchi
- C58 342: In a park in Kitakami, Iwate
- C58 353: In a park in Nachikatsuura, Wakayama
- C58 354: In a park in Rifu, Miyagi
- C58 356: In front of Nakayamadaira-Onsen Station in Ōsaki, Miyagi
- C58 359: In Kameyama Park in Kameyama, Mie
- C58 365: At the Shinkansen General Rolling Stock Centre in Rifu, Miyagi
- C58 389: In front of Tenryū-Futamata Station in Hamamatsu, Shizuoka

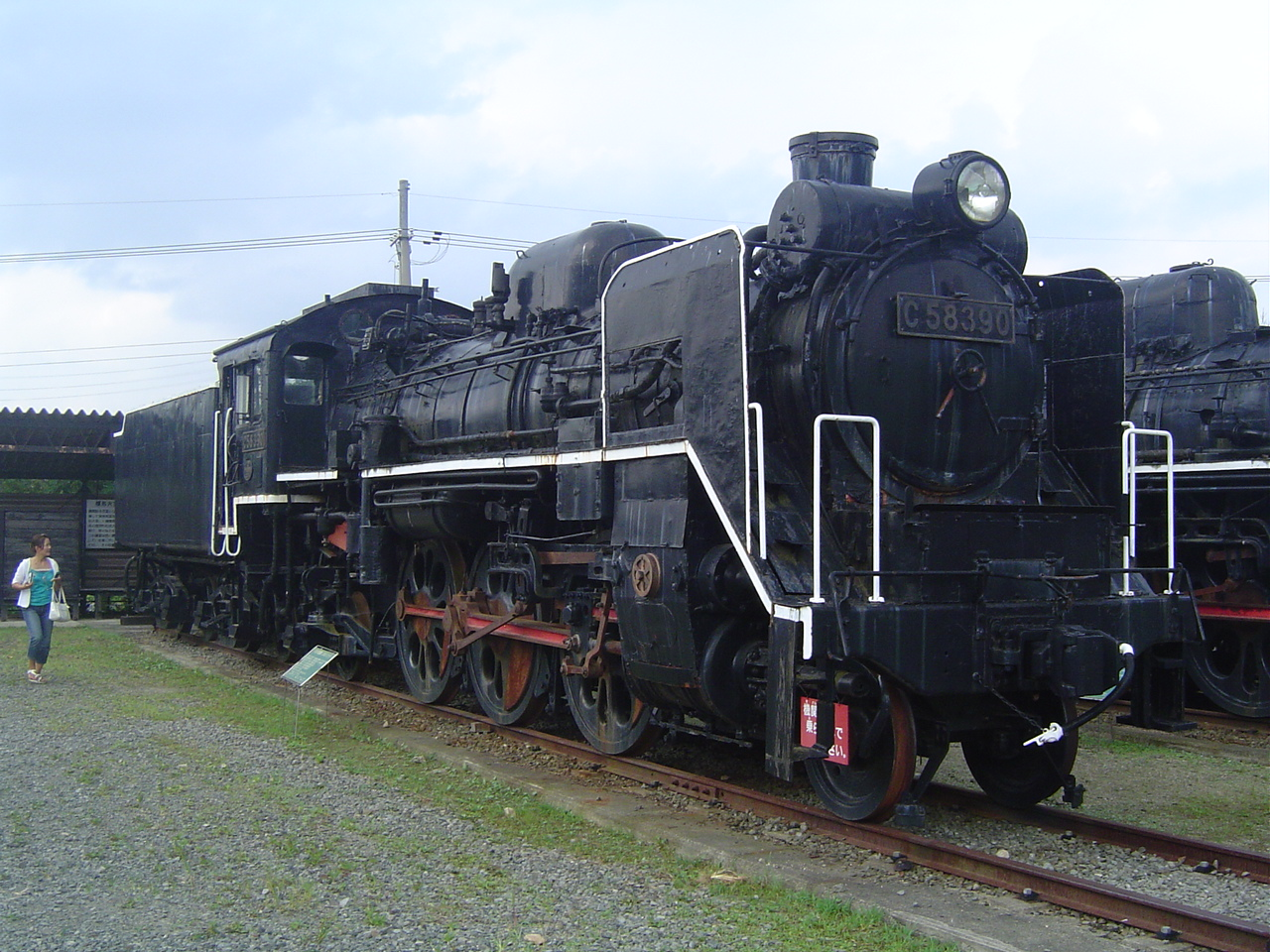
C58 390, August 2005

- C58 390: In "Kaya SL Park" in Yosano, Kyoto
- C58 395: In Hamura Zoo in Hamura, Tokyo
- C58 407: In Otsukadai Park in Toshima, Tokyo
- C58 414: In a park in Tamaki, Mie

== In popular culture ==
- The locomotive is featured prominently in the Love Live! Sunshine!! animated music video "HAPPY PARTY TRAIN"

== See also ==
- Japan Railways locomotive numbering and classification
- List of operational steam locomotives in Japan
- JNR Class C12
- JNR Class C63
