= Aizu-Shiozawa Station =

Railway station in Tadami, Fukushima Prefecture, Japan

Aizu-Shiozawa Station 会津塩沢駅
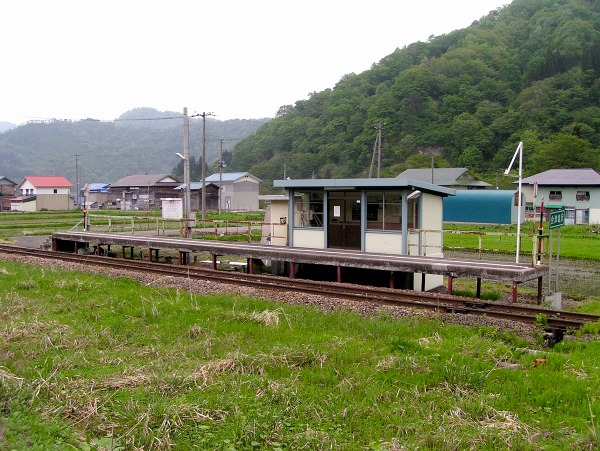
- Aizu-Shiozawa Station in May 2006

General information
- Location: Shiozawa, Tadami-machi, Minamiaizu-gun, Fukushima-ken 968-0411; Japan
- Coordinates: 37.3934°N 139.3551°E
- Operator: JR East
- Line: ■ Tadami Line
- Distance: 80.9 km from Aizu-Wakamatsu
- Platforms: 1 side platform
- Tracks: 1

Other information
- Status: Unstaffed
- Website: Official website

History
- Opened: February 1, 1965

Services
Preceding station	JR East	Following station
Aizu-Gamō towards Koide	Tadami Line	Aizu-Ōshio towards Aizu-Wakamatsu
Location
- Location within JR Tadami Line Location within Japan

Aizu-Shiozawa Station (会津塩沢駅, Aizu-Shiozawa-eki) is a railway station on the Tadami Line in the town of Tadami, Minamiaizu District, Fukushima Prefecture, Japan, operated by East Japan Railway Company (JR East).

== Lines ==
Aizu-Shiozawa Station is served by the Tadami Line, and is located 80.9 rail kilometers from the official starting point of the line at Aizu-Wakamatsu.

== Station layout ==
Aizu-Shiozawa Station has one side platform serving a single bi-directional track. The platform is very short and can only accommodate a single carriage. The station is unattended.

== History ==
Aizu-Shiozawa Station was opened by the Japanese National Railways (JNR) on February 1, 1965, as an intermediate station on the extension of eastern section of the Tadami Line between Aizu-Kawaguchi and Tadami. The station was absorbed into the JR East network upon the privatization of the JNR on April 1, 1987.

Due to damage caused by torrential rainfall on July 30, 2011, services on the section of line between Aizu-Kawaguchi and Tadami, which includes this station were replaced by a provisional bus service. The closed section resumed operations on 1 October 2022.

== Surrounding area ==
- National Route 252
- Tadami River

== See also ==
- List of railway stations in Japan
