= Aizu-Ōshio Station =

Railway station in Tadami, Fukushima Prefecture, Japan

Aizu-Ōshio Station 会津大塩駅
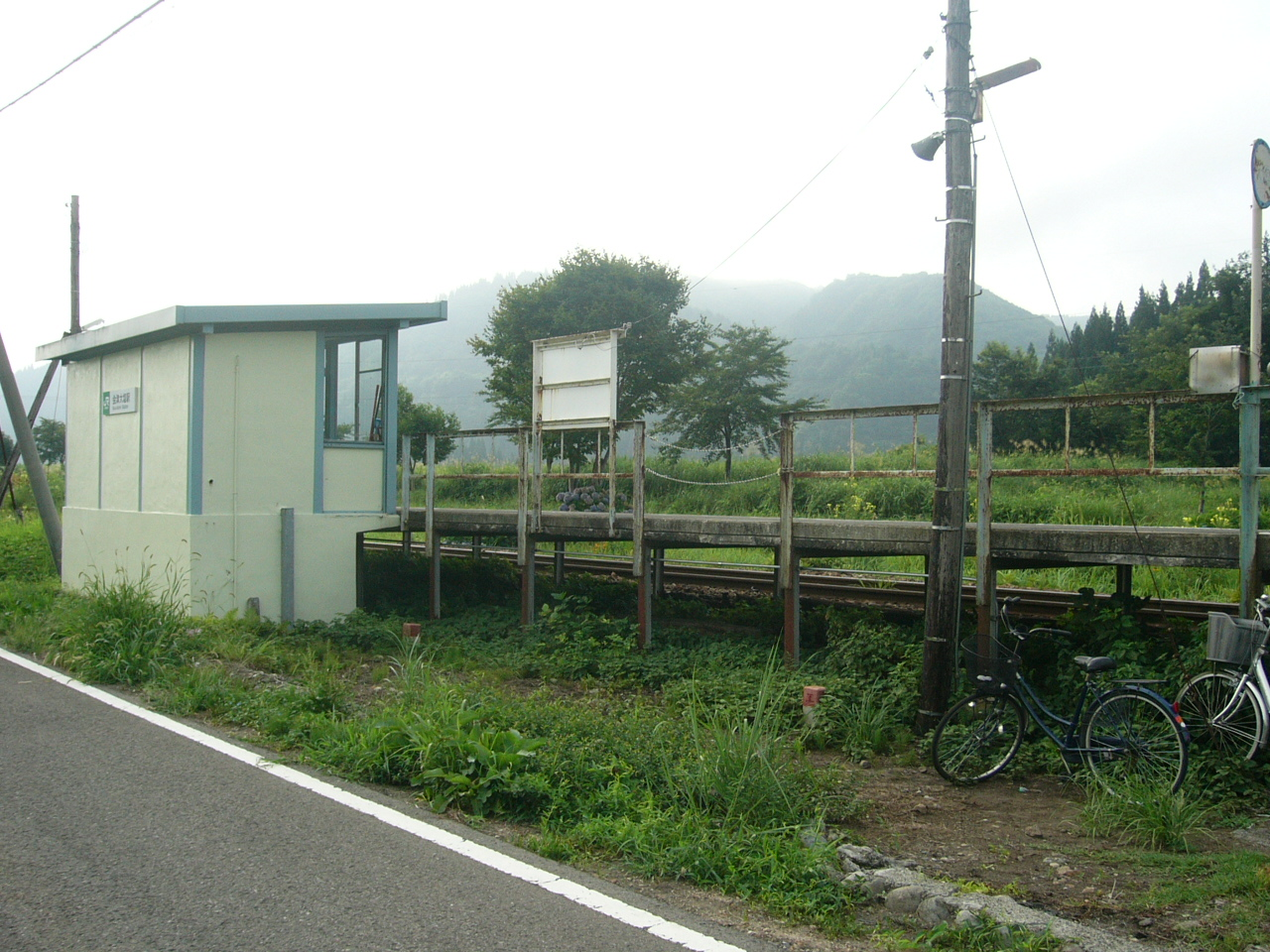
- Aizu-Ōshio Station in August 2006

General information
- Location: Ōshio, Kaneyama-machi, Ōnuma-gun, Fukushima-ken 968-0411; Japan
- Coordinates: 37.3926°N 139.4128°E
- Operator: JR East
- Line: ■ Tadami Line
- Distance: 75.4 km from Aizu-Wakamatsu
- Platforms: 1 side platform
- Tracks: 1

Other information
- Status: Unstaffed
- Website: Official website

History
- Opened: February 1, 1965

Services
Preceding station	JR East	Following station
Aizu-Shiozawa towards Koide	Tadami Line	Aizu-Yokota towards Aizu-Wakamatsu
Location
- Location within JR Tadami Line Location within Fukushima Prefecture Location within Japan

Aizu-Ōshio Station (会津大塩駅, Aizu-Ōshio-eki) is a railway station on the Tadami Line in the town of Kaneyama, Ōnuma District, Fukushima Prefecture, Japan, operated by East Japan Railway Company (JR East).

== Lines ==
Aizu-Ōshio Station is served by the Tadami Line, and is located 75.4 rail kilometers from the official starting point of the line at Aizu-Wakamatsu.

== Station layout ==
Aizu-Ōshio Station has one side platform serving a single bi-directional track. The platform is very short and can only accommodate a single carriage. The station is unattended.

== History ==
Aizu-Ōshio Station opened on February 1, 1965, as an intermediate station on the extension of eastern section of the Japanese National Railways (JNR) Tadami Line between Aizu-Kawaguchi and Tadami. The station was absorbed into the JR East network upon the privatization of the JNR on April 1, 1987.

Due to damage caused by torrential rainfall on July 30, 2011, services on the section of line between Aizu-Kawaguchi and Tadami, which includes this station were replaced by a provisional bus service. The closed section resumed operations on 1 October 2022.

== Surrounding area ==
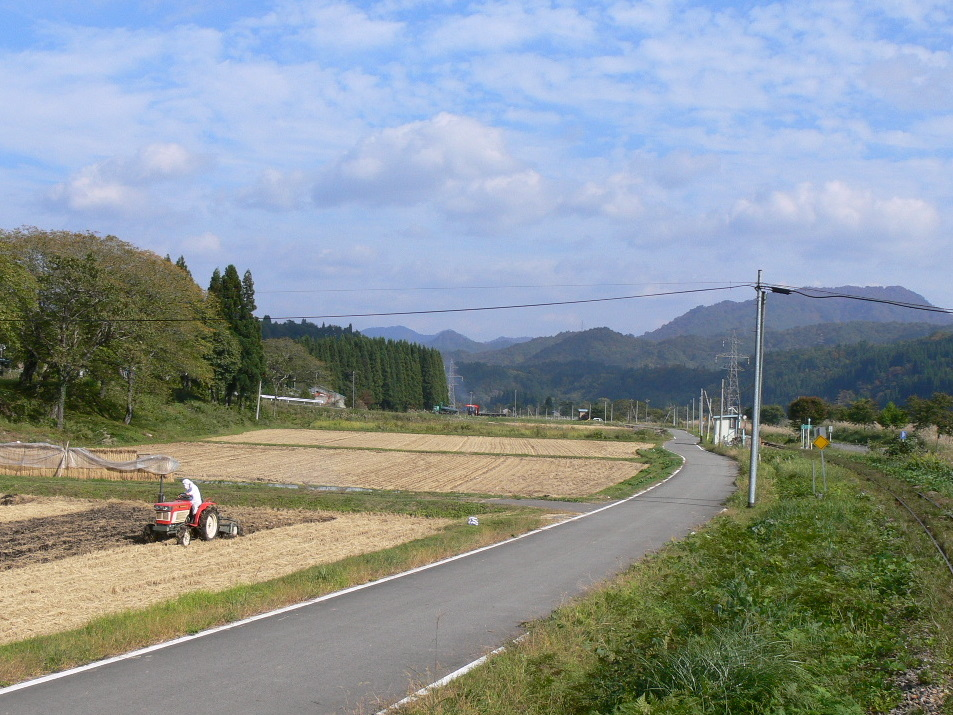
Surrounding area (October 2006)

- Tadami River
- Ōshio onsen
- National Route 252

== See also ==
- List of railway stations in Japan
