= C63 =

C63 or C-63 may refer to:

- Caldwell 63, a planetary nebula
- Convention concerning Statistics of Wages and Hours of Work, 1938 of the International Labour Organization
- JNR Class C63, a proposed Japanese steam locomotive
- Lockheed C-63 Hudson, an American military transport aircraft
- Mercedes-AMG C 63, a German automobile
- Ruy Lopez, a chess opening
