= JNR Class C12 =

Class of 282 Japanese 2-6-2T locomotives

JNR Class C12 Taiwan Railways Class CK120 North China Transport Class PureA (プレA) China Railways Class PL51 Vietnam Railways Class 131 Indonesian State Railways Class C32
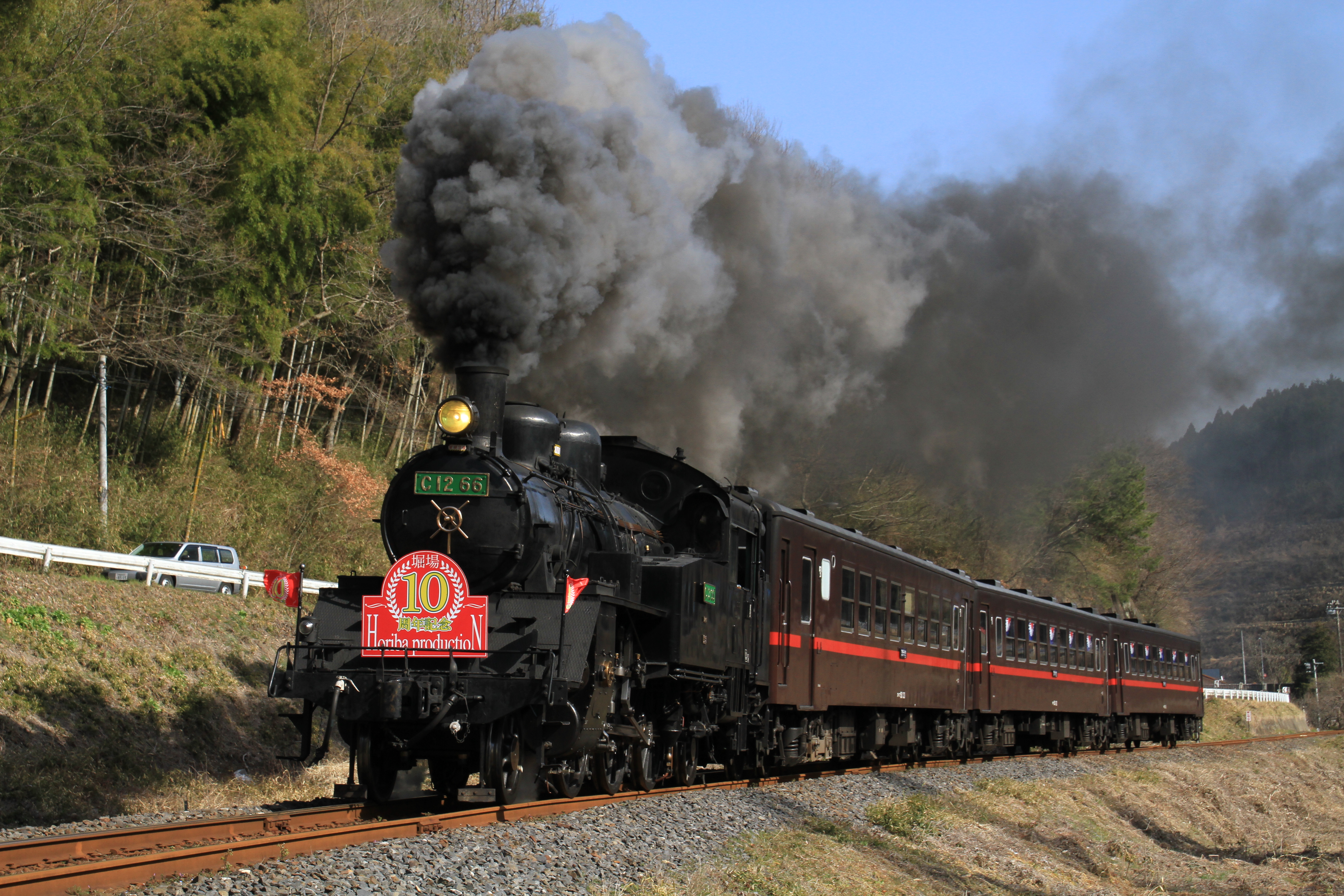
- Preserved C12 66, on the Mooka Railway, March 2012
Type and origin
- Power type: Steam
- Builder: Nippon Sharyo (110); Kawasaki (56); Kisha Seizō (44); Mitsubishi (17); Hitachi (55)
- Build date: 1932–1947
- Total produced: 282
Specifications
- Configuration
  - Whyte: 2-6-2T
  - UIC: 1′C1′ h2t
- Gauge: 1,067 mm (3 ft 6 in); 1,000 mm (3 ft 3 3/8 in) metre gauge (Vietnam Railways)
- Driver dia.: 1,400 mm (55 1/8 in)
- Length: 11,350 mm (37 ft 2 3/4 in)
- Height: 3,900 mm (12 ft 9 1/2 in)
- Axle load: 10.90 tonnes (10.73 long tons; 12.02 short tons)
- Adhesive weight: 32.00 tonnes (31.49 long tons; 35.27 short tons)
- Loco weight: 50.05 tonnes (49.26 long tons; 55.17 short tons)
- Fuel type: Coal
- Fuel capacity: 1.50 tonnes (1.48 long tons; 1.65 short tons)
- Water cap.: 5,500 litres (1,200 imp gal; 1,500 US gal)
- Firebox
  - Grate area: 1.30 m^{2} (14.0 sq ft)
- Boiler
  - Tube plates: 3,200 mm (10 ft 6 in)
  - Small tubes: 45 mm (1 3/4 in), 68 off
  - Large tubes: 127 mm (5 in), 16 off
- Boiler pressure: 14.0 kg/cm^{2} (1.37 MPa; 199 psi)
- Heating surface
  - Firebox: 7.4 m^{2} (80 sq ft)
  - Tubes and flues: 46.1 m^{2} (496 sq ft)
  - Total surface: 53.5 m^{2} (576 sq ft)
- Superheater
  - Heating area: 19.8 m^{2} (213 sq ft)
- Cylinders: Two, outside
- Cylinder size: 400 by 610 millimetres (15 3/4 in × 24 in)
- Valve gear: Walschaerts
Performance figures
- Power output: 505 PS (371 kW; 498 hp)
- Tractive effort: 81.356 kN (18,290 lbf)
Career
- Operators: Japanese Government Railways; Japanese National Railways; North China Transport; China Railway; Taiwan Railways; Vietnam Railways; Indonesian State Railways
- Class: JGR/JNR: C12; NCTC: プレA; CR: PL51; TRA: CK120; VR: 131; IR: C32
- Number in class: JGR/JNR: 282; NCTC: 60; CR: 60; TRA: 7; IR: 2
- Numbers: JGR/JNR: C12 1–C12 282; NCTC: プレA1501−プレA1560; TRA: CK121−CK127; IR: C3201-C3202
- Retired: 1970 (Japan), 1971-1976 (Vietnam), 1975-1983 (China), 1982-1989 (Taiwan), 1980 (Indonesia)

The Class C12 are a type of 2-6-2T "Prairie" type steam locomotives built by the Japanese Government Railways and the Japanese National Railways from 1932 to 1947. A total of 282 Class C12 locomotives were built and designed by Hideo Shima.

== Service outside Japan ==
=== North China Transport プレA, China Railways PL51, Vietnam Railways 131 ===
From 1938 to 1939, 60 C12s were converted to metre gauge and shipped to the North China Transportation Company, where they operated primarily between Zhengding and Taiyuan. They were classified プレA (PureA). In 1939 Shijiazhuang–Taiyuan Railway was converted to standard gauge, these locomotives removed to Datong–Puzhou Railway north section. After the establishment of the People's Republic of China, they were taken over by the China Railway, where they were classified ㄆㄌ51 in 1951, and PL51 in 1959. In 1956 the Datong–Puzhou Railway north section was reconverted to standard gauge, they were transferred to Vietnam, and they were classified 131.

=== Taiwan Railways Administration CK120 ===
From 1936 to 1941, the Nippon-Sharyo was built in 7 C12s for Governor-General of Taiwan Railway. After World War II, they were taken over by Taiwan Railways Administration, and they were classified CK120. CK124 is preserved at Changhua Locomotive Depot.

=== Indonesian State Railways Class C32 ===
In 1943, the Imperial Japanese Army sent two locomotives, C12 94 and C12 168, to Surabaya, Java for a military transport with a 1067 mm gauge. They were based at Sidotopo depot. The original knuckle coupler were replaced with Norwegian coupler. After the war, the two locomotives were received by the Indonesian Railways and were classed as C32. The Indonesian Railways only used them as shunters for goods wagons in Surabaya as they were out of gauge for the Indonesian loading gauge. Both of the locomotives were scrapped around 1980s.

== Preserved examples ==
At least 26 Class C12 locomotives are preserved, as listed below, with four in working order.

=== Japan ===
- C12 66: Mooka Railway Mooka Line, Mooka, Tochigi (operational)
- C12 167: Wakasa Railway (operational, runs on compressed air)
- C12 244: Akechi Line (operational, runs on compressed air)
- C12 2: Mikasa, Hokkaido
- C12 5
- C12 6
- C12 29
- C12 38
- C12 49
- C12 60
- C12 64
- C12 67: Preserved in front of Chino Station in Chino, Nagano.
- C12 69
- C12 74
- C12 85
- C12 88: Itoigawa, Niigata
- C12 163
- C12 164: Operated on the Ōigawa Railway until 2005.
- C12 171
- C12 187
- C12 199
- C12 208: Ōigawa Railway, Shimada, Shizuoka (used for spares; static display as Percy for Day Out with Thomas events)
- C12 222
- C12 230
- C12 231: Preserved in front of Uchiko Station in Uchiko, Ehime. Built in 1939 and withdrawn in 1970, it was first preserved in the grounds of an elementary school before being moved to Uchiko Station in 1997.
- C12 241
- C12 259
- C12 280: Preserved in Komatsushima Station Park in Komatsushima, Tokushima
- C12 287
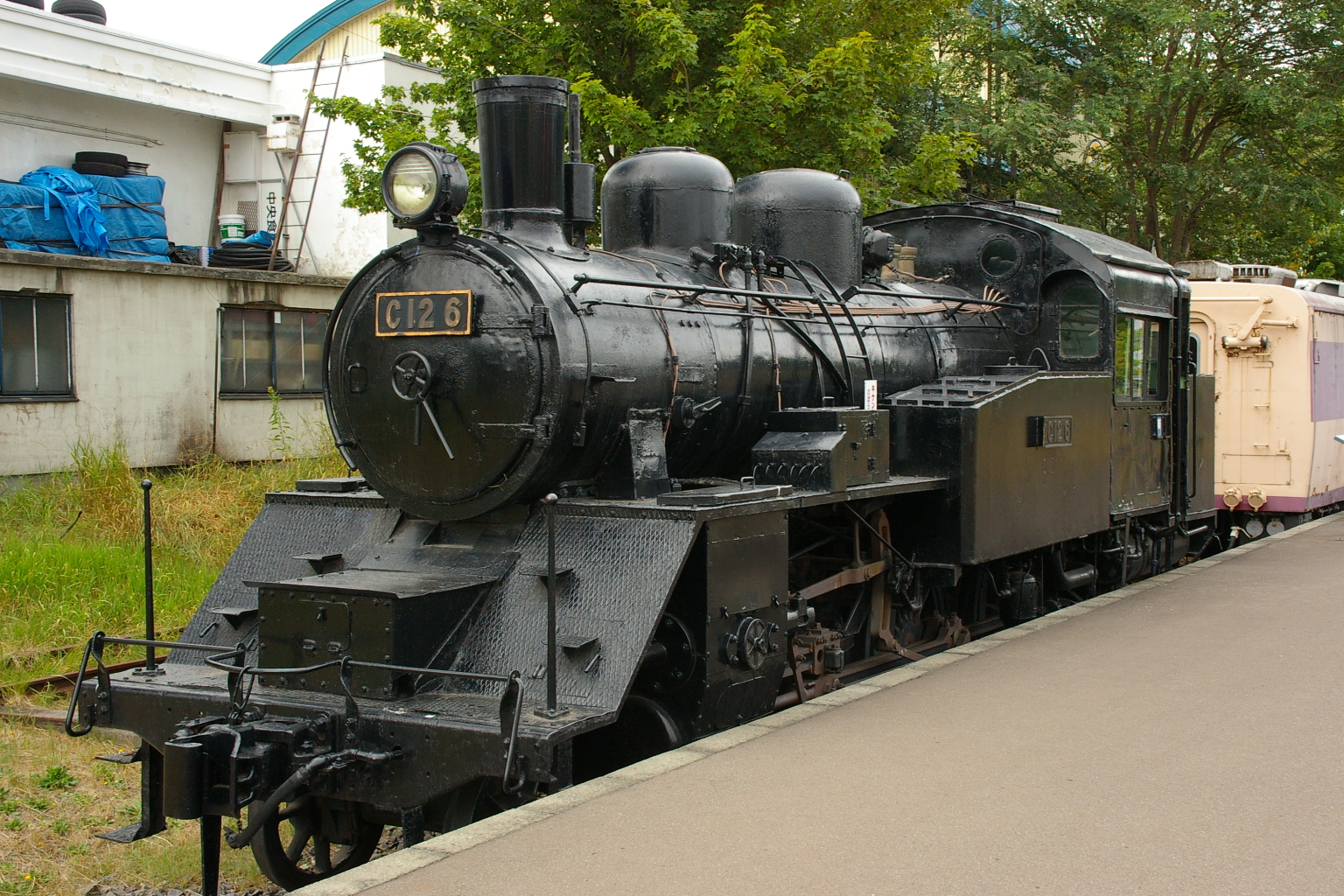
C12 6 at Otaru Museum in July 2007

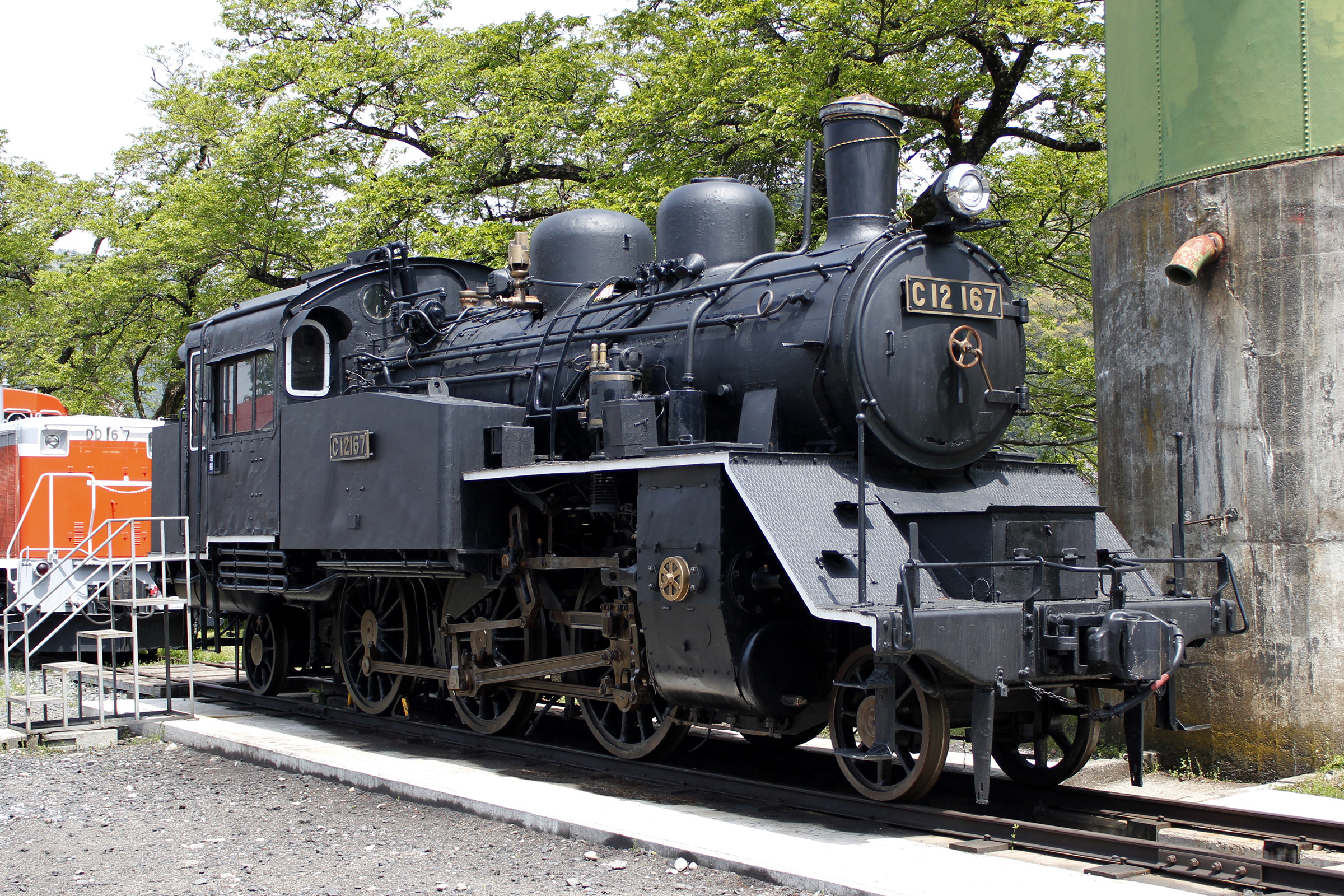
C12 167 in April 2013

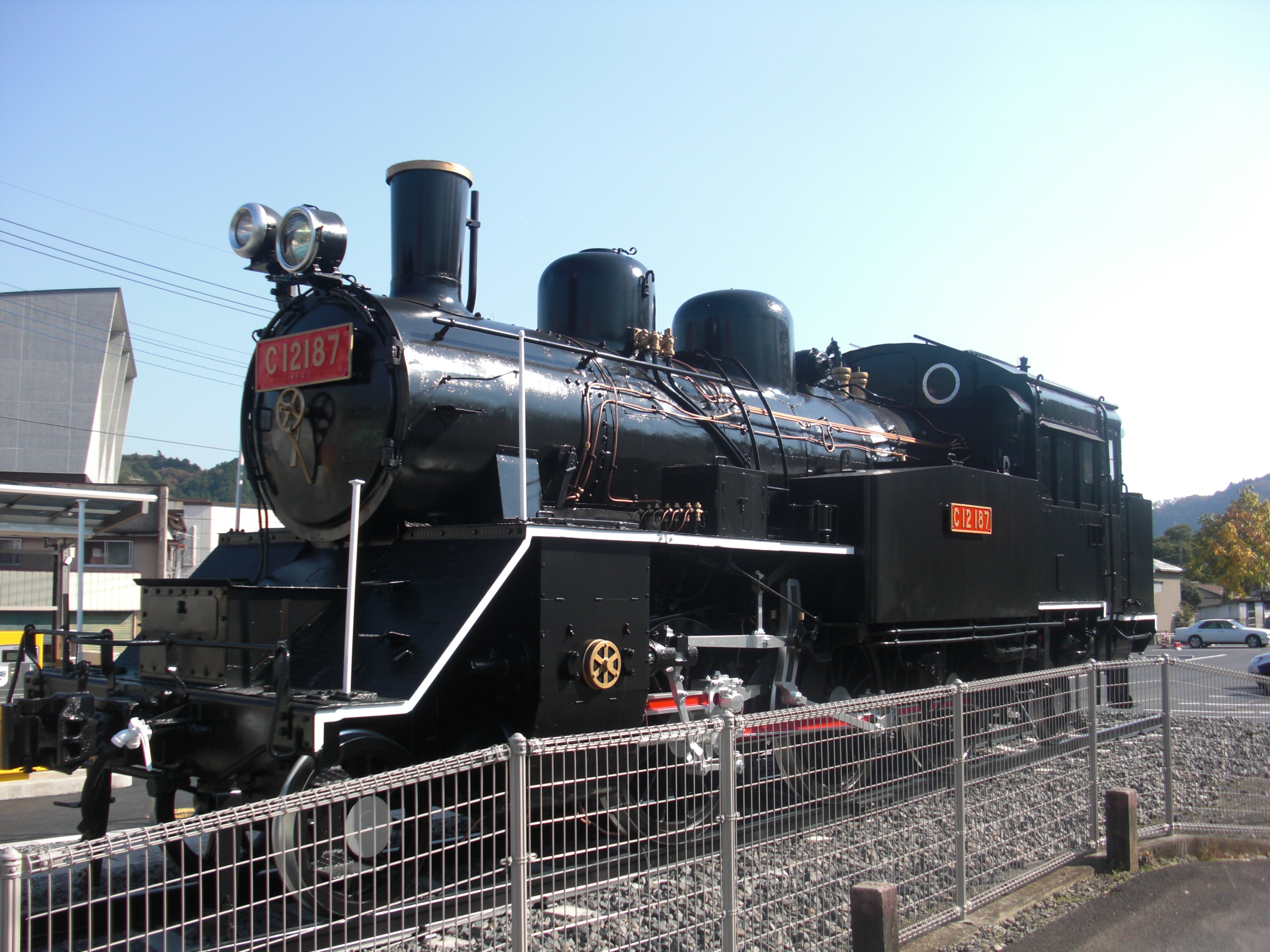
C12 187 at Hitachi-Daigo Station in November 2010

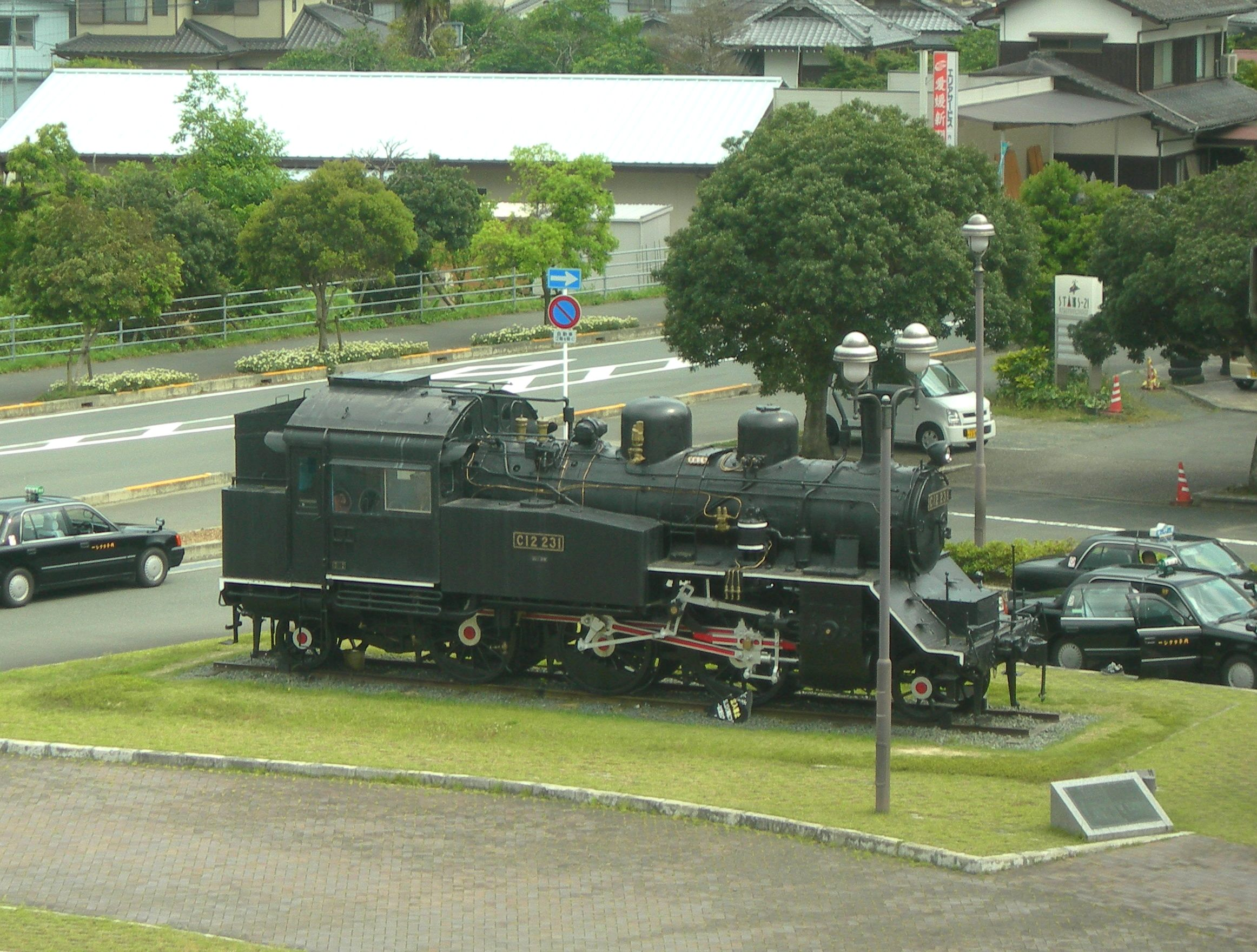
C12 231 in front of Uchiko Station in May 2010

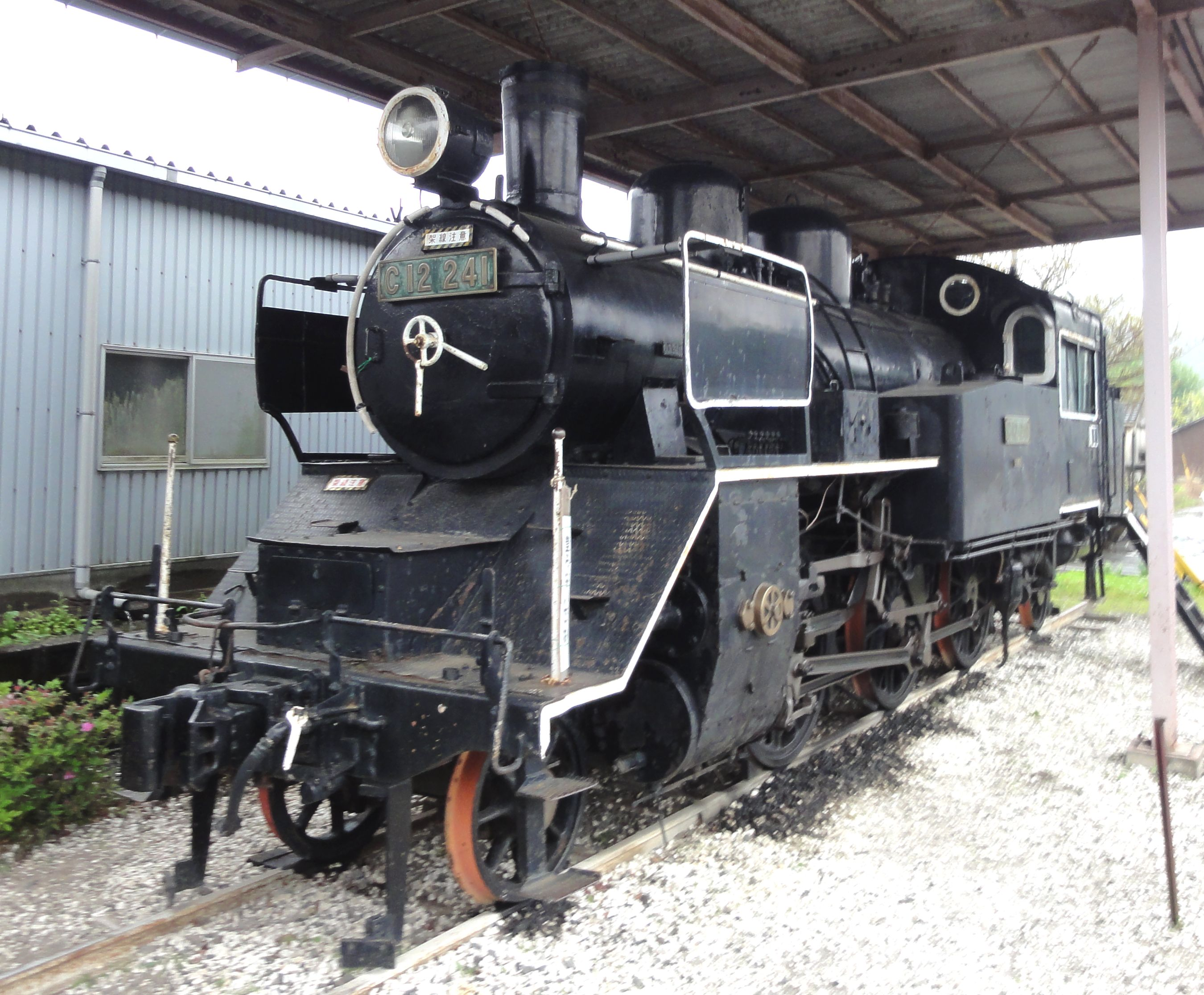
C12 241 in April 2013

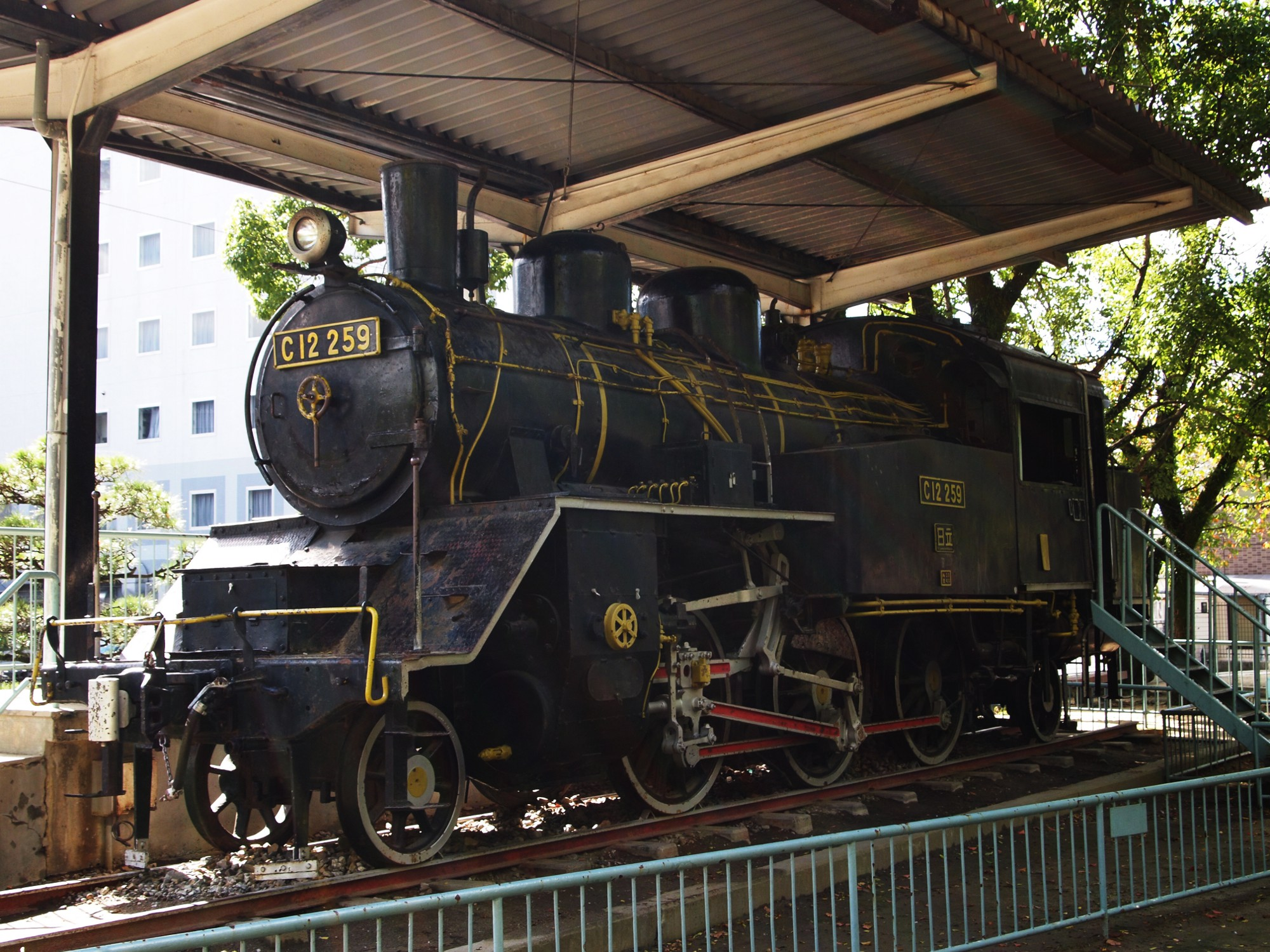
C12 259, October 2011

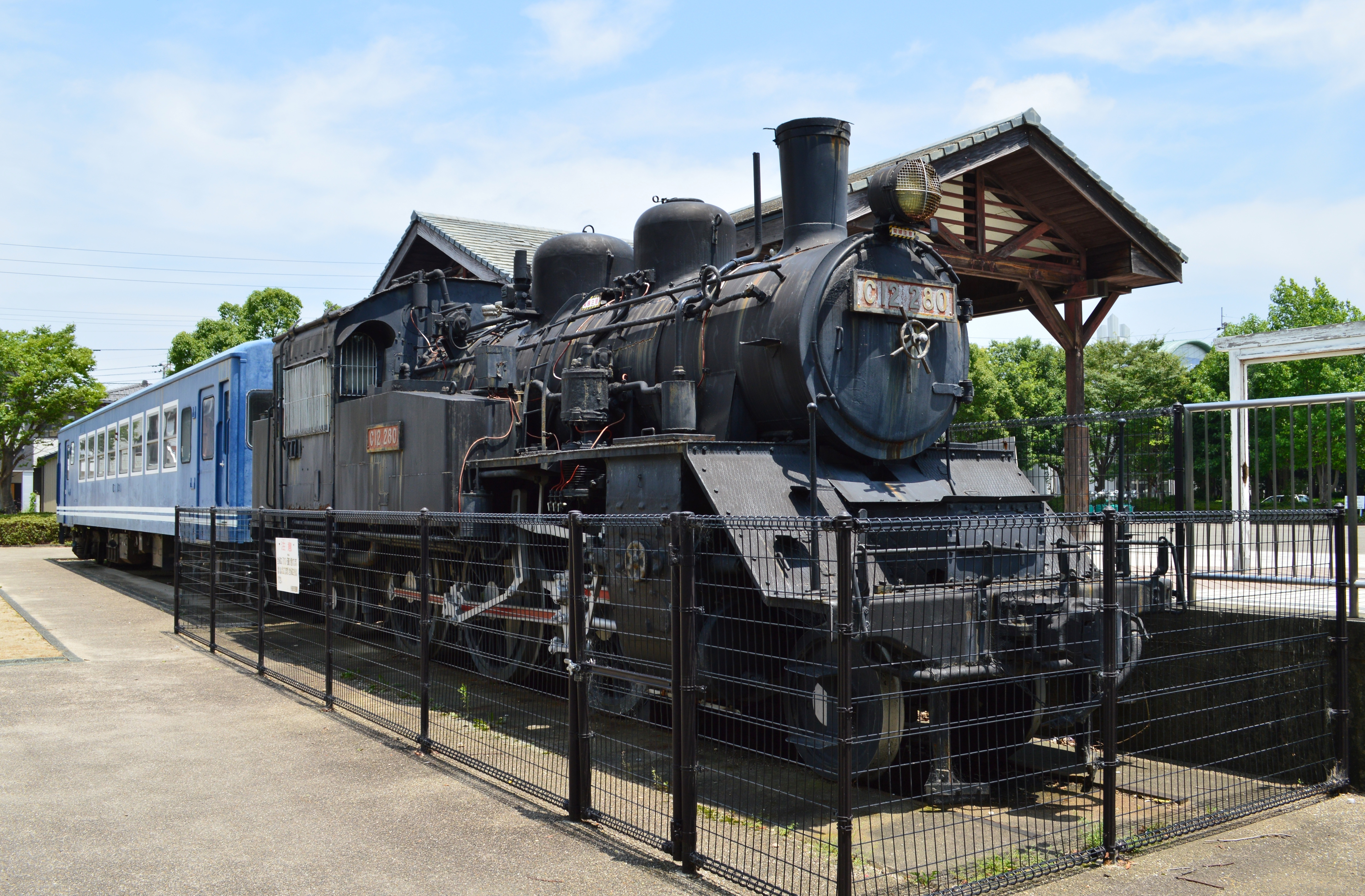
C12 280 in Komatsushima Station Park in July 2016

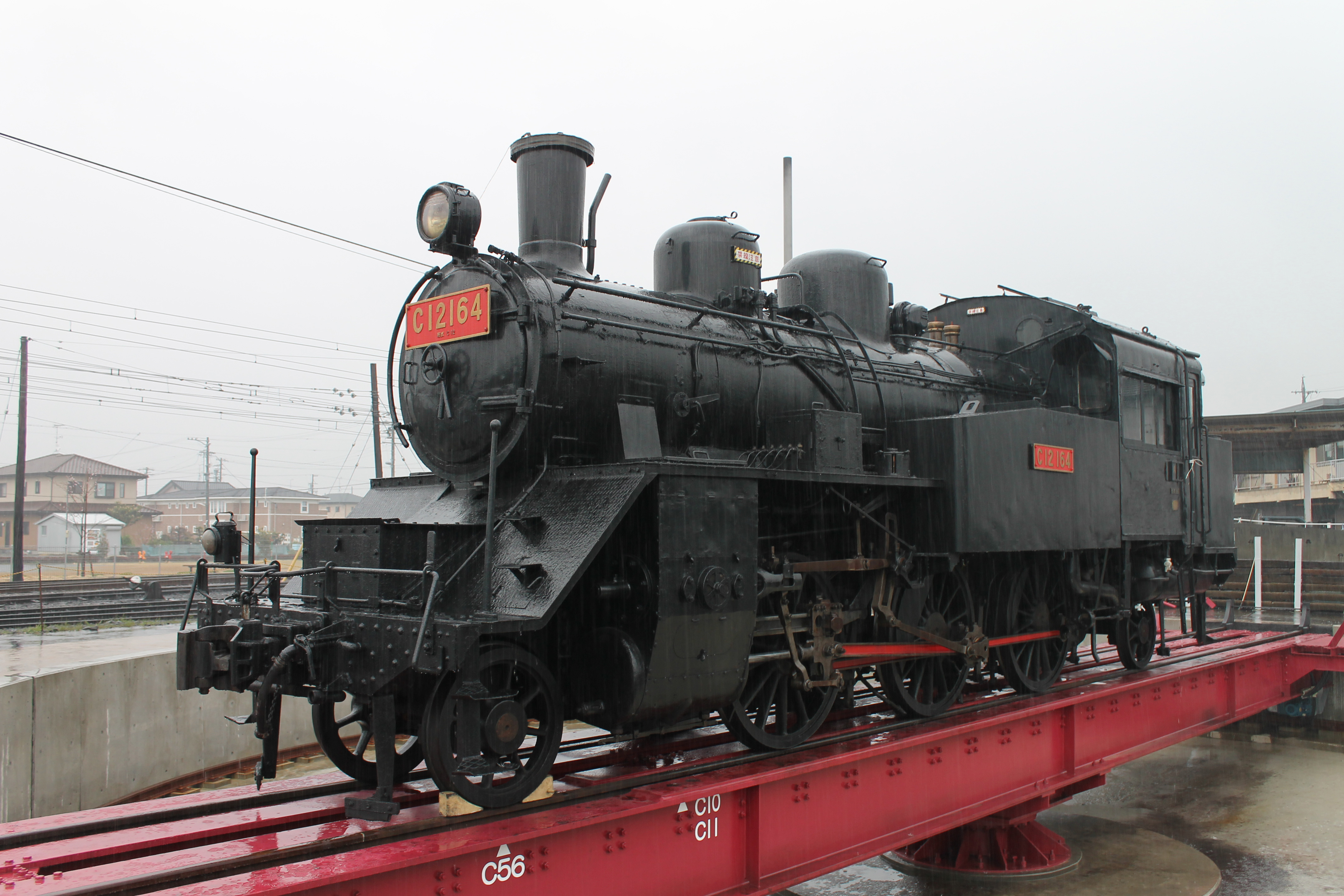
C12 164, April 2012

=== Taiwan ===
- C12 4 (CK124): Taiwan Railways, Changhua Railway Roundhouse (operational)
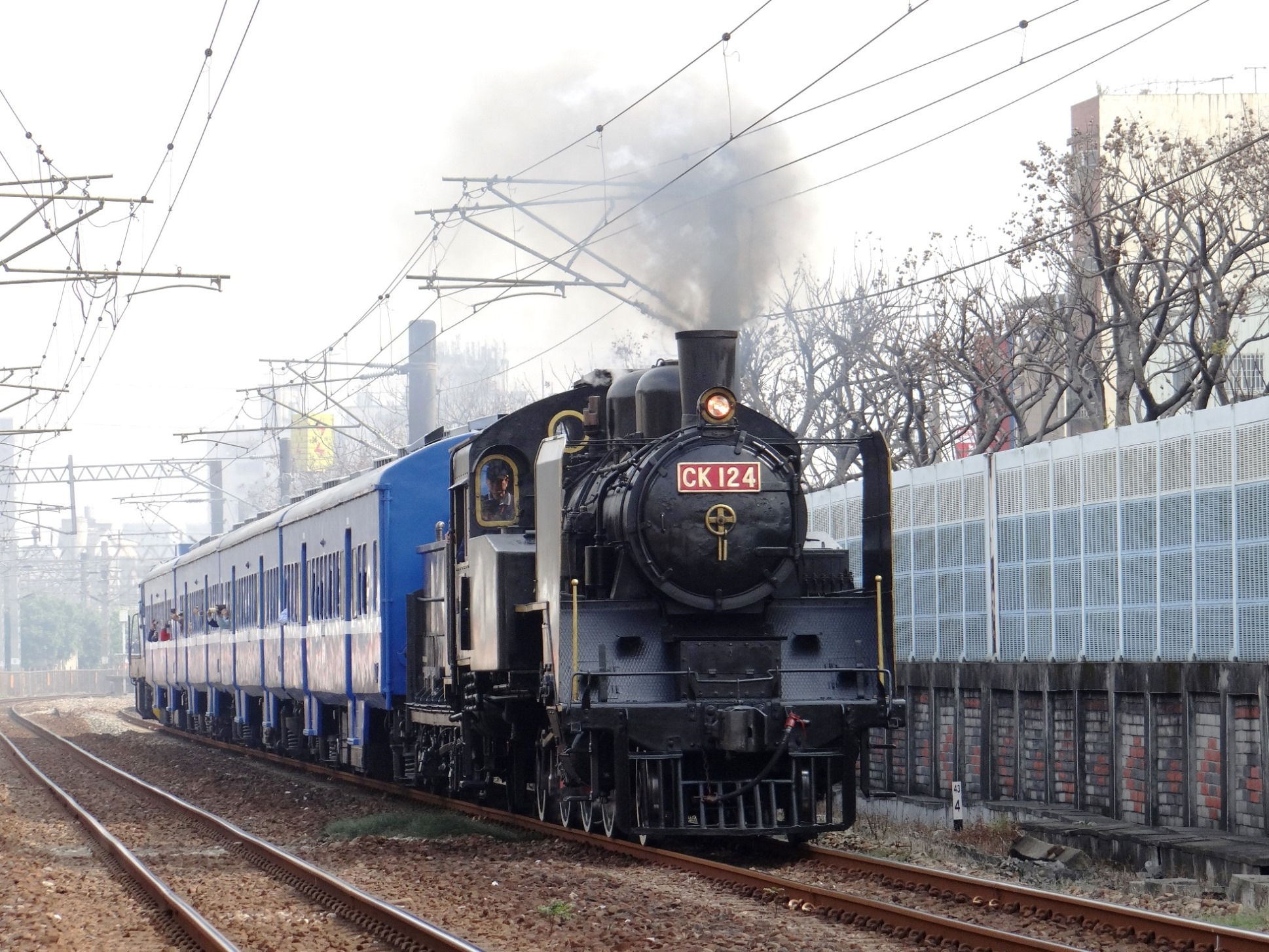
CK124

=== Vietnam ===
- C12 119 (131–428): Preserved in Da Lat Railway Station in Dalat city, Lam Dong province, Vietnam
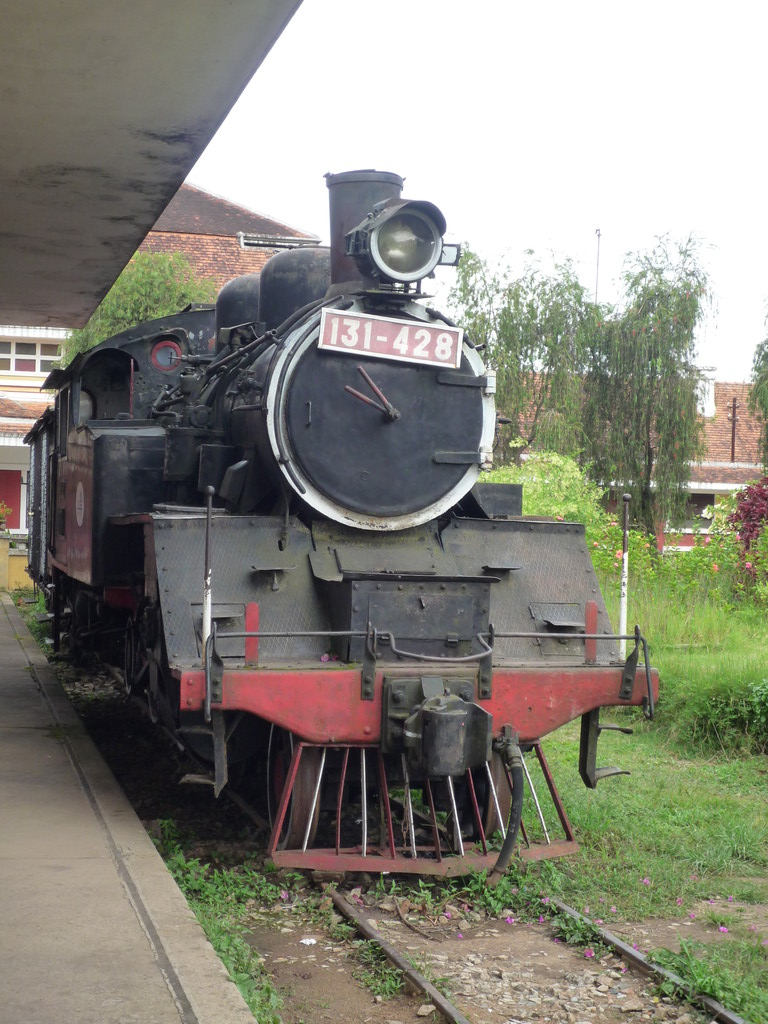
131-428 in Da Lat Station in July 2008

== See also ==
- Japan Railways locomotive numbering and classification
- List of operational steam locomotives in Japan
- JNR Class C58
- JNR Class C63
