= Aizu-Gamō Station =

Railway station in Tadami, Fukushima Prefecture, Japan

Aizu-Gamō Station 会津蒲生駅
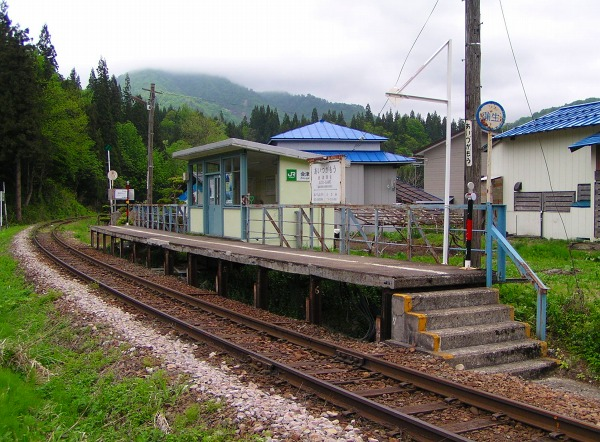
- Aizu-Gamō Station in May 2006

General information
- Location: Gamō, Tadami-machi, Minamiaizu-gun, Fukushima-ken 968-0414; Japan
- Coordinates: 37°22′54″N 139°20′00″E
- Operator: JR East
- Line: ■ Tadami Line
- Distance: 83.9 km from Aizu-Wakamatsu
- Platforms: 1 side platform
- Tracks: 1

Other information
- Status: Unstaffed
- Website: Official website

History
- Opened: 20 October 1963

Services
Preceding station	JR East	Following station
Tadami towards Koide	Tadami Line	Aizu-Shiozawa towards Aizu-Wakamatsu
Location
- Location within JR Tadami Line Location within Fukushima Prefecture Location within Japan

Aizu-Gamō Station (会津蒲生駅, Aizu-Gamō-eki) is a railway station on the Tadami Line in the town of Tadami, Minamiaizu District, Fukushima Prefecture, Japan, operated by East Japan Railway Company (JR East).

== Lines ==
Aizu-Gamō Station is served by the Tadami Line, and is located 83.9 kilometers from the official starting point of the line at Aizu-Wakamatsu.

== Station layout ==
Aizu-Gamō Station has one side platform serving a single bi-directional track. The platform is very short and can only accommodate a single carriage. The station is unattended.

== History ==
Aizu-Gamō Station was opened by the Japanese National Railways (JNR) on October 20, 1963, as an intermediate station on the extension of eastern section of the Tadami Line between Aizu-Kawaguchi and Tadami. The station was absorbed into the JR East network upon the privatization of the JNR on April 1, 1987.

Due to damage caused by torrential rainfall on July 30, 2011, services on the section of line between Aizu-Kawaguchi and Tadami, which includes this station were replaced by a provisional bus service. The closed section resumed operations on 1 October 2022.

== Surrounding area ==
- National Route 252

== See also ==
- List of railway stations in Japan
