= JNR Class C63 =

Proposed Japanese steam locomotive

Class C63
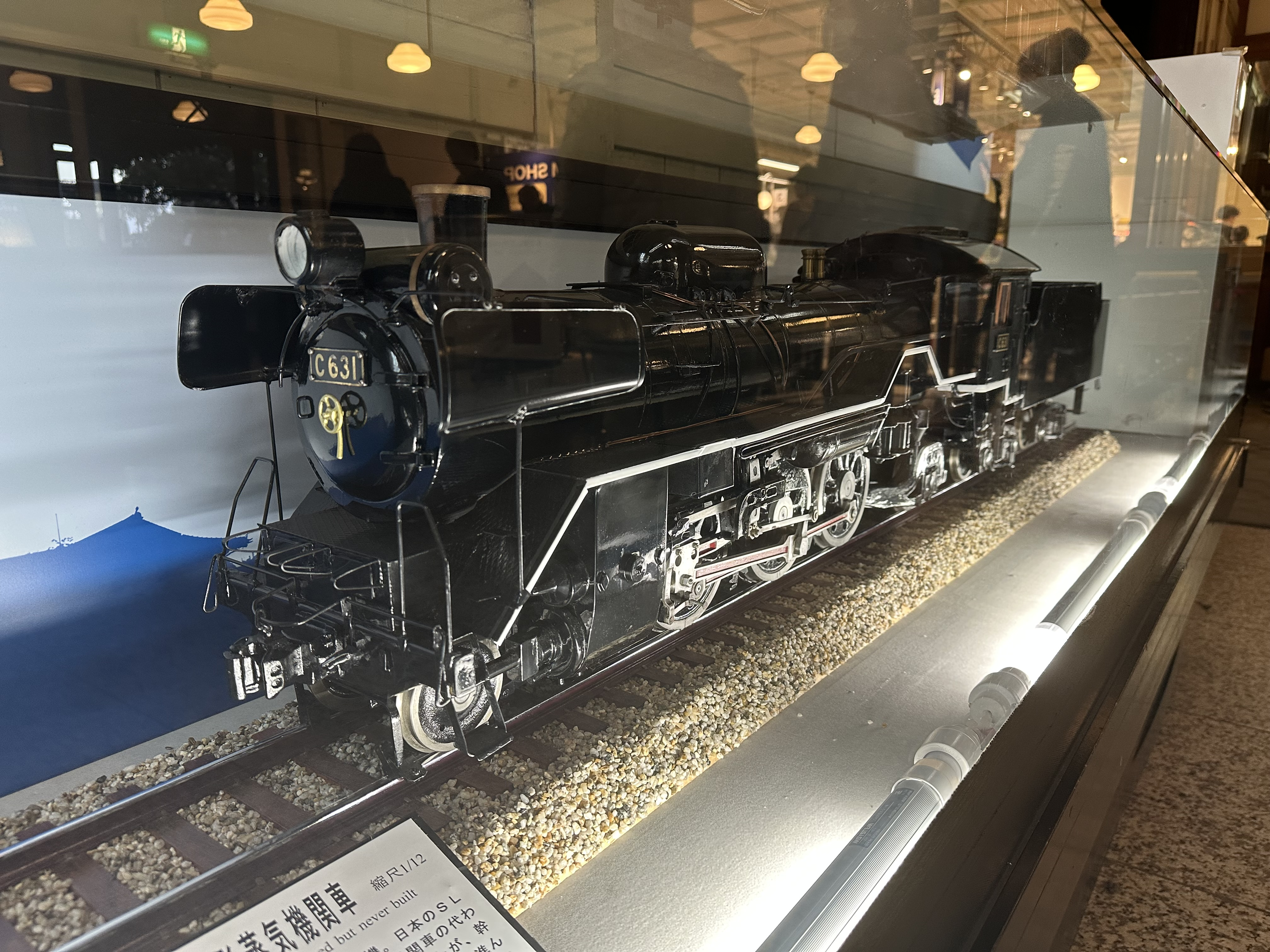
- 1/12 scale model of C63 1 at the Kyoto Railway Museum
Type and origin
- Power type: Steam
- Total produced: 0
Specifications
- Configuration
  - Whyte: 2-6-2 Prairie
- Gauge: 1,067 mm (3 ft 6 in)
- Driver dia.: 1,520 mm (5 ft 0 in)
- Length: 18,275 mm (59 ft 11.5 in)
- Total weight: 100.20 t
Performance figures
- Tractive effort: 12,570 kgf (123,300 N; 27,700 lbf)
Career
- Disposition: Never built

The JNR Class C63 was a 2-6-2 steam locomotive proposed by Japanese National Railways (JNR). Designed in 1956 by Hideo Shima, it was based on the Class C58, but none of these locomotives were ever actually built.

== Background ==
The planning of the JNR Class C63 began around 1955. Electrification for the locomotive developed slowly due to financial difficulties at JNR. The company was not experienced with diesel locomotives, and it lacked test facilities for non-steam engines. Development of the new steam locomotive was proposed because existing models were aging and travel demand was increasing.

== Cancellation ==
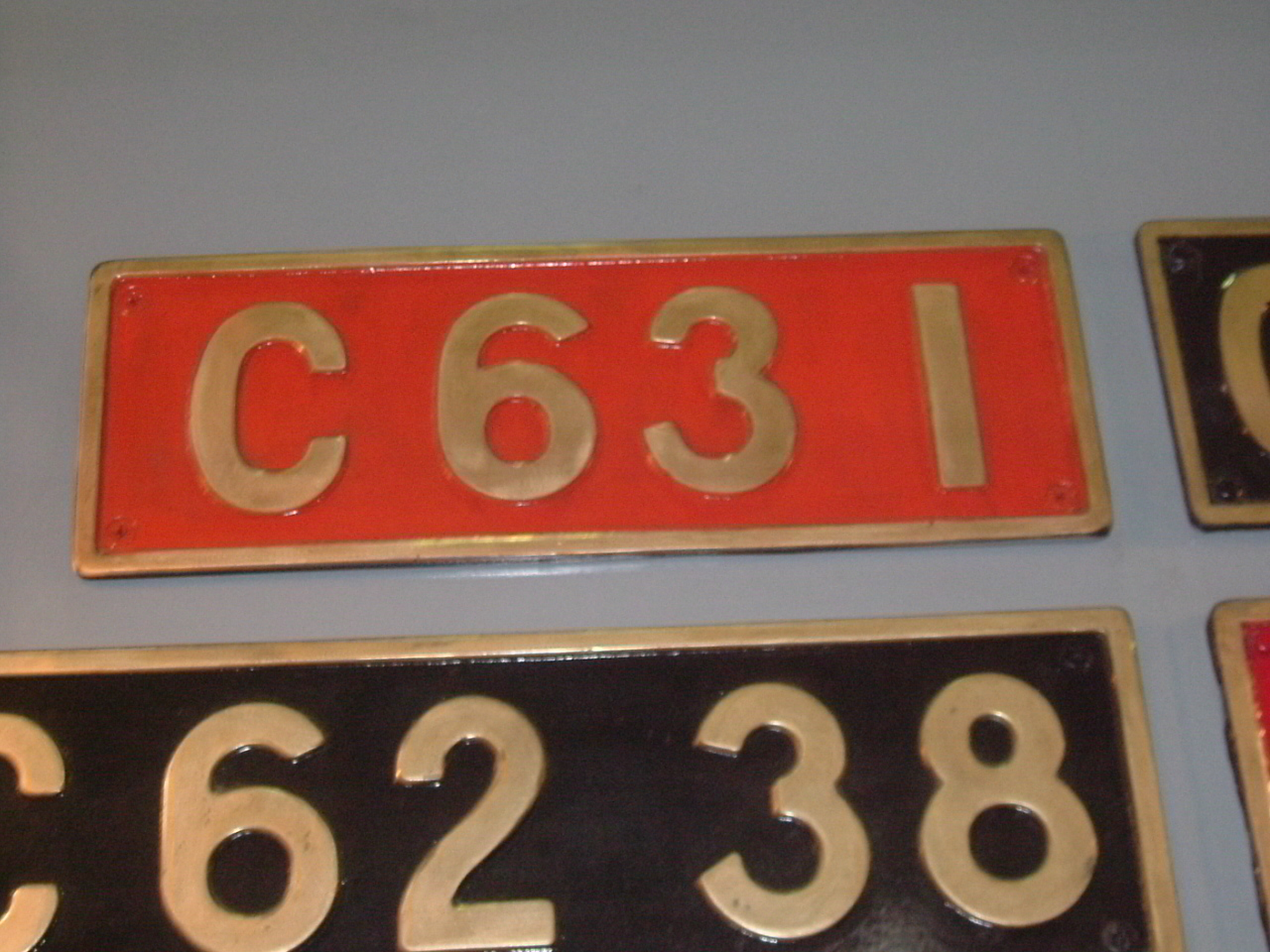
Number plate of C63 1 exhibited at the Kyoto Railway Museum

In 1956, the design drawing was completed. A prototype was to be manufactured, and a manufacturing order was to be issued.

In 1958, JNR, in its "Power Modernization Plan", planned to eliminate the steam locomotive in 15 years from fiscal year 1960. JNR authorized the implementation of the plan and completed it in 1975. Since JNR had converted to the policy of abolishing the steam locomotive, the company decided to cancel the C63.

At the Koriyama Plant (currently the Koriyama General Vehicle Center), a 1/5-scale live steam replica was produced based on the design documents, mainly to demonstrate the steam locomotive technology to the young staff; the miniature is currently used during special events. In addition to models being exhibited on the first floor of Koriyama Station, models are also displayed in the exhibition room of the Kyoto Railway Museum, alongside the number plate of C63 1 painted in vermilion.

== See also ==
- Japan Railways locomotive numbering and classification
- JNR Class C12
- JNR Class C58
