= Tadami, Fukushima =

Tadami 只見町
- Town
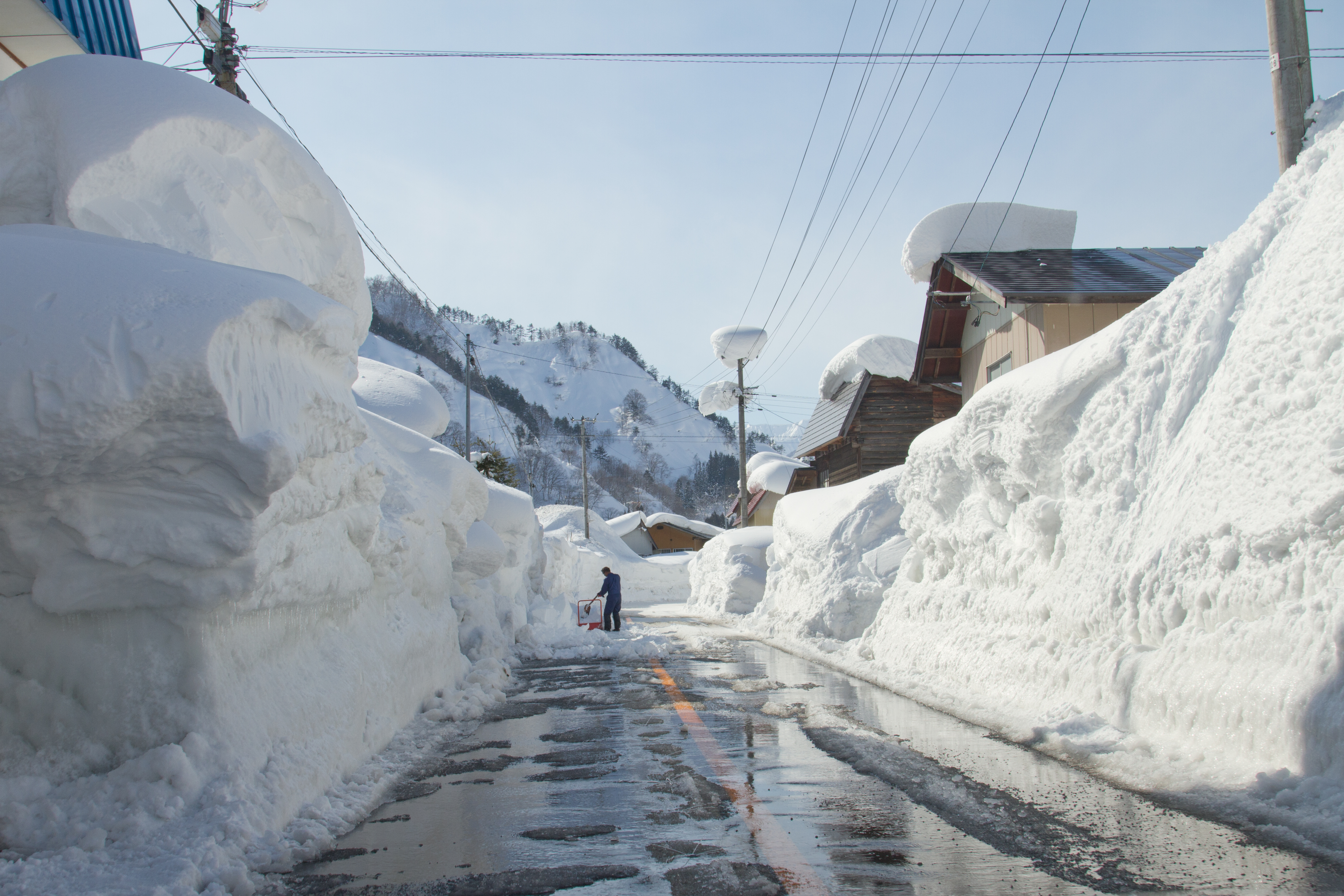
- Heavy snow in Tadami

- Flag Seal

- Location of Tadami in Fukushima Prefecture

- Coordinates: 37°20′55.3″N 139°18′57″E
- Country: Japan
- Region: Tōhoku
- Prefecture: Fukushima
- District: Minamiaizu

Area
  - Total: 747.56 km^{2} (288.63 sq mi)

Population (March 2020)
  - Total: 4,117
  - Density: 5.507/km^{2} (14.26/sq mi)
- Time zone: UTC+9 (Japan Standard Time)
- Phone number: 0241-82-5050
- Address: 1039 Ōaza Tadami Aza-Amazutsumi, Tadami-machi, Fukushima-ken 968-0421
- Climate: Cfa/Dfa
- Website: Official website
- Symbols
- Bird: Japanese bush-warbler
- Fish: Iwana
- Flower: Magnolia kobus
- Tree: Beech

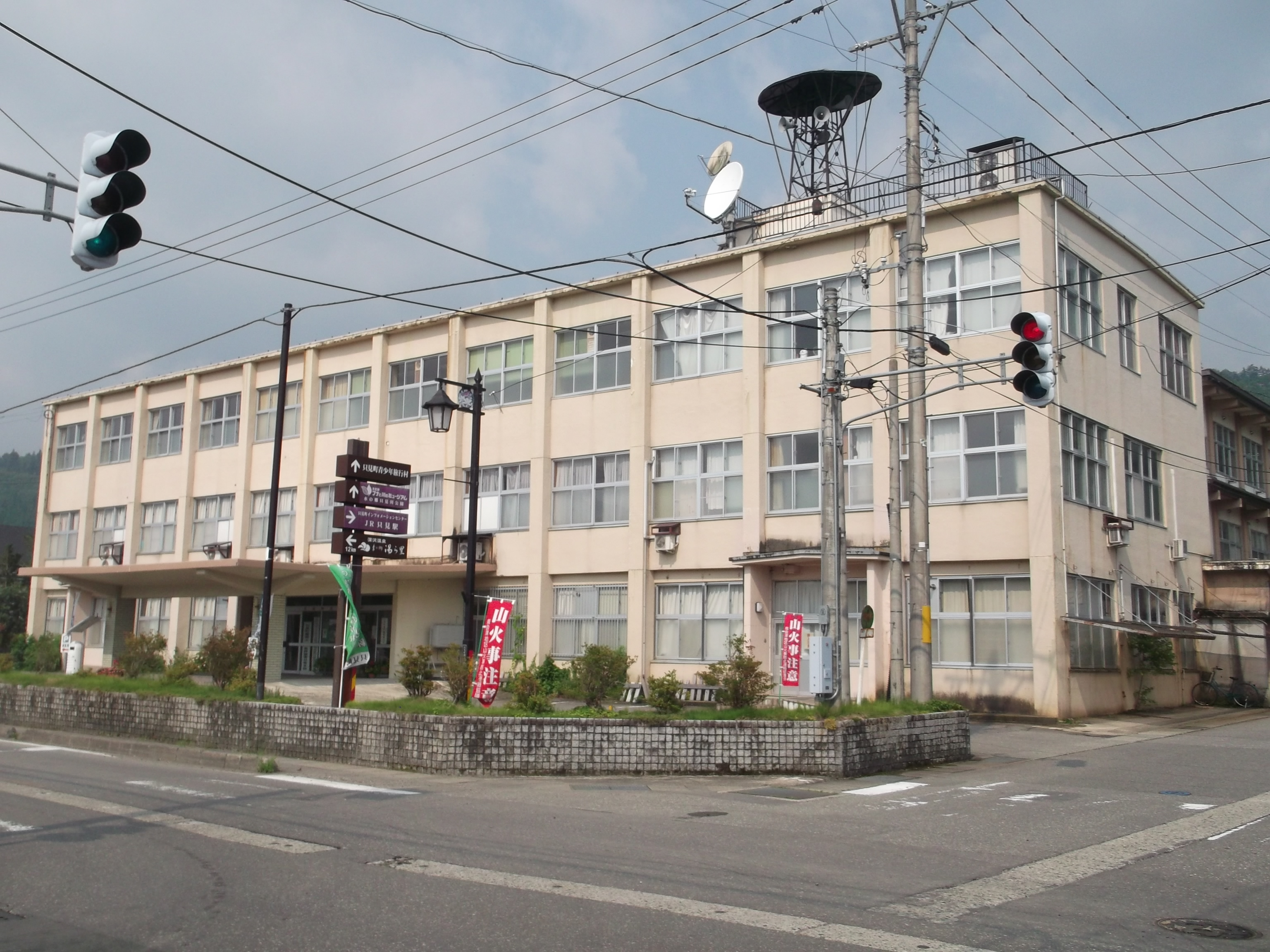
Tadami Town Hall

Tadami (只見町, Tadami-machi) is a town located in Fukushima Prefecture, Japan. As of 1 March 2020, the town has an estimated population of 4,117 in 1749 households, of which 45.88% were classified as "elderly households" The town had a population density of 5.5 persons per km^{2}. The total area of the town was 747.56 square kilometres (288.63 sq mi). Tadami is famous locally for its own Snow Festival, where huge sculptures and replicas of monuments are cut out of Tadami's abundant snow.

== Geography ==
Tadami is located in the mountainous western portion of the Aizu region of Fukushima Prefecture, bordered Niigata Prefecture to the west.

=== Mountains ===
- Aizuasahidake
- Asakusadake
- Gamoudake

=== Rivers ===
- Ina River
- Tadami River

=== Lakes ===
- Lake Tadami
- Lake Tagokura

=== Neighboring municipalities ===
- Fukushima Prefecture
  - Hinoemata
  - Kaneyama
  - Minamiaizu
  - Shōwa
- Niigata Prefecture
  - Aga
  - Sanjō
  - Uonuma

=== Climate ===
Tadami has a humid continental climate (Köppen Dfa) characterized by warm summers and cold winters with heavy snowfall. The average annual temperature in Tadami is 11.1 °C. The average annual rainfall is 1749 mm with September as the wettest month. The temperatures are highest on average in August, at around 24.4 °C, and lowest in January, at around -1.3 °C.

Climate data for Tadami (1991−2020 normals, extremes 1976−present)
Month	Jan	Feb	Mar	Apr	May	Jun	Jul	Aug	Sep	Oct	Nov	Dec	Year
Record high °C (°F)	11.8 (53.2)	15.7 (60.3)	19.6 (67.3)	28.4 (83.1)	33.3 (91.9)	33.6 (92.5)	36.2 (97.2)	36.5 (97.7)	35.3 (95.5)	30.8 (87.4)	24.3 (75.7)	18.8 (65.8)	36.5 (97.7)
Mean daily maximum °C (°F)	2.2 (36.0)	3.0 (37.4)	6.6 (43.9)	13.8 (56.8)	21.3 (70.3)	24.7 (76.5)	28.0 (82.4)	29.5 (85.1)	24.8 (76.6)	18.4 (65.1)	11.8 (53.2)	5.1 (41.2)	15.8 (60.4)
Daily mean °C (°F)	−1.2 (29.8)	−1.0 (30.2)	1.6 (34.9)	6.8 (44.2)	13.8 (56.8)	18.5 (65.3)	22.4 (72.3)	23.4 (74.1)	19.2 (66.6)	12.8 (55.0)	6.3 (43.3)	1.3 (34.3)	10.3 (50.5)
Mean daily minimum °C (°F)	−4.2 (24.4)	−4.6 (23.7)	−2.5 (27.5)	1.3 (34.3)	7.3 (45.1)	13.6 (56.5)	18.4 (65.1)	19.3 (66.7)	15.4 (59.7)	9.0 (48.2)	2.6 (36.7)	−1.6 (29.1)	6.2 (43.2)
Record low °C (°F)	−16.1 (3.0)	−19.6 (−3.3)	−16.3 (2.7)	−7.3 (18.9)	−0.7 (30.7)	4.0 (39.2)	10.8 (51.4)	11.2 (52.2)	5.0 (41.0)	−5.8 (21.6)	−10.1 (13.8)	−14.9 (5.2)	−19.6 (−3.3)
Average precipitation mm (inches)	302.3 (11.90)	216.3 (8.52)	164.7 (6.48)	114.6 (4.51)	100.4 (3.95)	147.0 (5.79)	321.1 (12.64)	196.3 (7.73)	151.8 (5.98)	176.5 (6.95)	227.4 (8.95)	321.7 (12.67)	2,445.9 (96.30)
Average snowfall cm (inches)	387 (152)	300 (118)	195 (77)	82 (32)	4 (1.6)	0 (0)	0 (0)	0 (0)	0 (0)	0 (0)	16 (6.3)	256 (101)	1,233 (485)
Average rainy days (≥ 1.0 mm)	24.4	20.4	19.5	14.2	12.1	13.2	16.2	13.6	14.0	15.2	18.3	23.2	204.3
Average snowy days (≥ 3 cm)	23.5	20.5	20.7	13.0	0.6	0	0	0	0	0.1	1.9	14.9	95.2
Mean monthly sunshine hours	34.1	52.3	91.7	149.8	186.7	139.5	130.9	163.2	119.0	102.0	80.0	44.4	1,295.4
Source: Japan Meteorological Agency

== Demographics ==
Per Japanese census data, the population of Tadami peaked around the year 1960 and has declined steadily in the decades since. It is now much smaller than it was a century ago.

Historical population
Year	Pop.	±%
1920	7,009	—
1930	7,728	+10.3%
1940	8,869	+14.8%
1950	10,434	+17.6%
1960	12,341	+18.3%
1970	8,838	−28.4%
1980	7,271	−17.7%
1990	6,170	−15.1%
2000	5,557	−9.9%
2010	4,932	−11.2%
2020	4,117	−16.5%

== History ==
The area of present-day Tadami was part of ancient Mutsu Province and formed part of the holdings of Aizu Domain during the Edo period. After the Meiji Restoration, it was organized as part of Minamiaizu District in Fukushima Prefecture. Inahoku village was founded on April 1, 1889, with the establishment of the modern municipalities system. It changed its name on November 3, 1953, to Tadami. The village expanded on July 20, 1955, through a merger with neighboring Meiwa Village. Tadami was raised to town status on August 1, 1959, after merging with the village of Asahi.

== Economy ==
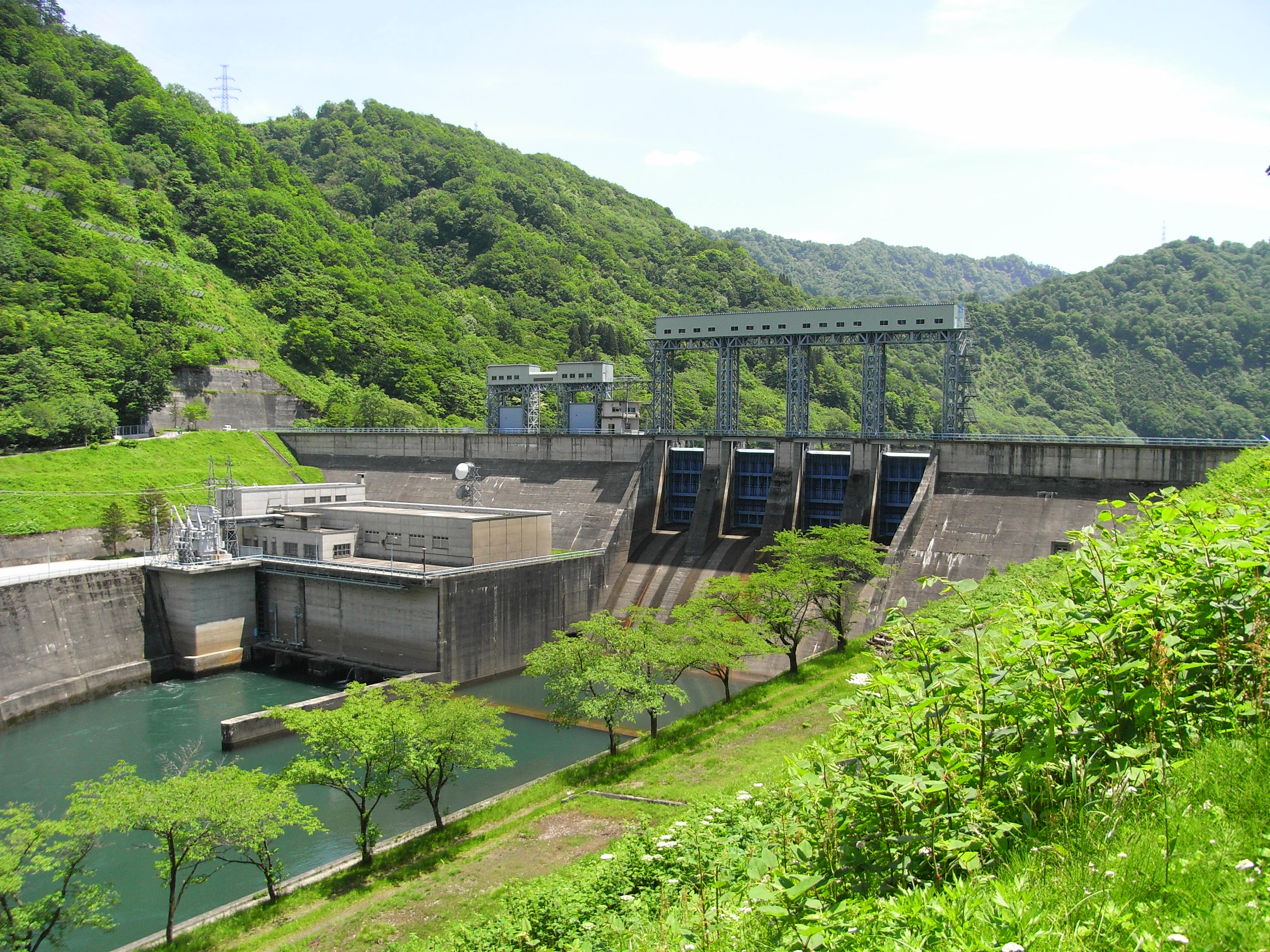
Taki Dam on the Tadami River

Hydroelectric power generation from numerous dams on the Tadami River is the primary source of revenue for the town.

== Education ==
The town has three public elementary schools and one public junior high school operated by the town government. The town has one public high school operated by the Fukushima Prefectural Board of Education.

=== Elementary schools ===
- Asahi Elementary School
- Meiwa Elementary School
- Tadami Elementary School

=== Junior high schools ===
- Tadami Junior High School

=== High schools ===
- Tadami High School

== Transportation ==
=== Railway ===
JR East – Tadami Line

- Aizu-Shiozawa - Aizu-Gamō - Tadami

=== Highway ===
- National Route 252
- National Route 289

== Local attractions ==
- Beech tree forest, listed on UNESCO Biosphere Reserves in 2014
- Fukasawa Hot Springs
- Kawai Tsuginosuke Museum
- Kurotani Shrine
- Mizukubo castle ruin
- Tadami Hot Springs
- Tadami Museum
- Tagokura Dam
