= Tadami Station =

Railway station in Tadami, Fukushima Prefecture, Japan

Tadami Station 只見駅
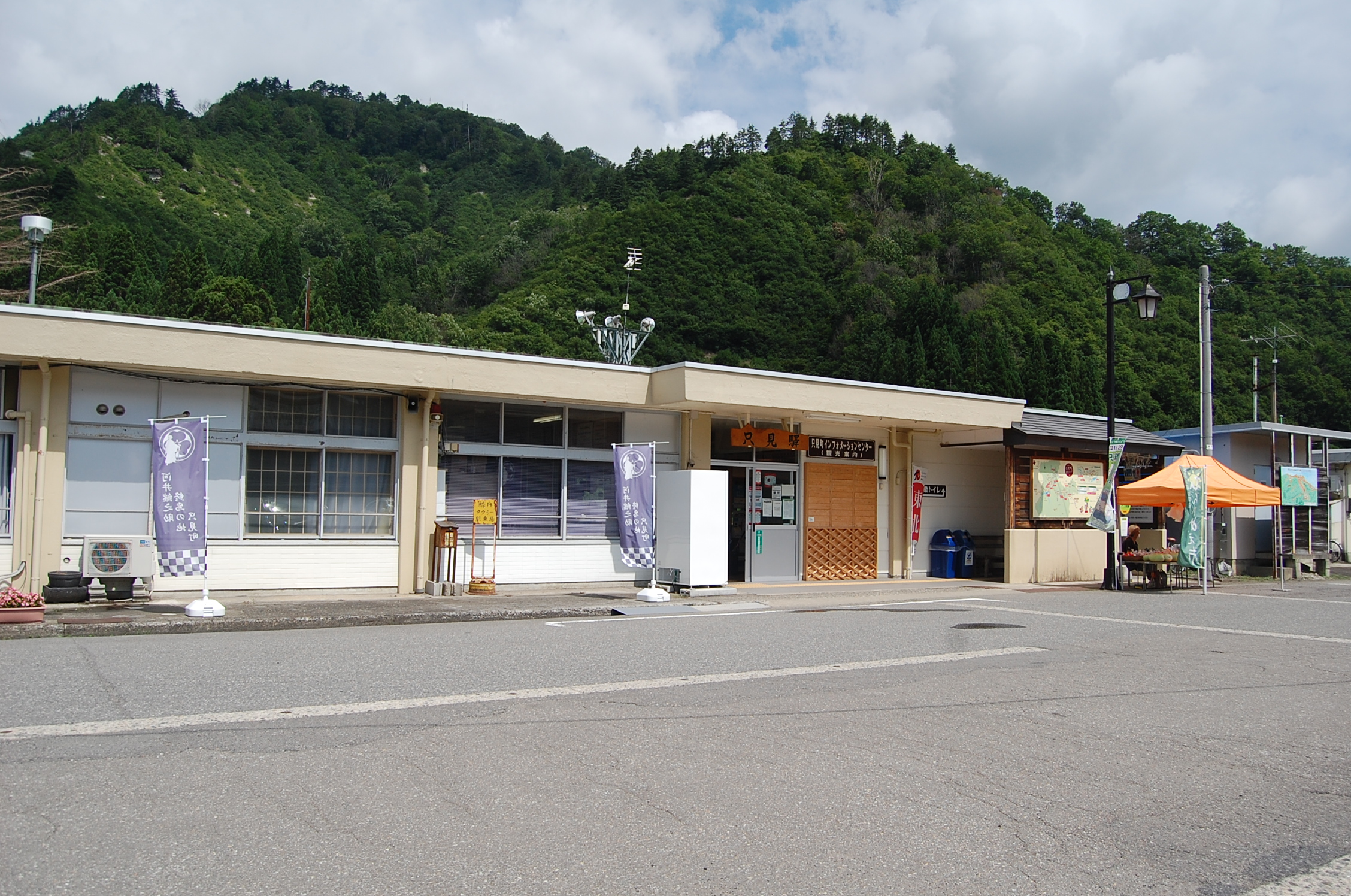
- Tadami Station in August 2021

General information
- Location: Tadami Uenohara 1827, Tadami-machi, Minamiaizu-gun, Fukushima-ken 968-0421; Japan
- Coordinates: 37.3503°N 139.3148°E
- Operator: JR East
- Line: ■ Tadami Line
- Distance: 88.4 km from Aizu-Wakamatsu
- Platforms: 1 island platform
- Tracks: 2

Other information
- Status: Staffed
- Website: Official website

History
- Opened: October 20, 1963

Passengers
- FY 2017: 22 (daily)

Services
Preceding station	JR East	Following station
Ōshirakawa towards Koide	Tadami Line	Aizu-Gamō towards Aizu-Wakamatsu
Location
- Location within Fukushima Prefecture Location within Japan

Tadami Station (只見駅, Tadami-eki) is a railway station on the Tadami Line in the town of Tadami, Minamiaizu District, Fukushima Prefecture, Japan, operated by East Japan Railway Company (JR East).

== Lines ==
Tadami Station is served by the Tadami Line, and is located 88.4 rail kilometers from the official starting point of the line at Aizu-Wakamatsu.

== Station layout ==
Tadami Station has a single island platform connected to the station building by a level crossing.

=== Platforms ===
station side	■ Tadami Line	for Aizu-Miyashita, Aizu-Bange and Aizu-Wakamatsu
opposite side	■ Tadami Line	for Koide

== History ==
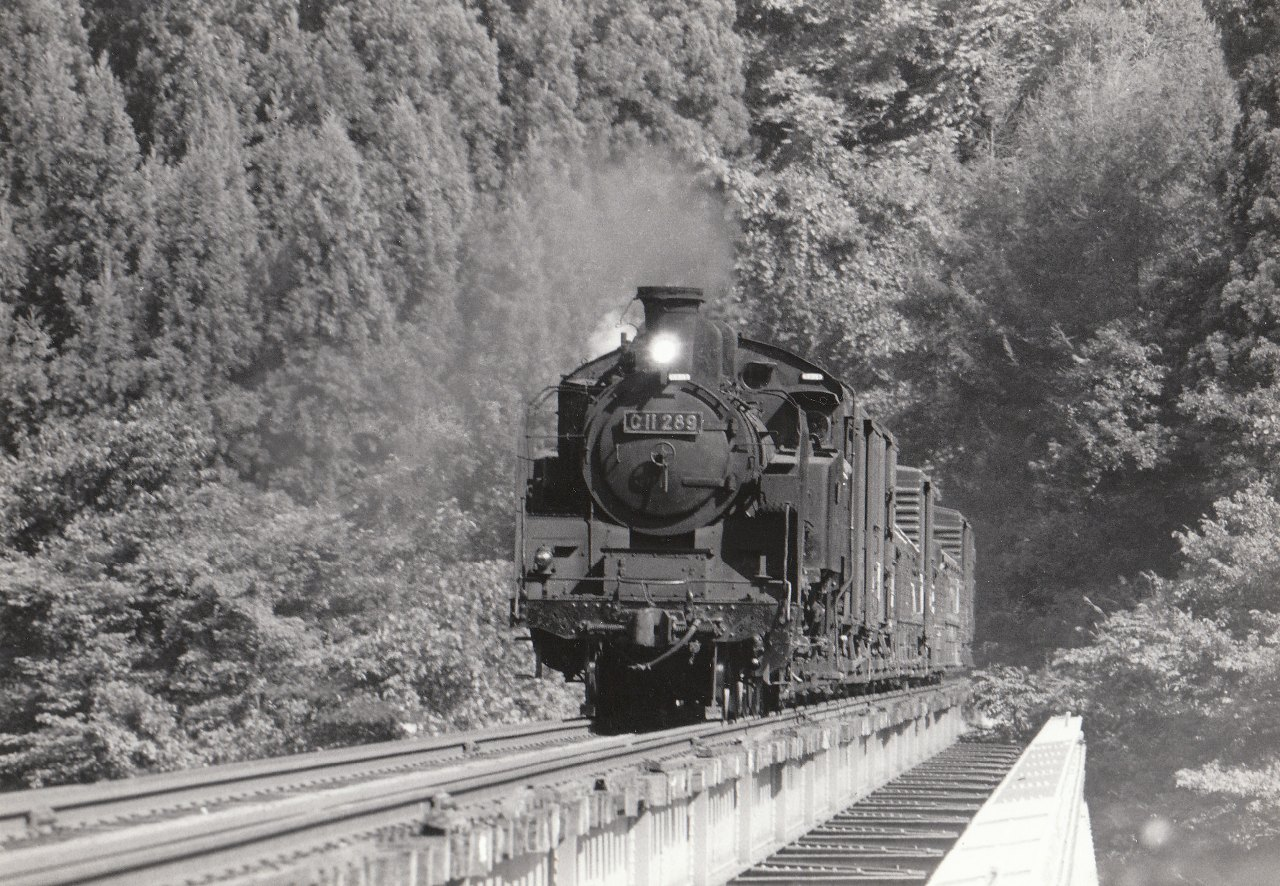
Freight train operated by JNR Class C11 steam locomotive running to Tadami Station (November 1973)

Tadami Station opened by the Japanese National Railways (JNR) on October 20, 1963, as the terminus of an extension of the eastern section of the Tadami Line from the previous terminus at Aizu-Kawaguchi. In 1971, the line was extended from Tadami to Oshirakawa, thus joining the previously disconnected western and eastern sections of the Tadami Line. The station was absorbed into the JR East network upon the privatization of the JNR on April 1, 1987.

Due to damage caused by torrential rainfall on July 30, 2011, services between Tadami and Aizu-Kawaguchi stations were replaced by a provisional bus service. The closed section resumed operations on 1 October 2022.

== Passenger statistics ==
In fiscal 2017, the station was used by an average of 22 passengers daily (boarding passengers only).

== Surrounding area ==
- Tadami Town Hall
- Tadami Post Office
- Tadami River
- National Route 252
- National Route 289

== Bus routes ==
- Shizen Shuto・Tadami
  - Tadami Station - Toki no Sato YURARI - Aizu Tadami Archaeological Museum - Kobayashi Snow Station - Minami Aizu Hospital - Aizu-Tajima Station
    - A flat rate of fares at 200 yen when use in Tadami. Fares costs 1500 yen to ride on between Minami-Aizu Town and Tadami Town.

== See also ==
- List of railway stations in Japan
