= Saitō Hajime =

Japanese samurai (1844–1915)

Hajime Saitō
- 斎藤 一
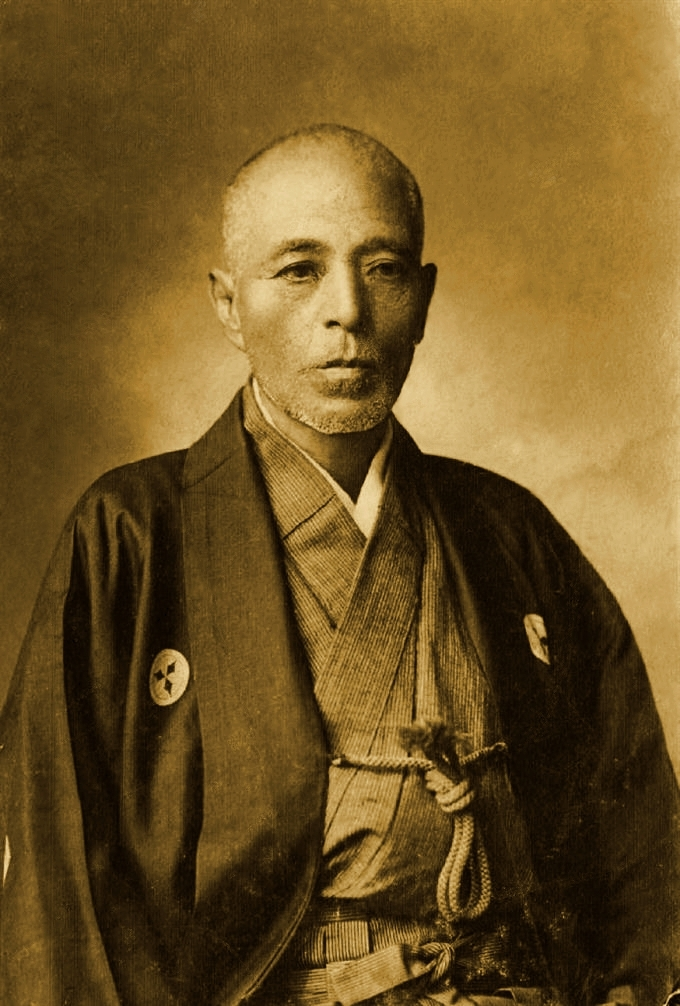
- Saitō Hajime in 1897
- Born: Hajime Yamaguchi; February 18, 1844; Edo, Japan
- Died: September 28, 1915 (aged 71); Tokyo, Japan
- Burial place: Amidaji, Aizuwakamatsu, Fukushima, Japan
- Other names: Yamaguchi Jirō; Ichinose Denpachi; Fujita Gorō
- Spouses: Shinoda Yaso (m. 1871–1874) Takagi Tokio (m. 1874)
- Children: Fujita Tsutomu (son); Fujita Tsuyoshi (son); Numazawa Tatsuo (son)
- Relatives: Yamaguchi Yūsuke (father); Masu (mother); Yamaguchi Hiroaki (brother); Soma Katsu (sister)
- Military career
- Allegiance: Tokugawa bakufu Aizu Domain
- Branch: Rōshigumi (former); Mibu Rōshigumi (former); Shinsengumi; Suzakutai
- Service years: 1862–1869
- Rank: Captain
- Commands: Shinsengumi third unit
- Conflicts: Ikedaya incident Kinmon incident Tenmaya incident Boshin War: Battle of Toba–Fushimi; Battle of Kōshū-Katsunuma; Battle of Shirakawa; Battle of Bonari Pass; Battle of Aizu; Satsuma Rebellion
- Other work: Police officer
- Status: Retired
- Police career
- Country: Tokyo
- Allegiance: Tokyo Metropolitan Government
- Department: Tokyo Metropolitan Police Department
- Service years: 1877–1890
- Rank: Police Inspector
- Other work: Guard at Tokyo National Museum (1890–1899); Clerk, accountant at Tokyo Women's Normal School (1899–1909)

Hajime Saitō (斎藤 一) (born Hajime Yamaguchi (山口 一); February 18, 1844 – September 28, 1915) was a Japanese samurai of the late Edo period, who most famously served as the captain of the third unit of the Shinsengumi. He was one of the few core members who survived the numerous wars of the Bakumatsu period. He was later known as Fujita Gorō (藤田 五郎) and worked as a police officer in Tokyo during the Meiji Restoration where he worked mostly undercover for them and for the Japanese government.

== Early years ==
He was born in Edo, Musashi Province (now Tokyo). Very little is known about his early life. He was born Yamaguchi Hajime (山口 一) to Yamaguchi Yūsuke (山口 祐助), an ashigaru of the Akashi Domain, who had bought the rank of gokenin (a low-ranking retainer directly serving the Tokugawa shōgun), and his wife Masu (ます). He had an older brother named Hiroaki and an older sister named Katsu. According to the published records of his family, Saitō left Edo in 1862, after accidentally killing a hatamoto. He went to Kyoto and taught in the dōjō of a man named Yoshida, who had relied on Saitō's father Yūsuke in the past. His style of swordsmanship is not clear. According to a tradition of his descendants, Saito Hajime's swordsmanship style is considered to be Mugai Ryū that originates from Yamaguchi Ittō-ryū. Thus the style derived from Ittō-ryū (One sword style). He is also considered to have learned Tsuda Ichi-den-ryū and Sekiguchi-ryū.

== Shinsengumi Period ==
The same age as Okita Sōji and another member named Tōdō Heisuke, the three shared the distinction of being the youngest in Kondō Isami's group and being among its most gifted swordsmen. As a member of the Shinsengumi, Saitō was said to be an introvert and a mysterious person; a common description of his personality says he "was not a man predisposed to small talk". Saitō was an unusually tall man at 5 feet 11 inches (180 cm). He was also noted to be very dignified, especially in his later years. He always made sure that his obi was tied properly and when he walked he was careful not to drag his feet. At rest he always sat in the formal position, called seiza, and he would remain very alert so that he could react instantly to any situations that might occur.

He was, however, known to be very intimidating when he wanted to be. Along with his duties as Captain of the Third Squad in the Shinsengumi, he was also responsible for weeding out any potential spies within the Shinsengumi ranks. Members had to constantly be mindful of what they said around him.

His original position within the Shinsengumi was assistant vice commander (副長助勤, fukuchō jokin). His duties included being a kenjutsu instructor. During the Ikedaya incident on July 8, 1864, Saitō was with Hijikata Toshizō's group that arrived later at the Ikedaya Inn.

On August 20, 1864, Saitō and the rest of the Shinsengumi took part in the Kinmon incident against the Chōshū rebels. In the reorganization of the ranks in November 1864, he was first assigned as the fourth unit's captain and would later receive an award from the shogunate for his part in the Kinmon incident.

At the Shinsengumi new headquarters at Nishi Hongan-ji in April 1865, he was assigned as the third unit's captain. Saitō was considered to be on the same level of swordsmanship as the first troop captain Okita Sōji and the second troop captain Nagakura Shinpachi. In fact, it is rumoured that Okita feared his sword skill.

Despite prior connections to Aizu, his descendants dispute that he served as a spy. His controversial reputation comes from accounts that he executed several corrupt members of the Shinsengumi; however, rumors vary as to his role in the deaths of Tani Sanjūrō in 1866 and Takeda Kanryūsai in 1867. His role as an internal spy for the Shinsengumi is also questionable; one common example being that he is said to have been instructed to join Itō Kashitarō's splinter group Goryō Eji Kōdai-ji faction, to spy on them, which eventually led to the Aburanokōji incident on December 13, 1867. However, this is disputed by Abe Jūrō, who did not believe he was a spy. It is probable that he also monitored other intelligence and enemy activity.

Together with the rest of the Shinsengumi, he became a hatamoto in 1867. Later in late December 1867, Saitō and a group of six Shinsengumi members were assigned to protect Miura Kyūtarō, who was one of the major suspects of the assassination of Sakamoto Ryōma. On January 1, 1868, they fought against sixteen assassins who were trying to kill Miura in revenge at the Tenmaya Inn on what was known as the Tenmaya incident.

After the outbreak of the Boshin War from January 27, 1868 onwards, Saitō, under the name Yamaguchi Jirō (山口 次郎), took part in Shinsengumi's fight during the Battle of Toba–Fushimi and the Battle of Kōshū-Katsunuma, before withdrawing with the surviving members to Edo and later to the Aizu domain.

Due to Hijikata being incapacitated as a result of the injuries sustained at the Battle of Utsunomiya Castle, Saitō became the commander of the Aizu Shinsengumi around May 26, 1868 and continued on into the Battle of Shirakawa. After the Battle of Bonari Pass, when Hijikata decided to retreat from Aizu, Saitō and a small group of 20 members parted with Hijikata and rest of the surviving Shinsengumi and continued to fight alongside the Aizu army against the imperial army until the very end of the Battle of Aizu. This parting account was recorded in Kuwana retainer Taniguchi Shirōbei's diary, where it was recorded as an occurrence also involving Ōtori Keisuke, whom Hijikata requested to take command of the Shinsengumi; thus the said confrontation was not with Hijikata. However, questions regarding this parting remain, especially considering the conflicting dates.

Saitō, along with the few remaining men of the Shinsengumi who went with him, fought against the imperial army at Nyorai-dō (a small temple near Aizuwakamatsu Castle), where they were severely outnumbered. It was at the Battle of Nyorai-dō that Saitō was thought to have been killed in action; however, he managed to get back to Aizu lines and joined the Aizu domain's military as a member of the Suzakutai. After Aizuwakamatsu Castle fell, Saitō and the five surviving members joined a group of former Aizu retainers who traveled southwest to the Takada Domain in Echigo Province, where they were held as prisoners of war. In the records listing the Aizu men detained in Takada, Saitō is on record as Ichinose Denpachi.

== Meiji Restoration ==
Saitō, under the new name Fujita Gorō (藤田 五郎), traveled to Tonami, the new domain of the Matsudaira clan of Aizu. He took up residence with Kurasawa Heijiemon, the Aizu karō who was an old friend of his from Kyoto. Kurasawa was involved in the migration of Aizu samurai to Tonami and the building up of the settlements in Tonami (now Aomori Prefecture), particularly in Gonohe village. In Tonami, Fujita met Shinoda Yaso, the daughter of an Aizu retainer. The two met through Kurasawa, who was then living with Ueda Shichirō, another Aizu retainer. Kurasawa sponsored Fujita and Yaso's marriage on August 25, 1871; the couple lived in Kurasawa's house. It was also around this time that Fujita may have become associated with the Police Bureau. Fujita and Yaso moved out of the Kurasawa house on February 10, 1873, and started living in the Ueda household. When on June 10, 1874, he left Tonami for Tokyo, Yaso moved in with Kurasawa and the Kurasawa family records last entry of her is in 1876. It is unknown what happened afterwards. It was around this time Fujita Gorō began to work as a police officer in the Tokyo Metropolitan Police Department.

In 1874, Fujita married Takagi Tokio. Tokio was the daughter of Takagi Kojūrō, a retainer of the Aizu domain. Her original name was Sada; she served for a time as lady-in-waiting to Matsudaira Teru. The marriage is believed to have been sponsored by the former Aizu karō Yamakawa Hiroshi and Sagawa Kanbei as well as the former lord of Aizu Matsudaira Katamori. Fujita and Tokio had three children: Tsutomu (1876–1956); Tsuyoshi (1879–1946); and Tatsuo (1886–1945). Tsutomu and his wife Nishino Midori had seven children; the Fujita family continues to the present day through Tarō and Naoko Fujita, the children of Tsutomu's second son Makoto. Fujita's third son Tatsuo was adopted by the Numazawa family, Tokio's maternal relatives (another family of Aizu karō) whose family had nearly been wiped out in the Boshin War.

During his lifetime, Fujita Gorō shared some of his Shinsengumi experiences with a select few, these included Aizu natives Yamakawa Kenjirō and Takamine Hideo, whose houses he frequented. He would drink sake with Yamakawa and Takamine and tell stories of his past. However, he did not write anything about his activity in the Shinsengumi as Nagakura Shinpachi did. During his life in the Meiji period, Fujita was the only one who was authorized by the government to carry a katana despite the collapse of the Tokugawa rule. In 1875, Fujita assisted Nagakura Shinpachi (as Sugimura Yoshie) and Matsumoto Ryōjun in setting up a memorial monument known as Grave of Shinsengumi in honor of Kondō Isami, Hijikata Toshizō, and other deceased Shinsengumi members at Itabashi, Tokyo.

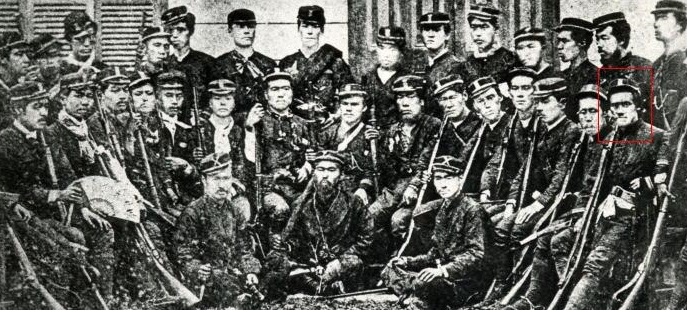
Photo believed to depict Saitō Hajime (as Fujita Gorō) (bottom right encircled) with his police troop.

Fujita fought on the Meiji government's side during Saigō Takamori's Satsuma rebellion in 1877, as a member of the police forces sent to support the Imperial Japanese Army.

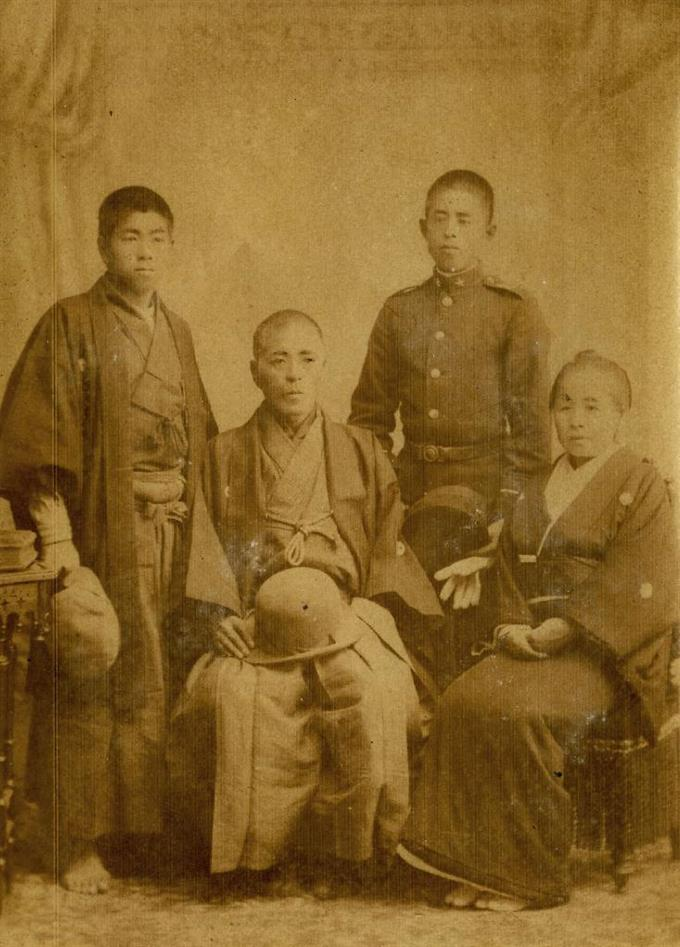
Saitō (as Fujita Gorō), 53, is seated with his second son Tsuyoshi, his eldest son Tsutomu, and his wife Tokio in 1897, his third son Tatsuo (not pictured) had since adopted into the Numazawa family

Following his retirement from Tokyo Metropolitan Police Department in 1890, Fujita worked as a guard for Tokyo National Museum, and later as a clerk and accountant for Tokyo Women's Normal School from 1899, as well as for the Tokyo Higher Normal School, jobs he secured thanks to his friendship with Takamine Hideo. Takamine also relied upon Fujita's skill as an appraiser of swords, and gave Fujita permission to freely enter his art warehouse.

== Death ==
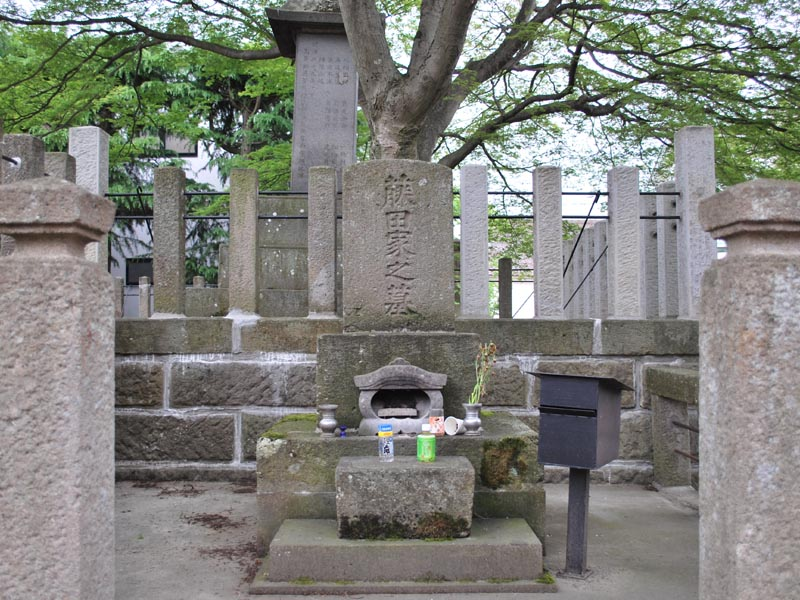
Saito's grave at Amidaji, Aizuwakamatsu, Fukushima, Japan in 2008

Fujita's heavy drinking was believed to have contributed to his death from a stomach ulcer. He died in 1915 at age 72, sitting in seiza in his living room. Upon his will, he was buried at Amidaji, Aizuwakamatsu, Fukushima, Japan.

== Saitō in fiction ==
He has featured in several anime and manga, and is also prominent in other media about the Shinsengumi.

Saitō's appearance in Nobuhiro Watsuki's Rurouni Kenshin series is likely the best-known of his manga and anime incarnations. The series introduces Saitō as an anti-hero and eventual ally to the protagonist Himura Kenshin, and depicts several of the known historical descriptions of him from real life, from his personality and role in the Shinsengumi to his being left-handed. As Watsuki is a self-proclaimed Hijikata Toshizō fan, Saitō makes in-series call-backs to his time in the Shinsengumi by peddling Hijikata's ishida san'yaku powdered medicine as a cover, and states that his Gatotsu attack is a perfected version of Hijikata's Hiratsuki. His famous 'swift death to evil' (aku soku zan) motto in the series was also the theme of an entry in the 2000 International Obfuscated C Code Contest, in which a series of programmed source code featuring his anime portrait in ASCII Art wrote other programs that eventually formed a loop spelling out aku soku zan. In the 2012 live-action film adaptation and its sequels Saitō is played by Yōsuke Eguchi.

Keiichiro Washizuka of The Last Blade games invokes Saitō Hajime's design in the Rurouni Kenshin: Trust & Betrayal OVA while also sporting Kenshin's famous scar. He fights with a series of ‘sliding charge’ attacks that resemble the Gatotsu.

He is parodied in the anime Gintama as Saitō Shimaru, a narcoleptic with a fear of speaking. In the series, he holds the role of an internal investigator of the Shinsengumi, a post he was said to have held in real life, and is also regarded as its most deadly member by Okita Sougo, the Gintama proxy of Okita Sōji.

Saitō is the third unit captain of the Shinsengumi in Peacemaker Kurogane. Here he is perpetually sleepy with droopy eyes and a soft voice and the supernatural ability to see ghosts. And similar to his depiction in Rurouni Kenshin, he is shown with a fondness for soba.

He is portrayed as a quiet and serious spy in Kaze Hikaru. He is also the protagonist of the manga Burai, a fictional story about the Shinsengumi during the later part of the Tokugawa shogunate.

Saitō is featured in the manga Getsumei Seiki, in later episodes of the anime Shura no Toki: Age of Chaos, and the video game series Bakumatsu Renka Shinsengumi and Code of the Samurai.

In the 2003 Japanese film When the Last Sword Is Drawn, Saitō is played by Kōichi Satō. At first, Sato portrays Saitō as a cold, dark, uncaring captain of the Shinsengumi. However, Saitō changes as a man through his interactions with Kanichiro Yoshimura (played by Kiichi Nakai) during the last years of the Shinsengumi.

Saitō Hajime is also shown in the Hakuōki Shinsengumi Kitan otome visual novel games, as well as its film, anime, and manga adaptations. Here, like his historical inspiration, he is very reserved and analytical, using a left-handed sword technique and later joining Itō's splinter group at the order of Hijikata.

He appears in several NHK productions. In the 2004 NHK Taiga drama Shinsengumi! Saitō is played by Joe Odagiri. Shinji Ozeki portrayed Saitō in the 2011 adaptation Shinsengumi Keppūroku. In the 2013 Taiga drama Yae no Sakura, he is played by Kenji Furuya of Dragon Ash, and Shugo Oshinari portrays him in one episode of the NHK historical documentary series Rekishi Hiwa Historia.

Saitō also appears in Ryū ga Gotoku: Ishin! and its remake Like a Dragon: Ishin!, where he is portrayed as a false identity of the game's version of Sakamoto Ryōma.

Saitō also appears in the mobile game Fate/Grand Order as a limited 4-Star Saber-class Servant which debuted during the GUDAGUDA Yamatai-koku 2020 event.

Saito appeared in the 2024 drama "With You I Bloom: The Shinsengumi Youth Chronicle" based on the 1963 Shinsengumi manga by Osamu Tezuka. He was portrayed by Kohei Shoji.

== Notes ==
=== References ===
- Kikuchi Akira (2003). "Saitō Hajime no Aizu-sensō," pp. 110–135 in Shinsengumi Saitō Hajime no Subete. (Tokyo: Shin Jinbutsu Ōraisha).
- Itō Tetsuya (2003). "Saitō Hajime nenfu," p. 223-243 in Shinsengumi Saitō Hajime no Subete. (Tokyo: Shin Jinbutsu Ōraisha).
- Itō Tetsuya (2003). "Takada kinshin kara Tonami zaijūroku," pp. 136–149 in Shinsengumi Saitō Hajime no Subete. (Tokyo: Shin Jinbutsu Ōraisha).
- Nagaya Yoshie (2003). "Saitō Hajime no shūhen (shutsuji to sono kakeizu)," pp. 27–37 in Shinsengumi Saitō Hajime no Subete. (Tokyo: Shin Jinbutsu Ōraisha).
- Shinsengumi Encyclopedia. Tokyo: Shin Jinbutsu Oraisha, 1978.
- Tōdō Toshihisa (2003). "Saitō Hajime kanren jinbutsu jiten," pp. 193–206 in Shinsengumi Saitō Hajime no Subete. (Tokyo: Shin Jinbutsu Ōraisha).
- Yamamura Tatsuya (1998). Shinsengumi Kenkyaku-Den. Tokyo: PHP Interface. ISBN 4-569-60176-6
- 幕臣取り立て at www.geocities.jp
