= Battle of Aizu =

1868 battle of the Boshin War

- Part of The Boshin War
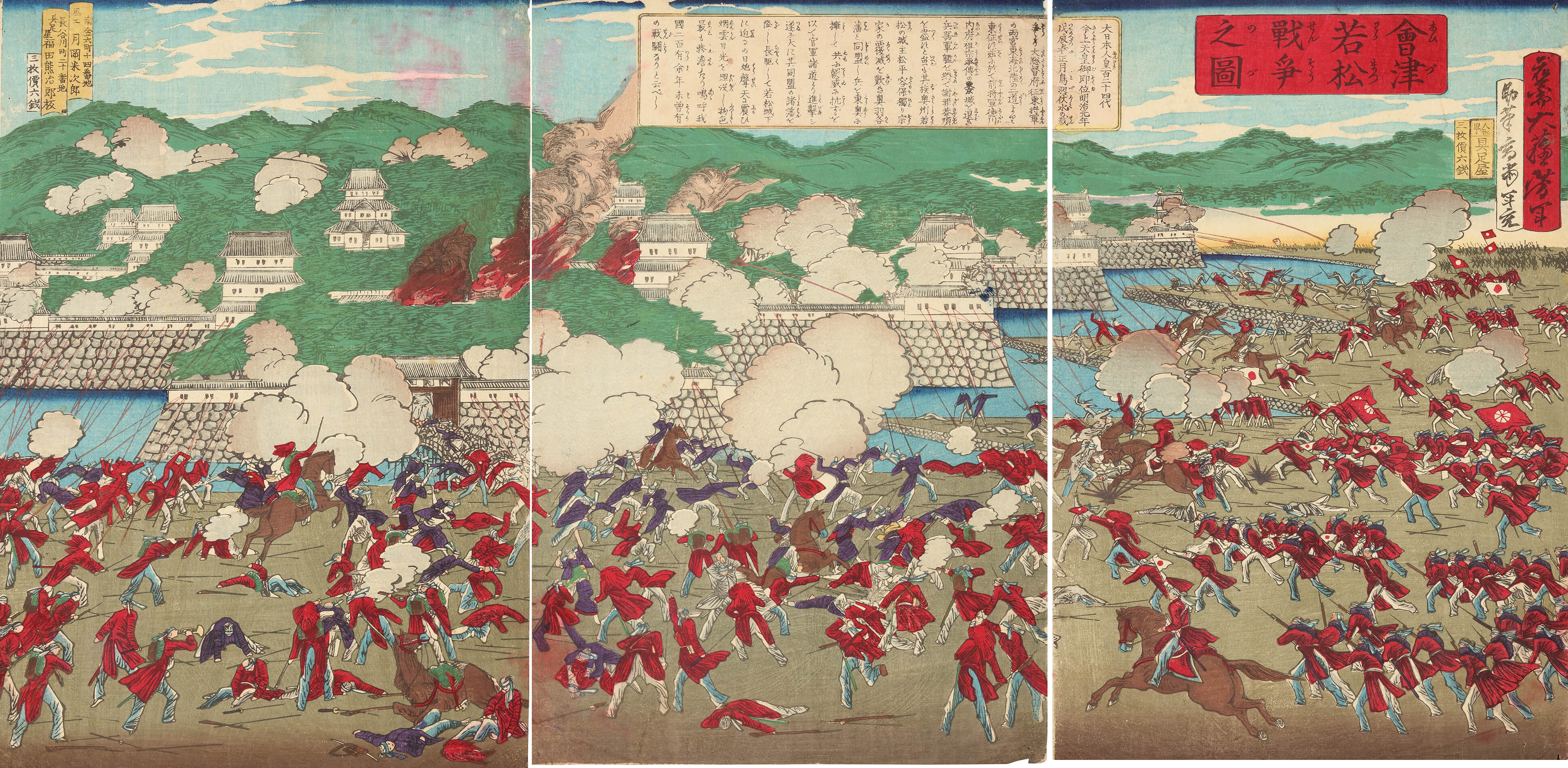
- Attack of the Aizu-Wakamatsu castle during the Battle of Aizu.
Date	October 6, 1868 – November 6, 1868
Location	Aizu 37.30°N 139.56°E
Result	Imperial victory

Belligerents
Imperial faction: Satsuma Domain; Chōshū Domain; Tosa Domain; Hiroshima Domain; Ōgaki Domain; Sadowara Domain; Kiheitai; Jinshotai; Shin'itai	Shogunate faction: Northern Alliance; Aizu Domain; Shinsengumi; Shōgitai; Jōshitai; Yūgekitai

Commanders and leaders
Satchōdo Army: Saionji Kinmochi; Itagaki Taisuke; Yamagata Aritomo; Ijichi Masaharu; Kuroda Kiyotaka; Kirino Toshiaki; Sharpshooters: Murata Tsuneyoshi	Matsudaira Katamori; Saigō Tanomo; Yamakawa Hiroshi; Kayano Gonbei; Tanaka Tosa †; Saitō Hajime; Nakano Takeko †

Strength
15,000 combatants 75,000 reinforcement	5,000 combatants (9,400 in total: 3,500 clans soldiers, 5,900 samurais, dozens of female warriors)

Casualties and losses
Unknown	2,977 killed

The Battle of Aizu (Japanese: 会津戦争, romanized: Aizu sensō, lit. 'War of Aizu') was fought in northern Japan from October to November in autumn 1868, and was part of the Boshin War.

== History ==
Aizu was known for its martial skill, and maintained at any given time a standing army of over 5000. It was often deployed to security operations on the northern fringes of the country, as far north as southern Sakhalin. Also, in the period immediately before, during, and after Commodore Perry's arrival, Aizu had a presence in security operations around Edo Bay.

During the tenure of the 9th generation lord Matsudaira Katamori, the domain deployed massive amounts of their troops to Kyoto, where Katamori served as Kyoto Shugoshoku. Earning the hatred of the Chōshū domain, and alienating his ally, the Satsuma domain, Katamori retreated with the shōgun Tokugawa Yoshinobu in 1868.

Though the Satchōdo controlled Imperial Court, following Yoshinobu's resignation, called for the punishment of Katamori and Aizu as "enemies of the Court," (朝敵) he took great pains to demonstrate Aizu's submission to the new Imperialist government, finally acquiescing to calls for war later in 1868, during the Boshin War. Though the Aizu forces fought as part of the greater efforts of the Ōuetsu Reppan Dōmei, they were eventually abandoned (after the loss at the Battle of Bonari Pass) by the forces of the former Bakufu under Ōtori Keisuke. Aizu, now fighting alone, had its forces besieged at Tsuruga Castle, the seat of the Aizu domain, on October 6, 1868. This was the start of a month-long siege.

A detached unit from the Byakkotai ("White Tiger Company") — young, predominantly teenage, samurai — are famous for having committed seppuku (a form of ritual suicide) on Mount Iimori, overlooking the castle. Because of the smoke from the burning castle town, which was in between them and the castle itself, they mistakenly assumed that the castle had fallen to the Satchōdo forces. Their story is known because of the only one among them whose suicide was unsuccessful: Iinuma Sadakichi.

A remnant of Shinsengumi, a special police force which Aizu had supervised while in Kyoto, was present at the battle, under the command of Saitō Hajime. In addition, survivors from the Shōgitai engaged in the fighting, as did the Tosa Jinshōtai and the Shin'itai, a regiment of Shintō priests performing the role of spiritual advisors to the attacking Imperial forces.

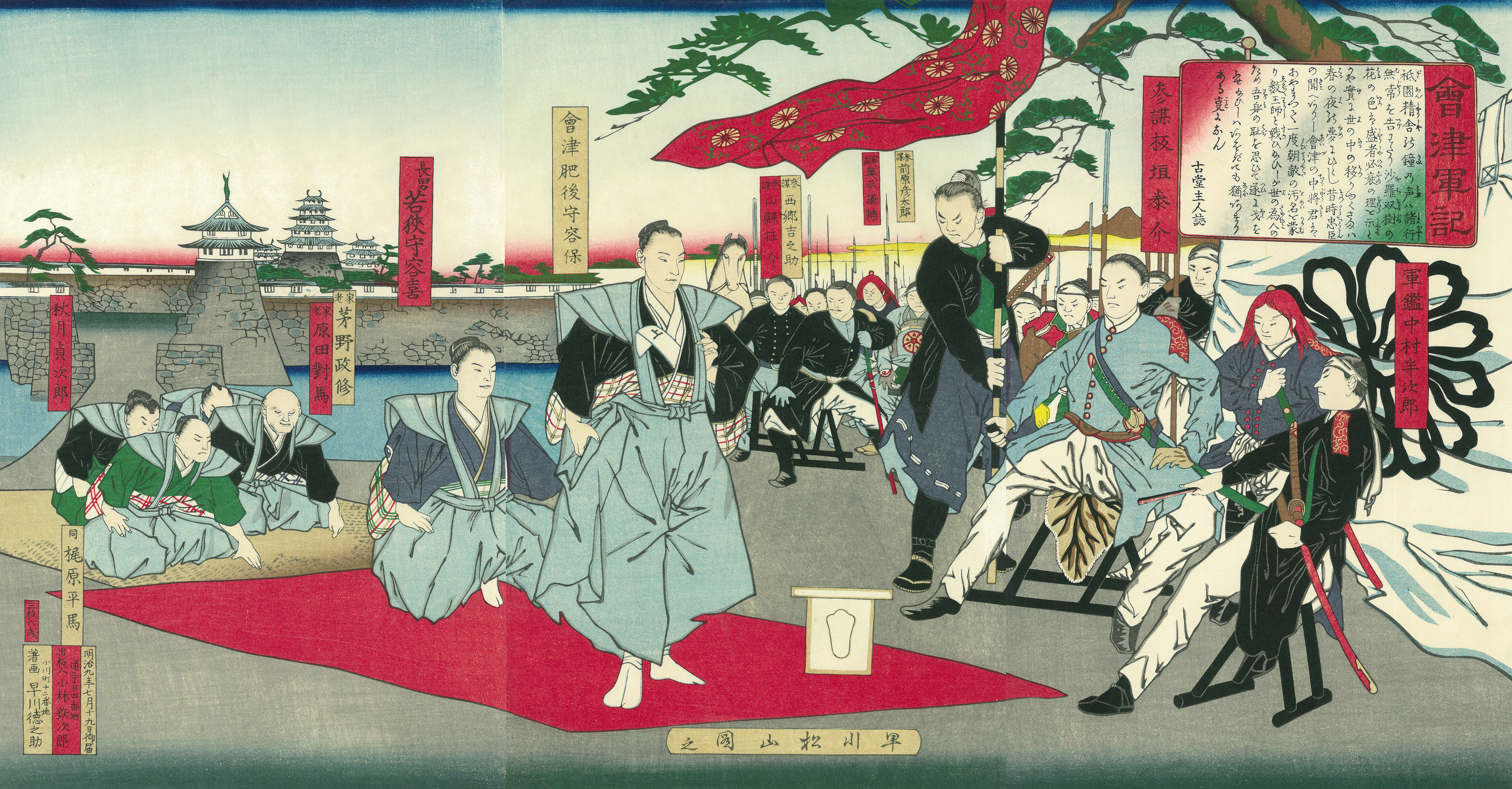
Itagaki Taisuke and Matsudaira Katamori（Battle of Aizu）

After a month under siege, on November 6, 1868, Aizu officials agreed to surrender, through the mediation of their neighbor, the Yonezawa Domain. Soon after, Matsudaira Katamori, his son Nobunori, and the senior retainers came before the imperial commanders in person, and offered their unconditional surrender. The samurai population was sent away to prisoner of war camps in the Tsugaru Peninsula, and the Aizu domain, as it had been since the mid-17th century, ceased to exist.

== Gallery ==
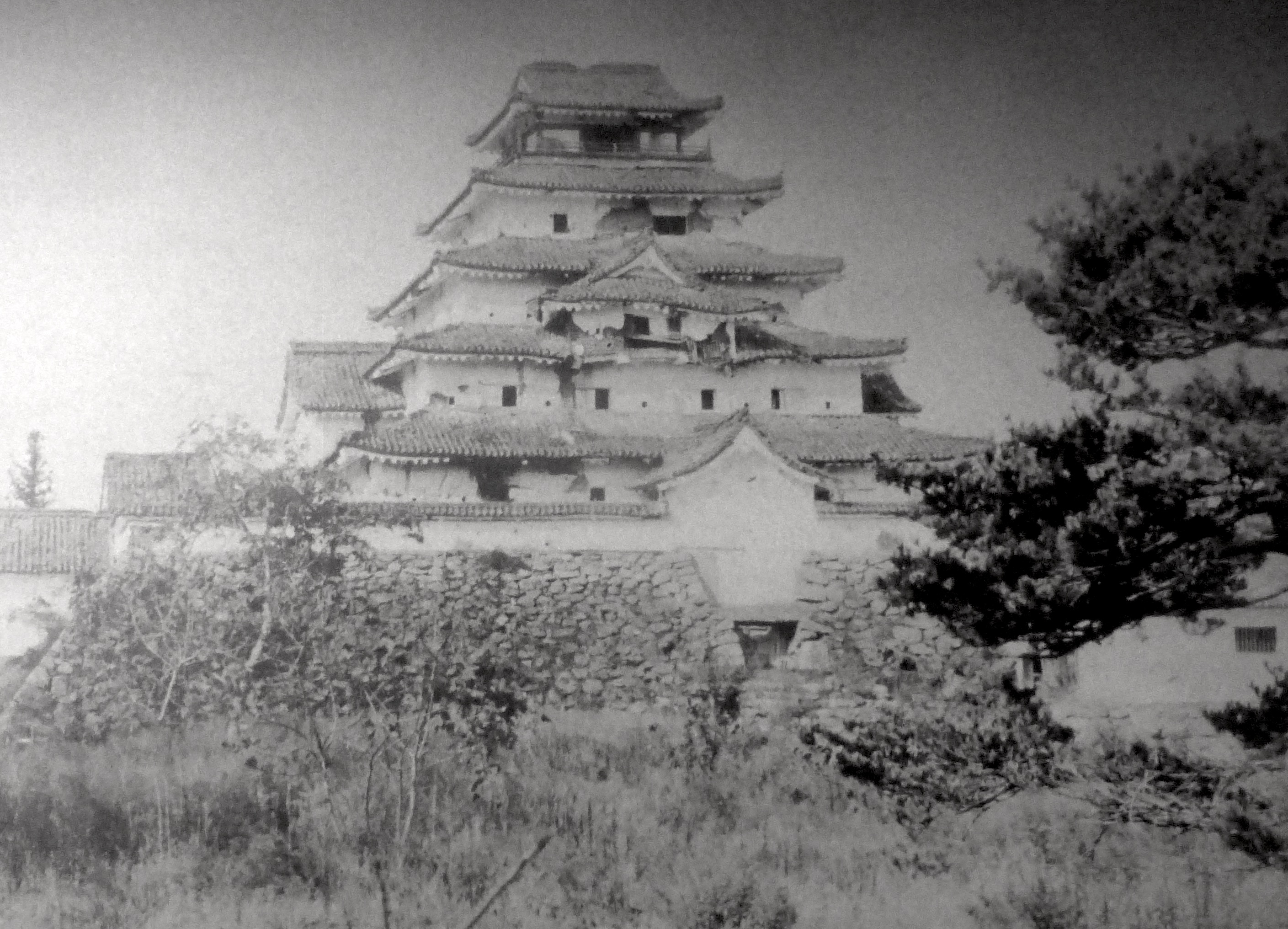
The damaged Aizu-Wakamatsu castle right after the Battle of Aizu

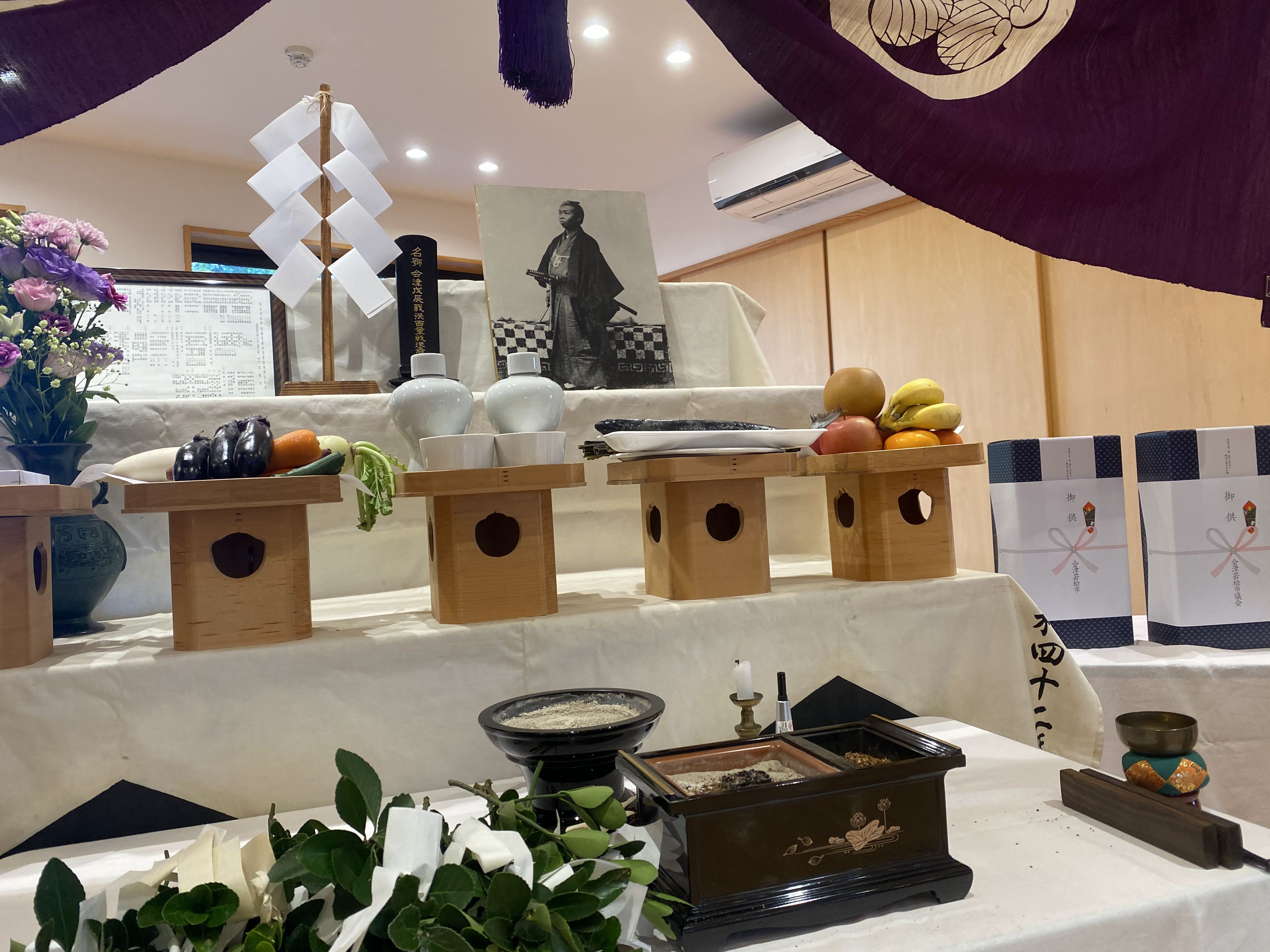
Memorial service for the Boshin war dead the Imperial Army in Aizu

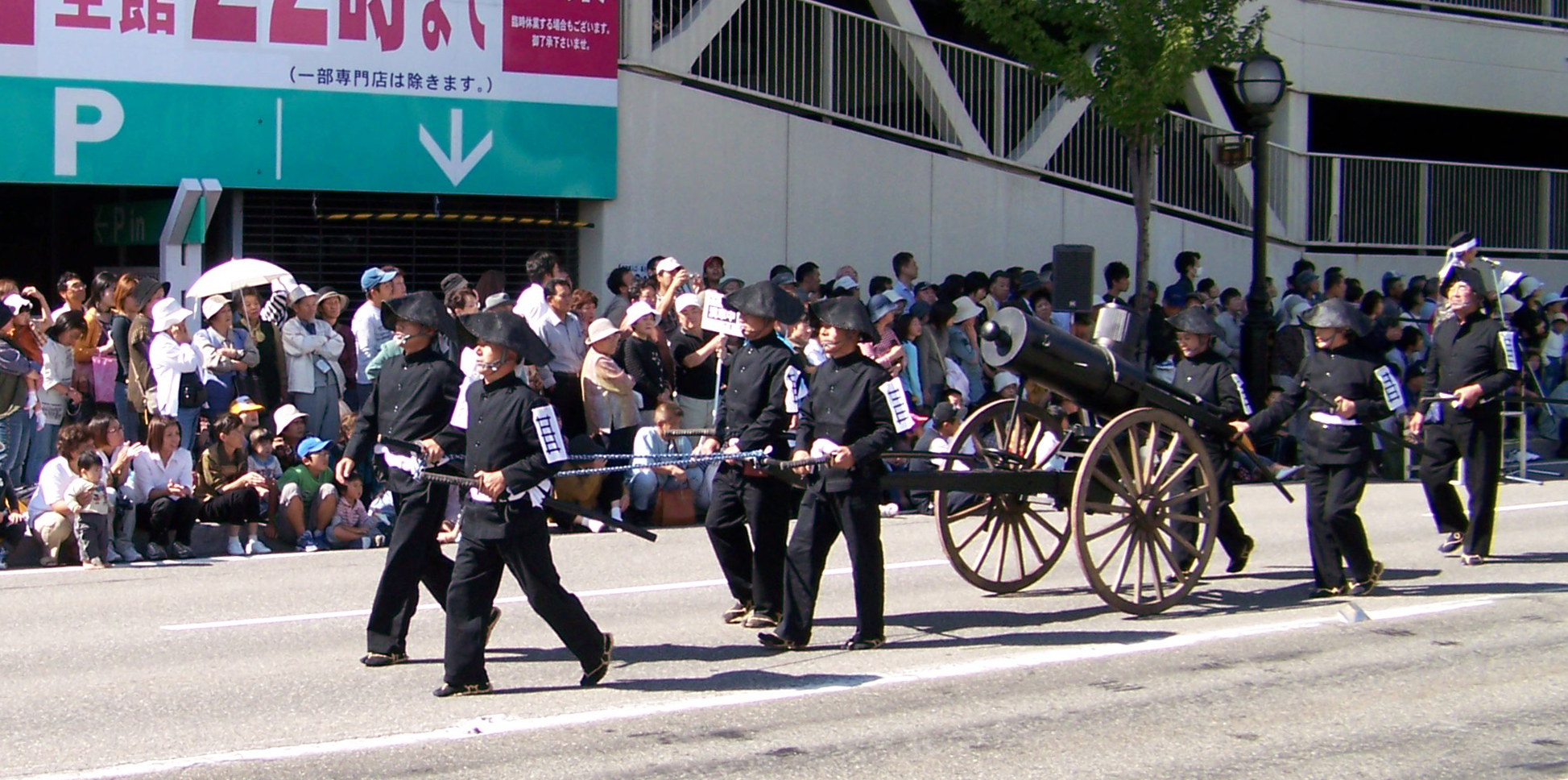
Reenactment of Aizu cannoneers during the Boshin war.

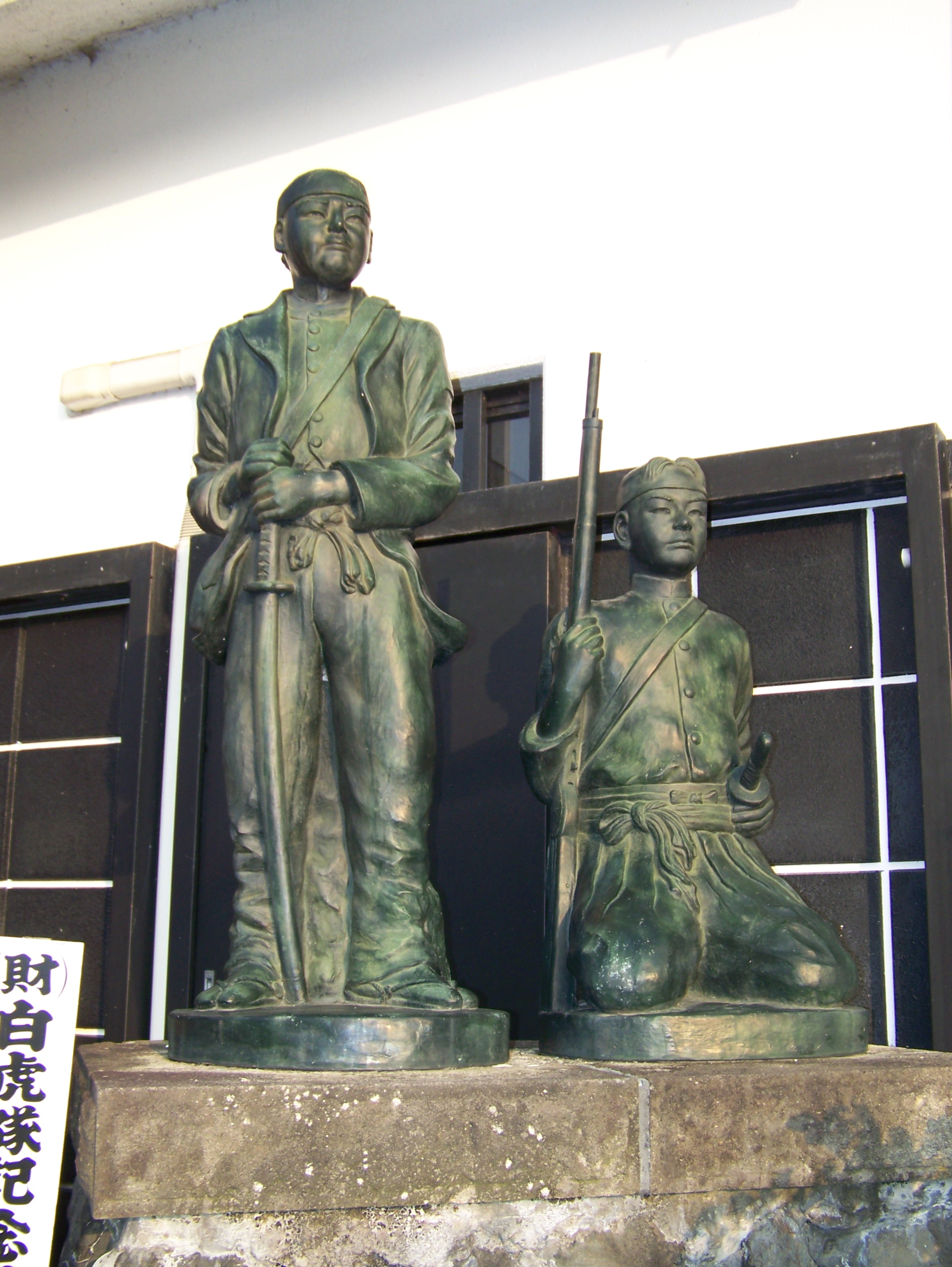
Byakkotai warriors

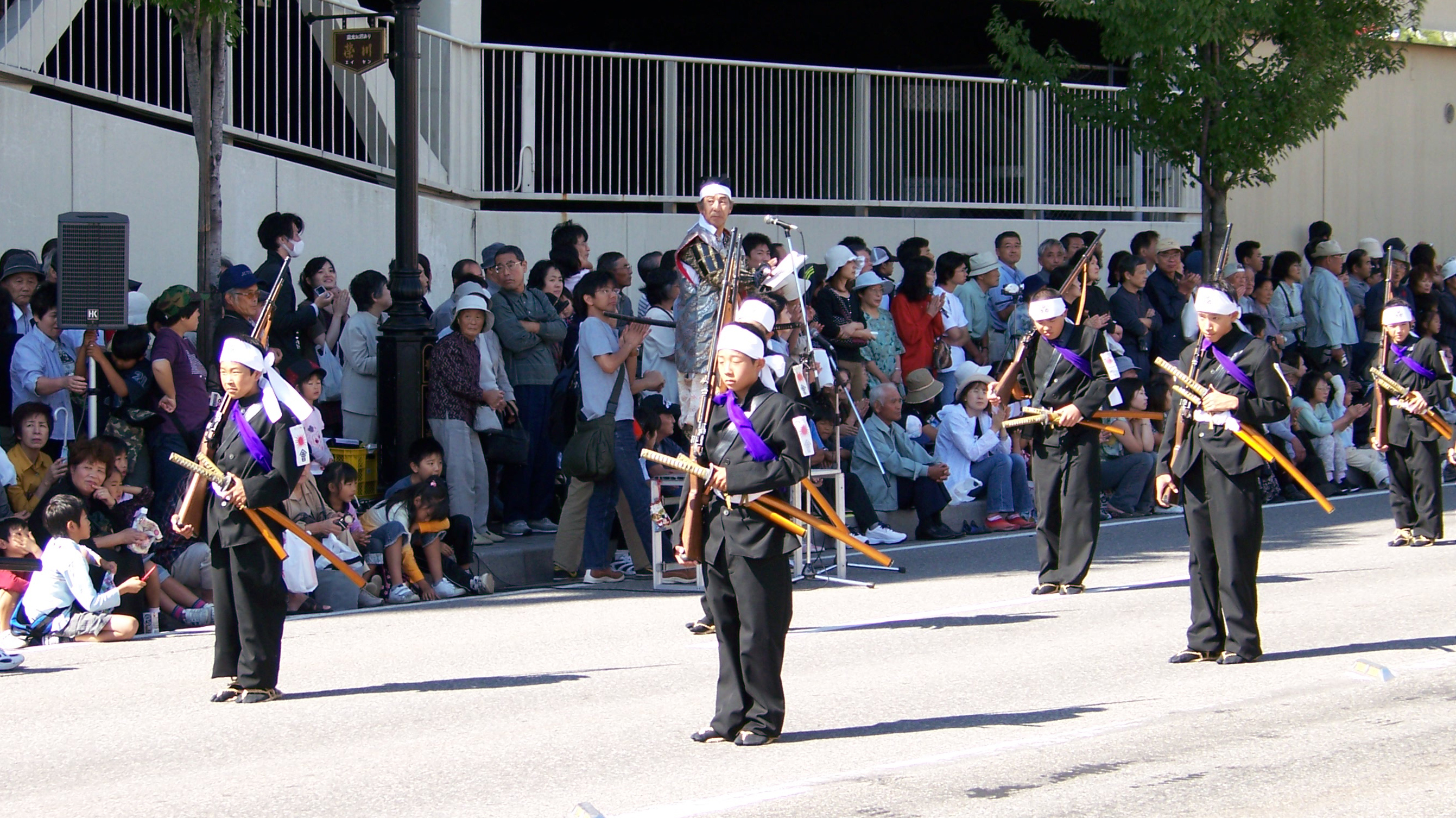
Reenactment of young Aizu warriors during the Boshin war.

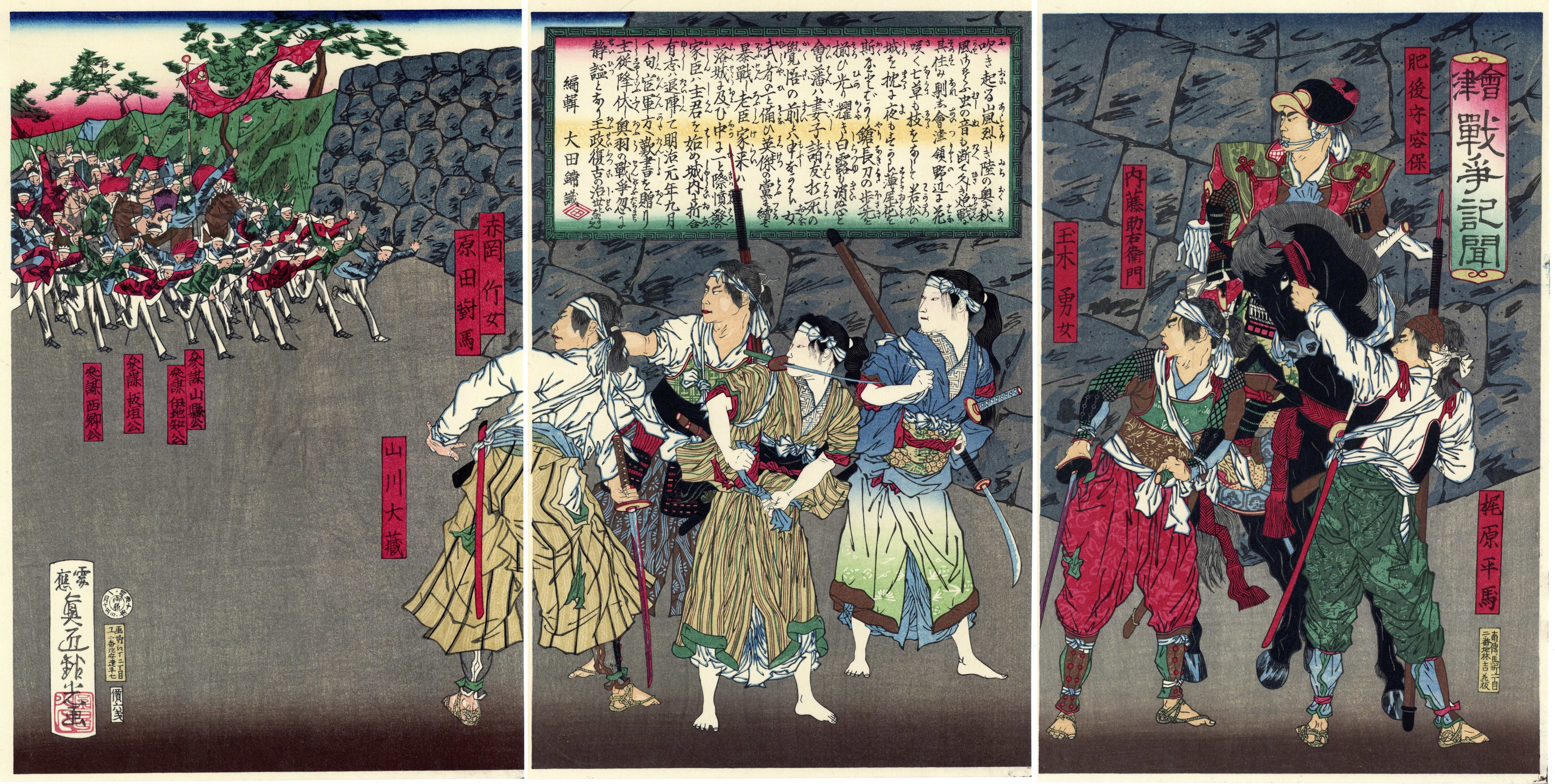
Aizu War Records by Adachi Ginko 1877
