= Saigō Tanomo =

Japanese samurai

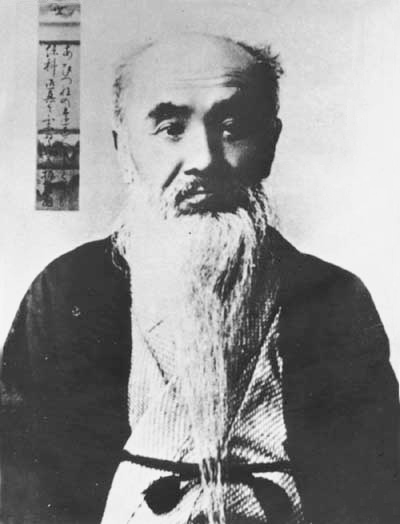
- Born: May 16, 1830; Wakamatsu, Aizu domain, Japan
- Died: April 28, 1903 (aged 72); Japan
- Military career
- Allegiance: Aizu domain
- Service years: 1860–1869
- Rank: karō (senior councilor)
- Conflicts: Battle of Shirakawa, Battle of Aizu, Battle of Hakodate
- Other work: Priest at Tōshō-gū Shrine

Saigō Tanomo (西郷 頼母; May 16, 1830 – April 28, 1903) was a Japanese samurai of the late Edo period. Chief senior councilor (hittōgarō 筆頭家老) of the Aizu clan, he achieved fame due to his distinguished action in the Boshin War. He adopted the name Hoshina Chikanori (保科 近野里). Surviving the war, he became a Shinto priest, and achieved renown as a martial artist. He is considered one of the teachers of the famed Takeda Sōkaku.

== Early life and service ==
Succeeding to family headship and the position of chief senior councilor in 1860, he served the 9th generation Aizu daimyō, Matsudaira Katamori. However, with Katamori's selection for the post of Kyoto Shugoshoku in 1862, his views sharply diverged with those of his lord. Wanting to warn Katamori of the dangers of Aizu's deeper political involvement in the troubled Tokugawa regime, he and his fellow karō Tanaka Tosa rode nonstop from Aizu to Edo and spoke directly to Katamori. The lord, while understanding Tanomo's views as well as the domain's financial situation, nevertheless could not disobey what was both a direct shogunal order as well as part of the greater scheme put together by his colleagues (Hitotsubashi Yoshinobu and Matsudaira Yoshinaga), and so he dismissed Tanomo. Tanomo thus spent the following six years in Aizu, informally dismissed from his position.

== Boshin War ==
In 1868, with the rout at the Battle of Toba–Fushimi, and with Katamori back in Aizu for the first time in years, Tanomo's services were again called upon. While he recommended submission to the Imperial Army early in 1868, the arrival in Aizu of former Bakufu soldiers forced Aizu's hand in the direction of continued military action. Once again, Tanomo's voice was drowned out. During the Battle of Aizu, Tanomo fought in defense of the castle town of Aizu-Wakamatsu, the women of Tanomo's family are still famous in the region for having committed mass suicide.

Just before the surrender, Tanomo escaped Aizu and headed for Sendai. Joining Enomoto Takeaki and Hijikata Toshizō there, he continued on to Hokkaidō, where he joined in the military efforts of the Ezo Republic, but was defeated together with its forces in 1869.

== Later life ==
After spending a few years in prison, Tanomo was released in 1872, and subsequently opened up a private academy in the Izu region. In 1889, he was chosen as one of the head priests of Tōshō-gū Shrine in Nikkō, where he served alongside his former lord Matsudaira Katamori, and Katamori's brother Matsudaira Sadaaki. In his later years, Tanomo also taught Takeda Sōkaku, the teacher of Ueshiba Morihei. Retiring in 1899, Tanomo returned to Aizu, where he died in 1903 at the age of 72.

The book Seiun-ki (栖雲記, "A Record of Cobweb-clouds"), written shortly before Tanomo's death, records his memoirs.

== In popular culture ==
- Saigō was portrayed by the actor Toshiyuki Nishida in the 2013 NHK taiga drama Yae no Sakura.
- Byakkotai(1986) - Kotaro Satomi.

== See also ==
- Aizu Domain Samurai Residence
