= Sacu (disambiguation) =

The SACU or Southern African Customs Union is a customs union of five Southern African countries.

SACU or Sacu may also refer to:

- Sacu, a commune in Caraș-Severin County, Romania
- Society for Anglo-Chinese Understanding, a United Kingdom nonprofit organization
- Southern African Community USA, American nonprofit organization

== See also ==
- Saku
- Secu, a commune in Dolj, Romania
