= Wakamatsu Tea and Silk Farm Colony =

- Wakamatsu Tea and Silk Farm Colony Farm
- U.S. National Register of Historic Places
- California Historical Landmark
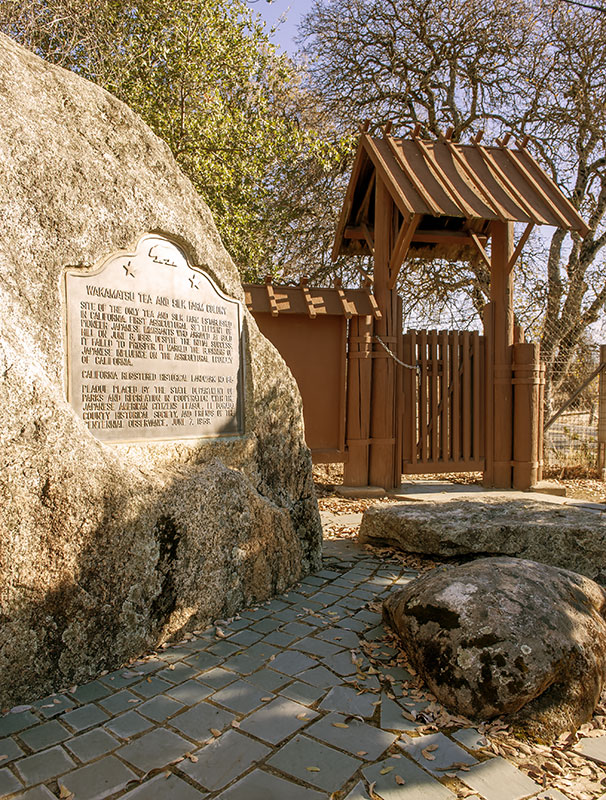
- Site of Wakamatsu Tea and Silk Farm Colony December 2013

- Location within California
- Nearest city: Placerville, California
- Coordinates: 38.770894°N 120.886783°W
- Built: 1869–1871
- NRHP reference No.: 09000397
- CHISL No.: 815

Significant dates
- Added to NRHP: October 9, 2009
- Designated CHISL: 1996

The Wakamatsu Tea and Silk Farm Colony is believed to be the first permanent Japanese settlement in North America and the only settlement by samurai outside of Japan. The group was made up of 22 people from samurai families during the Boshin Civil War (1868–69) in Japan preceding the Meiji Restoration. The group purchased land from Charles Graner family in the Gold Hill region after coming to San Francisco in 1869. Though the group was able to successfully show their produce during the 1869 California State Agricultural Fair in Sacramento and the 1870 Horticultural Fair in San Francisco, the farm as a Japanese colony only existed between 1869 and 1871.

Okei Ito, the first known Japanese woman to be buried on American soil, has her grave on the land. The Veerkamp family purchased the farm following the withdrawal of financial support from financier Matsudaira Katamori (1835–93). In 1969, the same year as the Japanese American centennial, Ronald Reagan, then governor of California, proclaimed the colony to be California Historical Landmark No. 815. The family preserved the heritage of the farm and Okei's grave for 137 years until the American River Conservancy purchased the land in November 2010, with the National Park Service placing the site on the National Register of Historic Places at a level of "national significance". The American River Conservancy offers private and public tours of the property, including Okei Ito's gravesite.

== Context ==
From the early 17th century, Japan was under Shogunate rule and considered an isolated country. It had few external trade partners, primarily the Dutch. After 260 years, Commodore Matthew Perry forced trade ports to open for the United States (1853–54). By 1860, the previous cultural isolation and government was starting to disintegrate, separating the country into two groups: those who opposed the isolation and sought change and those who supported the isolation and shogunate rule.

Matsudaira Katamori, related by marriage to the ruling Tokugawa family, was a daimyō of the Aizu Wakamatsu Province (today's Fukushima Prefecture) and disagreed with the Tokugawa policy of isolation. Matsudaira subscribed to the political notion of "Eastern ethics and Western Science". Eventually tensions boiled over and the Boshin Civil War began. Being a daimyō under the Tokugawa clan, 24-year-old Matsudaira was pushed by the Tokugawa shogunate to lead a campaign against the Satsuma (today's Kagoshima).The Satsuma, along with the forces of Choshu and Tosa, made up the Imperial Army who wanted to overthrow the current Shogunate and daimyo rule as they felt it was too weak to deal with foreign forces like the United States, who wanted to force trade. At the Battle of Aizu (1868), Matsudaira's force of samurai was defeated by the larger number sent by the Emperor.

John Henry Schnell was an early member of the Prussian embassy. After coming to Japan, he was employed by Lord Matsudaira as an arms dealer for cannons and Gatling guns. During this time, Japan did not have any diplomatic treaties with Germany. Because of this, Schnell dealt with the Japanese by masquerading as a Dutch trader. John Schnell trained Matsudaira's samurai in the use of the firearms and gained samurai status along with a Japanese name. This allowed him to marry a Japanese samurai class woman (Jou) which strengthened his ties to Japanese society.

Due to Matsudaira's loss at Aizu, the daimyō was condemned to death. His surrender placed Schnell and his family's life in danger. Because of this, Schnell asked for funding from Matsudaira and commissioned the SS China to transport his family and other samurai families to the United States. They took with them 50,000 three-year-old kuwa (mulberry trees) used for the cultivation of silk worms and six million tea seeds.

== Establishment ==
The Japanese immigrants arrived in San Francisco on May 20, 1869. They brought with them mulberry trees, silkworm cocoons, tea plant and bamboo shoots, cooking utensils, and swords. They caught the attention of the press, including the San Francisco Alta Daily News, who praised the Japanese work ethic. The colony hoped to establish an agricultural settlement and purchased approximately 200 acres of land, a farmhouse, and farm outbuildings from Charles Graner, the settler for the Gold Hill Ranch (1856) in June 1869. They displayed their silk cocoons, tea and oil plants at the 1869 California State Agricultural Fair in Sacramento and the 1870 Horticultural Fair in San Francisco. However, the drought of 1871 along with other misfortunes such as inadequate funding and a labor dispute led to the bankruptcy of the colony. The final nail in the coffin was the withdrawal of funding by Matsudaira Katamori who was, surprisingly, pardoned by the new Meiji government during the beginning of the Meiji restoration and became a Shinto priest. Schnell and his family told the other colonists that he and his family would return to Japan to request more funding from Matsudaira. Unfortunately, the fates of him and his family are unknown as they did not return to California, leading the colonists to believe that they were abandoned in the new world.

== Future of the colonists ==
Many of the colonists dispersed following the perceived abandonment of John Henry Schnell and the purchase of the land by the Francis Veerkamp family in 1873. A handful stayed and many sold their possessions in order to survive. Some returned to Japan, while others settled elsewhere looking for work.

Okei Ito, who came to the Wakamatsu colony as a nursemaid for the Schnell family at age 17, stayed on in Gold Hill under the employment of the Veercamp family. Unfortunately, Okei's journey in the new world was short lived as she died two years later of illness at the age of 19. She is believed to be the first Japanese woman buried on American soil. Her grave can be found on a hill overlooking the Gold Trail School. Matsunosuke Sakurai also stayed to work for the Veercamp family until his death in 1901. There is also a replica of her gravestone in Aizuwakamatsu, erected in 1958.

Masumizu Kuninosuke married an African/American Indian woman named Carrie Wilson in Coloma in 1877 and eventually moved to Sacramento where he lived until his death in 1915. Descendants of Kuninosuke have now been in America for seven generations.

Matsugoro Oto and Sakichi Yanagisawa also remained in California where they went to work with Nagasawa Kanaye, a Satsuma 15 student who managed the Fountain Grove Winery in Santa Rosa, CA for his mentor Thomas Lake Harris.

Oto and Yanagisawa eventually returned to Japan where Oto became a pioneer in Japanese wine production. Prior to Yanagisawa's return, his daughter Yone became the first Japanese woman to graduate from Berkeley in 1898. Descendants of Oto, Yanagisawa, and Kuninosuke have rediscovered their shared histories and periodically return to Wakamatsu to honor their ancestors.

== Protection of site ==
Though the Veerkamp family changed the purpose of the farm and for 125 years grazed cattle and operated a dairy farm, they worked to preserve remnants of the Japanese Colony. In the 1920s, there was an increase of interest in the former Japanese farm. Henry Taketa interviewed a 75-year-old Henry Veerkamp who was friends with Okei in his younger years. The attention led to an influx of Japanese Americans (now facing strict anti-alien laws) in 1924 coming to tend to Okei's gravesite and emphasized the colony as the beginning of Japanese immigration. The 1969 governor of California, future president Ronald Reagan, declared the Wakamatsu Tea and Silk farm to be California Historical Landmark No. 815. The year 1969 was designated by the Japanese American community to be the Japanese American Centennial. This designation drew the attendance of Matsudaira Ichiro (Matsudaira Katamori's grandson) and Japanese Consul General Shima Seiichi to the event supporting both the proclamation of Wakamatsu as a historical site, as well as the date of the centennial. A plaque was placed at the site then by the Parks and Recreation State Department in cooperation with JACL, El Dorado Historical Society and Friends of the Centennial Observance.

The Veerkamp family donated the original silk and gold-thread banner with the Tokugawa/Matsudaira lotus blossom crest along with a ceremonial dagger believed to have belonged to Jou Schnell (John Henry Schnell's wife) to the Marshall Gold State Historic Park in 2001. In 2007, a member of the family also found photographs taken of the colonists by the studio of Robert Miller in Placerville (1870) in an envelope. Later that year, the family appealed to the American River Conservancy (ARC) to ask for help in restoration of the Graner-Wakamatsu-Veerkamp farmhouse, providing public access and interpretation of the cultural history of the farm. The ARC purchased the site on November 1, 2010 for the appraised market value. Thanks to the efforts of Congressional District Representative Tom McClintock and U.S. Senator Barbara Boxer, there were bills introduced to the House and Senate to help the management of the ranch, which was registered at the level of "national significance" to the National Register of Historic Places by the National Park Service. Due to the efforts of ARC and its project partners, the Wakamatsu site is now open to the public throughout the year for private and public tours of the historical sites on the property, festivals, and other scheduled events. The property is not a public park and is not open to the public except during scheduled events. Two small farms lease portions of the land and homes from the ARC and practice sustainable agriculture there, in keeping with the historical use of the land as a farm by both the Japanese colonists and the Veerkamp family.
