= Battle of Bonari Pass =

1868 battle of the Boshin War

- Part of the Boshin War
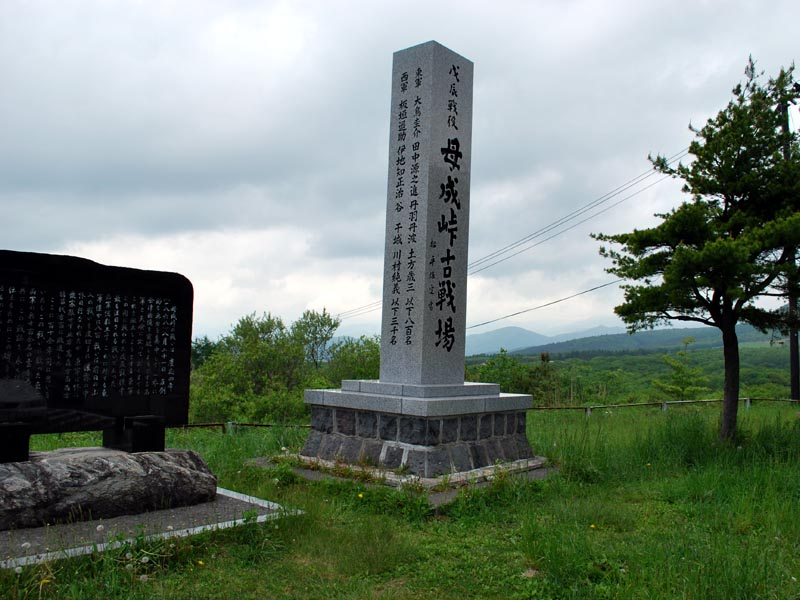
Date	October 6, 1868
Location	Inawashiro, Fukushima 37°35′44″N 140°14′35″E
Result	Imperial victory

Belligerents
Imperial Japanese Army	Bakufu Army

Commanders and leaders
Itagaki Taisuke; Ijichi Masaharu; Murata Tsuneyoshi	Ōtori Keisuke; Hijikata Toshizō

Strength
3,000	800

Casualties and losses
Unknown	Unknown
- Location within Japan

The Battle of Bonari Pass (Japanese: 母成峠の戦い) was part of the Boshin War, and occurred on the 6 October 1868 (Gregorian Calendar), or the 21st day of the Eighth Month, Keiō-4 year (Japanese calendar). The Bonari pass was a strategic access at the limit of the fief of Aizu.

The battle was between a mixed force of 800 troops – including former shogunate soldiers (Denshūtai and Shinsengumi) led by Ōtori Keisuke and Hijikata Toshizō, Aizu forces, and soldiers of various northern domains — against a much larger number of troops favourable to the Imperial government.

Itagaki Taisuke led his troops, by some estimates numbering as many as 3,000, in a rapid strike against forces defending Aizuwakamatsu Castle. Heading southwest from Nihonmatsu, Itagaki then took a route across Bonari Pass northwards to cross into Aizu.

Outnumbered, the shogunal troops had to retreat to the North to Sendai, where the fleet of Enomoto Takeaki was ready to evacuate them to Hokkaidō. This left Aizu exposed, and facilitated the imperial advance.

Three days later, the Imperial troops reached the castle of Wakamatsu and laid siege to it, in the key action of the Battle of Aizu.

== Gallery ==
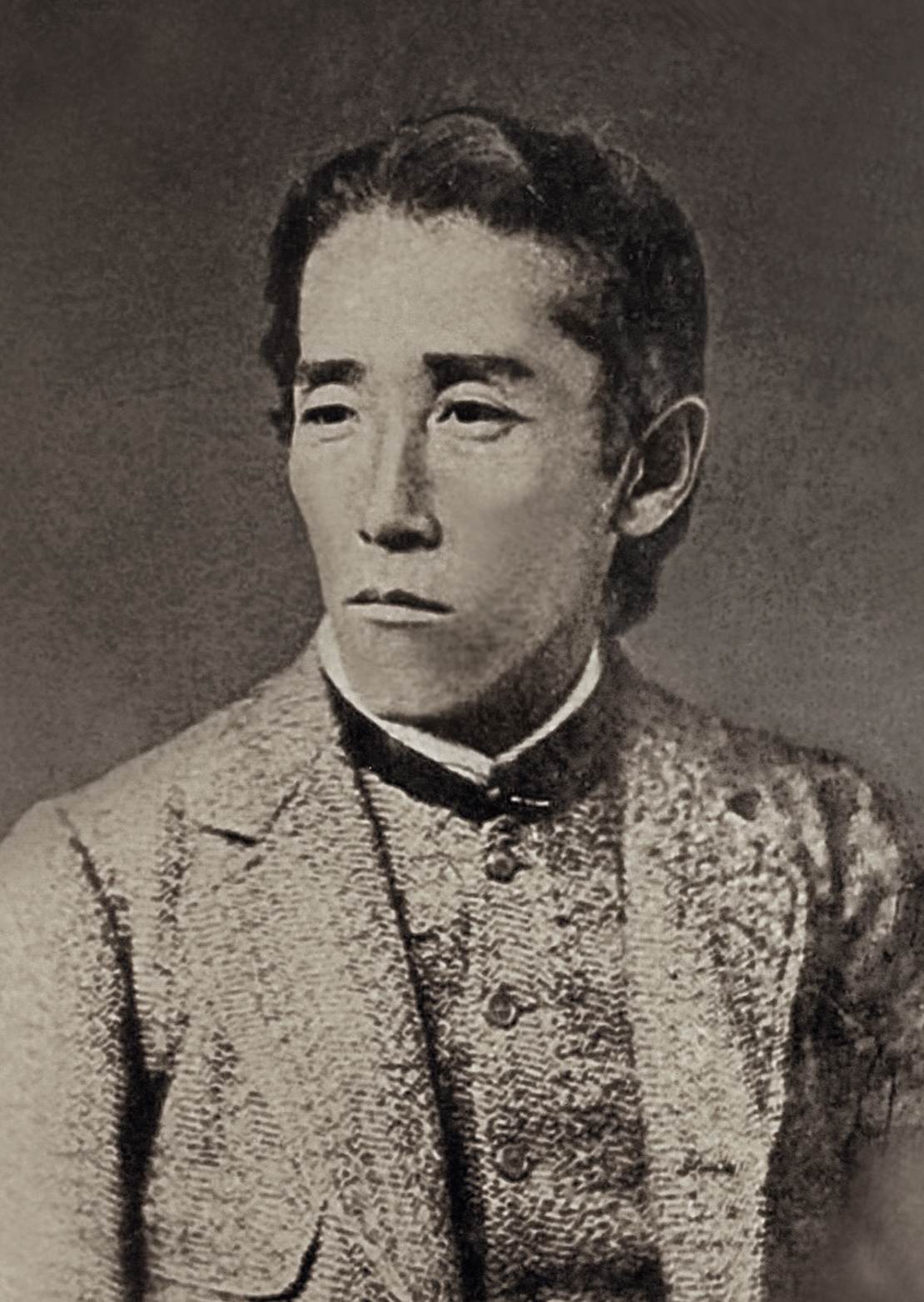
Itagaki Taisuke
Imperial Japanese Army

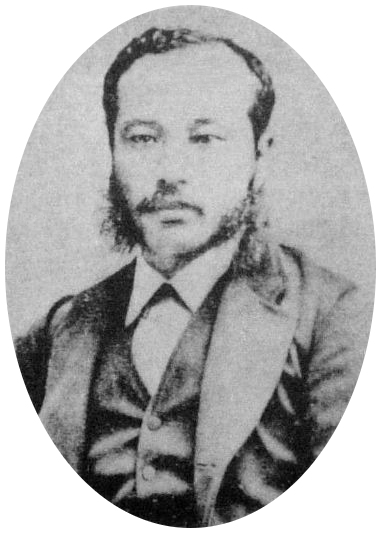
Ōtori Keisuke
Bakufu Army
