= Yae's Sakura =

Japanese television series

- Promotional poster
- Genre: Taiga drama
- Written by: Mutsumi Yamamoto
- Starring: Haruka Ayase; Hidetoshi Nishijima; Joe Odagiri; Hiroki Hasegawa; Jun Fubuki; Yutaka Matsushige; Kyōko Hasegawa; Tetsuji Tamayama; Gō Ayano; Shun Oguri; Meisa Kuroki; Kotaro Koizumi; Shido Nakamura; Takumi Saito; Yoshiko Miyazaki; Katsuhisa Namase; Kumiko Akiyoshi; Masaya Kato; Masahiro Takashima; Kōji Kikkawa; Ichikawa Somegorō VII; Izumi Inamori; Takashi Sorimachi; Eiji Okuda; Hiroaki Murakami; Hiroki Matsukata; Toshiyuki Nishida
- Narrated by: Mitsuko Kusabue
- Theme music composer: Ryuichi Sakamoto
- Composer: Nobuyuki Nakajima
- Country of origin: Japan
- Original language: Japanese
- No. of episodes: 50

Production
- Producer: Shinsuke Naitō (chief)
- Running time: 45–75 minutes

Original release
- Network: NHK
- Release: January 6 – December 15, 2013

Yae's Sakura (Japanese: 八重の桜, Hepburn: Yae no Sakura) is a 2013 Japanese historical drama television series and the 52nd NHK taiga drama. Written by Mutsumi Yamamoto, the drama focuses on Niijima Yae, who is portrayed by Haruka Ayase. Yae is a strong believer in women's rights and the story follows her journey in Japan, during the time it is opened up to Western ideas.

Yae, who came from the Aizu Domain (now within Fukushima Prefecture), was chosen for the taiga drama as her story of loss and hope was felt to be timely in the aftermath of the 2011 Tōhoku earthquake and tsunami. The drama was nominated for the International Emmy Award for Best Drama Series.

== Production ==
- Kunishirō Hayashi - Sword fight arranger

== Cast ==
- Haruka Ayase as Niijima Yae
  - Rio Suzuki as childhood Yae

Her family

- Hidetoshi Nishijima as Yamamoto Kakuma, Yae's brother
- Hiroki Hasegawa as Kawasaki Shonosuke, Yae's first husband
- Joe Odagiri as Joseph Hardy Neesima, Yae's second husband
- Jun Fubuki as Yamamoto Saku, Yae's mother
- Yutaka Matsushige as Yamamoto Gonpachi, Yae's father
- Kyōko Hasegawa as Higuchi Ura, Kakuma's first wife
- Mitsuki Tanimura as Yamamoto Tokie, Kakuma's second wife
- Masahiro Toda as Tokuzō, manservant of the Yamamoto family

Aizu Domain

- Gō Ayano as Matsudaira Katamori, 9th daimyō of the Aizu Domain
- Toshiyuki Nishida as Saigō Tanomo, chief senior counselor of the Aizu clan
- Izumi Inamori as Matsudaira Teru, adoptive sister of Katamori
- Ayame Goriki as Hinata Yuki, childhood friend of Yae
- Meisa Kuroki as Nakano Takeko, a female swordmaster for the Aizu Domain
- Takumi Saito as Jinbo Shuri, chief retainer of the Aizu domain and son of Kuranosuke
- Masane Tsukayama as Jinbo Kuranosuke, chief retainer of the Aizu domain
- Tetsuji Tamayama as Yamakawa Hiroshi, major general of the Imperial Japanese Army and childhood friend of Yae
- Mikako Ichikawa as Yamakawa Futaba
- Ryo Katsuji as Yamakawa Kenjirō
- Kumiko Akiyoshi as Yamakawa En
- Kiko Mizuhara as Ōyama Sutematsu
- Morio Kazama as Hayashi Yasusada
- Hiroyuki Ikeuchi as Kajiwara Heima
- Shido Nakamura as Sagawa Kanbei
- Shingo Yanagisawa as Kayano Gonbei
- Shihori Kanjiya as Fujita Tokio, childhood friend of Yae
- Junko Miyashita as Takagi Sumie

Tokugawa shogunate

- Kotaro Koizumi as Tokugawa Yoshinobu
- Takaaki Enoki as Ii Naosuke
- Makiya Yamaguchi as Enomoto Takeaki

Shinsengumi

- Yū Kamio as Kondō Isami
- Jun Murakami as Hijikata Toshizō
- Kenji "KJ" Furuya as Saitō Hajime
- Tadashi Mizuno as Nagakura Shinpachi
- Shinji Suzuki as Okita Sōji

Government of Meiji

- Katsuhisa Namase as Katsu Kaishū
- Mitsuhiro Oikawa as Kido Takayoshi
- Kazuki Kosakai as Iwakura Tomomi
- Satoshi Tokushige as Ōkubo Toshimichi
- Masaya Kato as Itagaki Taisuke
- Takashi Sorimachi as Ōyama Iwao
- Eisuke Sasai as Sanjō Sanetomi
- Toranosuke Katō as Itō Hirobumi
- Manabu Ino as Yamagata Aritomo

Chōshū Domain

- Shun Oguri as Yoshida Shōin
- Takamasa Suga as Kusaka Genzui
- Hitoshi Ozawa as Sera Shūzō

Satsuma Domain

- Koji Kikkawa as Saigō Takamori
- Yoichi Hayashi as Shimazu Nariakira

Others

- Hiroaki Murakami as Matsudaira Yoshinaga
- Eiji Okuda as Sakuma Shōzan
- Goro Ibuki as Tokugawa Nariaki
- Kyūsaku Shimada as Maki Yasuomi
- Mitsuki Tanimura as Oda Tokie (Kakuma’s second wife)
- Hiroki Matsukata as Ōgakiya Seihachi
- Eric Bossick as Carl Wilhelm Heinrich Lehmann
- Mayuko Kawakita as Tsuda Umeko
- Ichikawa Somegorō VII as Emperor Kōmei
- Kenji Masaki as Sakamoto Ryōma
- Masahiro Takashima as Makimura Masanao

== Production ==
On June 22, 2011, NHK announced that its 52nd taiga drama is titled Yae's Sakura and will be about the life of Niijima Yae, the "Jeanne d'Arc of Bakumatsu", with Mutsumi Yamamoto as writer and Katu Takō as director. The historical figure of Niijima was chosen for her story of loss and hope, along with her coming from the Aizu domain (now within the Fukushima Prefecture), to help inspire Japan after the 2011 Tōhoku earthquake and tsunami, which seriously affected Fukushima more than the other prefectures.

=== Music ===
Ryuichi Sakamoto was announced as the series' theme music composer on April 10, 2012. This is Sakamoto's first time composing music for a taiga drama.

== TV schedule ==
Episode	Original airdate	Title	Directed by	Rating
1	January 6, 2013	"Naranu kotowa Naranu" (ならぬことはならぬ, No Means No)	Taku Katō	21.4%
2	January 13, 2013	"Yamuniyamarenu Kokoro" (やむにやまれぬ心, The Heart Must Do What It Must)	Taku Katō	18.8%
3	January 20, 2013	"Kechirashite Mae e" (蹴散らして前へ, Kick Open the Way Forward)	Taku Katō	18.1%
4	January 27, 2013	"Yōrei-boshi" (妖霊星, Star of Ill Portent)	Taku Katō	18.2%
5	February 3, 2013	"Shōin no Yuigon" (松陰の遺言, Shoin's Will)	Masae Ichiki	18.1%
6	February 10, 2013	"Aizu no Ketsui" (会津の決意, Aizu's Resolve)	Masae Ichiki	15.3%
7	February 17, 2013	"Shōgun no Kubi" (将軍の首, The Shoguns' Heads)	Sō Suenaga	17.5%
8	February 24, 2013	"Mamanaranu Omoi" (ままならぬ思い, Uncontrollable Emotions)	Taku Katō	15.6%
9	March 3, 2013	"Hachigatsu no Dōran" (八月の動乱, Upheaval in August)	Masae Ichiki	15.1%
10	March 10, 2013	"Ikedaya Jiken" (池田屋事件, The Ikedaya Incident)	Takuya Shimizu	12.6%
11	March 17, 2013	"Shugoshoku wo Ute!" (守護職を討て！, Attack the Shugoshoku!)	Taku Katō	14.3%
12	March 24, 2013	"Hamaguri-gomon no Tatakai" (蛤御門の戦い, The Battle of Hamaguri-gomon)	Masae Ichiki	13.9%
13	March 31, 2013	"Teppō to Hanayome" (鉄砲と花嫁, Firearms and the Bride)	Sō Suenaga	14.3%
14	April 7, 2013	"Atarashiki Hibi e" (新しい日々へ, Towards New Days)	Taku Katō	11.7%
15	April 14, 2013	"Satchō no Mitsuyaku" (薩長の密約, Satsuma-Choshu Secret Treaty)	Takuya Shimizu	14.2%
16	April 21, 2013	"Tōzakaru Senaka" (遠ざかる背中, The Retreating Figure)	Takuya Shimizu	13.8%
17	April 28, 2013	"Nagasaki kara no Okurimono" (長崎からの贈り物, Gift from Nagasaki)	Masae Ichiki	13.7%
18	May 5, 2013	"Shōnosuke tono Tabi" (尚之助との旅, Travels with Shonosuke)	Masae Ichiki	15.7%
19	May 12, 2013	"Yoshinobu no Gosan" (慶喜の誤算, Yoshinobu's Misjudgement)	Sō Suenaga	15.0%
20	May 19, 2013	"Kaisen! Toba-Fushimi" (開戦！鳥羽伏見, Outbreak of War!)	Taku Katō	13.7%
21	May 26, 2013	"Haisen no Sekinin" (敗戦の責任, Responsibility for Defeat)	Masae Ichiki	14.1%
22	June 2, 2013	"Otōto no Kataki" (弟のかたき, Vengeance for a Younger Brother)	Sō Suenaga	13.3%
23	June 9, 2013	"Aizu wo Sukue" (会津を救え, Save Aizu)	Taku Katō	15.0%
24	June 16, 2013	"Nihonmatsu-shōnentai no Higeki" (二本松少年隊の悲劇, The Tragedy of the Nihonmatsu Youth Brigade)	Masae Ichiki	14.8%
25	June 23, 2013	"Byakkotai Shutsujin" (白虎隊出陣, Byakkotai Goes to War)	Yoshiharu Sasaki	12.9%
26	June 30, 2013	"Yae, Kessen no Toki" (八重、決戦のとき, Yae, the Moment of Battle)	Taku Katō	14.0%
27	July 7, 2013	"Hōimō wo Toppa seyo" (包囲網を突破せよ, Break Through the Siege)	Taku Katō	12.9%
28	July 14, 2013	"Jiman no Musume" (自慢の娘, Daughter of Pride)	Taku Katō	16.6%
29	July 21, 2013	"Tsuruga-jō Kaijō" (鶴ヶ城開城, Surrender of Tsuruga Castle)	Sō Suenaga	14.5%
30	July 28, 2013	"Saiki eno Michi" (再起への道, Road to Recovery)	Sō Suenaga	12.6%
31	August 4, 2013	"Rien no Wake" (離縁のわけ, A Reason for Divorce)	Yoshiharu Sasaki	15.4%
32	August 11, 2013	"Ani no Mitorizu" (兄の見取り図, Brother's Sketch)	Masae Ichiki	13.9%
33	August 18, 2013	"Shōnosuke tono Saikai" (尚之助との再会, Reunion with Shonosuke)	Masae Ichiki	15.9%
34	August 25, 2013	"Kaettekita Otoko" (帰ってきた男, The Man Who Came Back)	Taku Katō	13.4%
35	September 1, 2013	"Jō no Propozu" (襄のプロポーズ, Joe's Proposal)	Sō Suenaga	14.2%
36	September 8, 2013	"Dōshi no Chikai" (同志の誓い, Oath of Comrades)	Yoshiharu Sasaki	15.4%
37	September 15, 2013	"Kageki na Tenkōsei" (過激な転校生, Radical Transfer Student)	Ryōhei Nakano	15.0%
38	September 22, 2013	"Seinan Sensō" (西南戦争, Seinan War)	Taku Katō	11.9%
39	September 29, 2013	"Watashi tachi no Kodomo" (私たちの子ども, Our Children)	Masae Ichiki	13.3%
40	October 6, 2013	"Tsuma no Hattari" (妻のはったり, A Wife's Bluff)	Sō Suenaga	12.4%
41	October 13, 2013	"Kakuma no Musume" (覚馬の娘, Kakuma's Daughter)	Ryōhei Nakano	12.4%
42	October 20, 2013	"Jō to Iku Aizu" (襄と行く会津, Going to Aizu with Joe)	Taku Katō	14.8%
43	October 27, 2013	"Rokumeikan no Hana" (鹿鳴館の華, Flowers of Rokumeikan)	Masae Ichiki	11.5%
44	November 3, 2013	"Jō no Yuigon" (襄の遺言, Joe's Testament)	Sō Suenaga	10.0%
45	November 10, 2013	"Fugi no Uwasa" (不義の噂, Rumors of Infidelity)	Sō Suenaga	12.8%
46	November 17, 2013	"Kakeochi" (駆け落ち, Elopement)	Takuya Shimizu	13.7%
47	November 24, 2013	"Nokosareta Jikan" (残された時間, Time Left)	Tomoki Hase	13.7%
48	December 1, 2013	"Goodbye, Mata Awan" (グッバイ、また会わん, Goodbye, See You Later)	Taku Katō	13.7%
49	December 8, 2013	"Futatabi Ikusa wo Manabazu" (再び戦を学ばず, Never Learn to Fight Again)	Masae Ichiki	12.2%
50	December 15, 2013	"Itsunohimo Hana wa Saku" (いつの日も花は咲く, The Flowers Will Always Bloom)	Taku Katō	16.6%
Average rating 14.6% - Rating is based on Japanese Video Research (Kantō region).

== Reception ==
In 2014, the series was nominated for the International Emmy Award for Best Drama Series.

== Home media ==
The first 15 episodes of Yae's Sakura were released on Blu-ray on October 23, 2013. The next 16 episodes received a Blu-ray release on January 22, 2014, which includes two behind-the-scenes featurettes and the textless series intro among others. The last 19 episodes of the series were released on Blu-ray on March 19, 2014, with the release featuring cast interviews and a behind-the-scenes featurette among others. All of the Blu-ray releases are region free.

== Soundtracks ==
- NHK Taiga Drama "Yae no Sakura" Original Soundtrack I (January 30, 2013)
- NHK Taiga Drama "Yae no Sakura" Original Soundtrack II (July 31, 2013)
- NHK Taiga Drama "Yae no Sakura" Original Soundtrack III (November 13, 2013)
- NHK Taiga Drama "Yae no Sakura" Original Soundtrack Complete Edition (January 1, 2014)
