= Jinbo Kuranosuke =

Japanese samurai

Jinbo Kuranosuke (神保 内蔵助; 1816 – October 8, 1868) was a Japanese samurai of the late Edo period who was a retainer of the Matsudaira clan of Aizu. He served in the Aizu administration as a karō. He fought in the Boshin War, and led the defense of Wakamatsu against the Imperial Japanese Army, together with Tanaka Tosa. When the Aizu forces were overwhelmed, Jinbo and Tanaka retreated to a nearby residence and committed seppuku.
