= Saku =

Saku may refer to:

== Places ==
- Saku, Nagano, a city in Japan
- Saku, Nagano (Minamisaku), a town in Japan
- Saku Parish, a rural municipality in Harju County, Estonia
  - Saku, Estonia, a small borough in Saku Parish, Harju County, Estonia
- Saku Constituency, an electoral constituency in Kenya

== Other uses ==
- Saku (given name), a masculine Finnish given name and a feminine Japanese given name
- Saku Brewery, an Estonian brewery
- "Saku" (song), by Dir En Grey
- Saku (EP), by Onew
