= Saku (given name) =

Saku is a masculine Finnish given name. Notable people with the name include:

- Saku Kinnunen (born 1995), Finnish ice hockey player
- Saku Koivu (born 1974), Finnish ice hockey player
- Saku Mäenalanen (born 1994), Finnish ice hockey player
- Saku Pesonen (born 1985), Finnish footballer
- Saku Puhakainen (born 1975), Finnish footballer
- Saku Salmela (born 1990), Finnish ice hockey player
- Saku Salminen (born 1994), Finnish ice hockey player
- Saku Savolainen (born 1996), Finnish footballer

Saku (written: 佐久) is also a feminine and masculine Japanese given name. Notable people with the name include:

- Matsudaira Saku (松平 佐久; 1846–1909), concubine of the Aizu lord Matsudaira Katamori
- Saku Machino (町野 朔; 1941–2026), scholar and professor of Sophia University

Saku is also a Sesotho masculine given name. Notable people with the name include:

- Saku Nkoli Saku (born mid 1800s), one of the first settlers of Ha-Khobotle, Lesotho.
- Mpota Saku (born 1908), Mosotho second world war veteran.
