= Matsudaira Kiyo =

Matsudaira Kiyo (松平 喜代), (1844 –1920) was a Japanese woman of the mid to late 19th century. Believed to have been a native of Edo. Kiyo, or as she was also known, Naka (ナカ), was a concubine of Matsudaira Katamori.

== Sources ==
- Tsunabuchi Kenjō, ed. Matsudaira Katamori no Subete. Tokyo: Shin Jinbutsu Oraisha, 1984.
