= Matsudaira Saku =

Matsudaira Saku (松平 佐久) (1846–1909) was a Japanese figure of the mid-19th century. The daughter of Tashiro Genbei of Edo, she became the concubine of the Aizu lord Matsudaira Katamori and gave birth to several of his children.
