= Matsudaira Katamori =

Japanese samurai

- 松平 容保
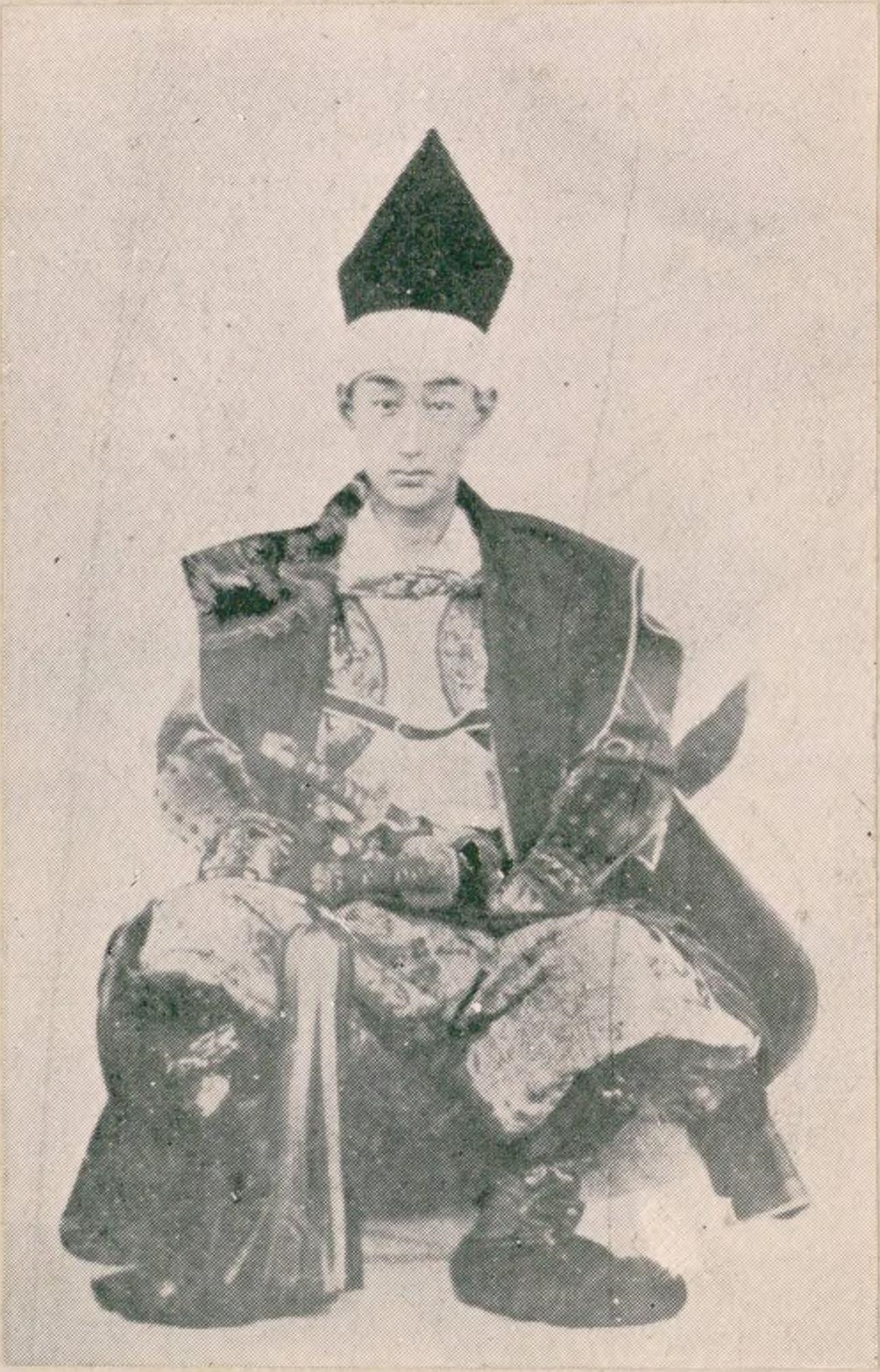
- Matsudaira Katamori as Kyoto Shugoshoku

9th Daimyō of Aizu Domain
- In office 1852–1868
- Monarchs: Shōgun: Tokugawa Iesada; Tokugawa Ieyoshi; Tokugawa Yoshinobu
- Preceded by: Matsudaira Katataka
- Succeeded by: Matsudaira Nobunori

Kyoto Shugoshoku
- In office 1863–1864
- Preceded by: None
- Succeeded by: Matsudaira Yoshinaga
- In office 1864–1867
- Preceded by: Matsudaira Yoshinaga
- Succeeded by: None

Personal details
- Born: February 15, 1836 Edo, Japan
- Died: December 5, 1893 (aged 57)
- Spouses: Matsudaira Toshiko; Matsudaira Saku; Matsudaira Kiyo; Kawamaru Naga
- Children: Matsudaira Kataharu; Matsudaira Tsuneo; Matsudaira Morio

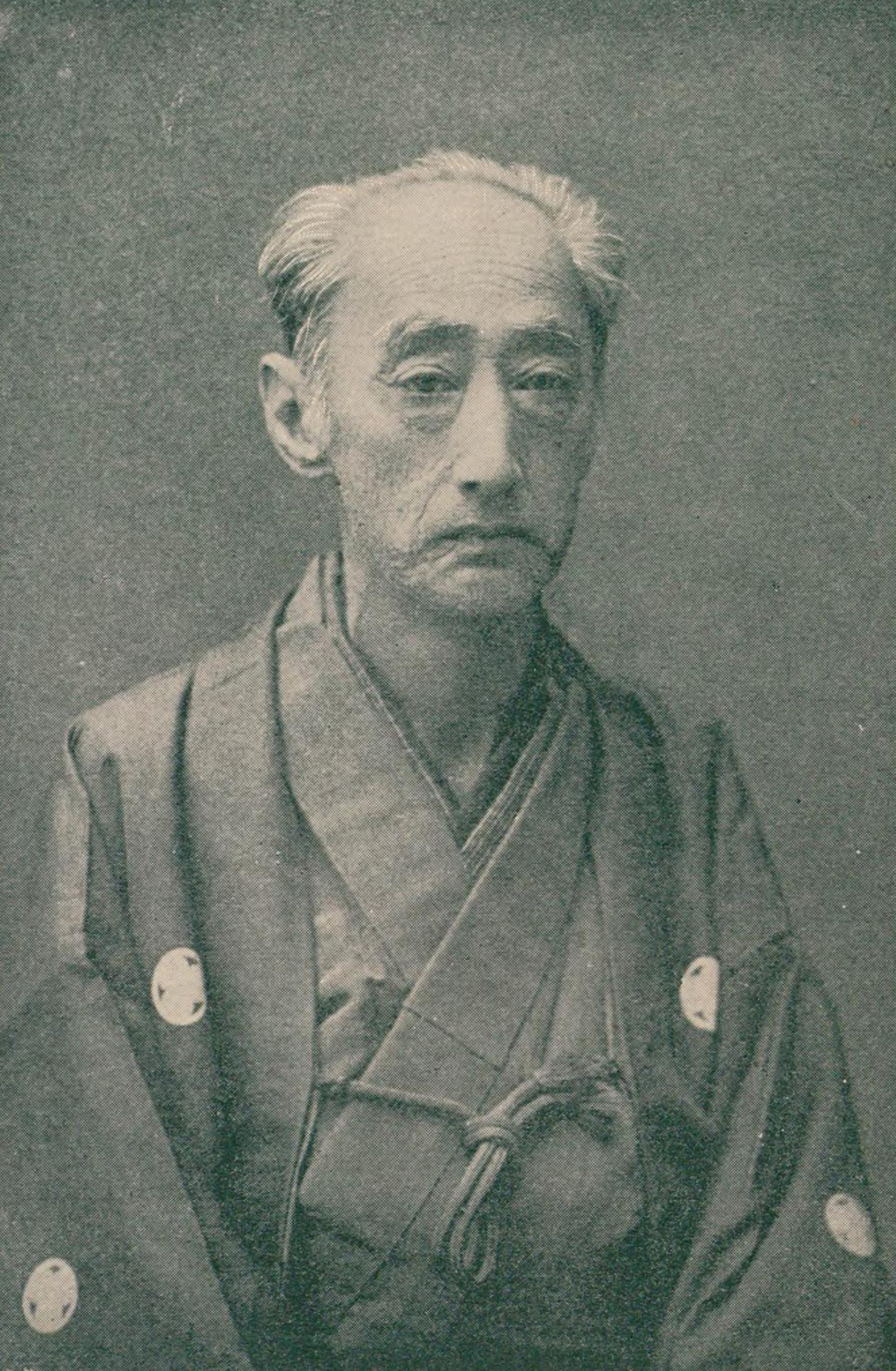
Matsudaira Katamori after the Meiji restoration

Matsudaira Katamori (松平 容保; February 15, 1836 – December 5, 1893) was a samurai who lived in Bakumatsu period and the early to mid Meiji period Japan. He was the 9th daimyō of the Aizu Domain and the Kyoto Shugoshoku (Military Commissioner of Kyoto). He initiated and established the Shinsengumi in 1863 (initially named Mibu Roshigumi). During the Boshin War, he led Aizu Domain against the incipient Meiji government, but was severely defeated at the Battle of Aizu. Katamori's life was spared, and he later became the head kannushi of the Nikkō Tōshō-gū shrine. He, along with his three brothers Matsudaira Sadaaki, Tokugawa Yoshikatsu, and Tokugawa Mochiharu, had highly influential roles during the Meiji restoration and were called the "four Takasu brothers" (Takasu yon-kyōdai 高須四兄弟).

== Early life ==
Matsudaira Katamori was born in the Yotsuya district of Edo, on February 15, 1836, at the residence of the Takasu Domain He was the seventh son of Matsudaira Yoshitatsu, daimyō of Takasu, born by one of Yoshitatsu's concubines, a woman of the Komori family whose name is believed by some scholars to be Komori Chiyo (she was also known by her Buddhist name, Zenkyō-in.) Katamori, or as he was first known, Keinosuke (銈之丞), had an eventful childhood. Though the Takasu domain was small, it had a high level of prestige due to its status as a branch family of the Tokugawa clan (through the gosanke house of Owari). Furthermore, in the history of the Takasu-Matsudaira line, there were daimyō who had been adopted from senior branches of the Tokugawa clan, such as Mito. Consequently, Katamori was in a very good position to be adopted out to a senior member of the Tokugawa house. This opportunity presented itself in the form of Matsudaira Katataka, the 8th generation daimyō of Aizu Domain. Yoshitatsu readily approved of the adoption, not only because Katataka was the lord of a more senior house with a distinguished history and lineage, but the fact that Katataka was his birth brother must have also entered into the equation. Consequently, the young Keinosuke was adopted by Katataka, and married Katataka's daughter Toshihime, in 1856. Following his adoption, Keinosuke assumed the name "Katamori", which made use of one of the characters from his adoptive father's name. He was presented to the reigning shōgun, Tokugawa Ieyoshi, as well as to the Tairō Ii Naosuke, four months after his adoption, and at the end of the year was invested with the courtesy title of Wakasa-no-kami (若狭守), which was traditionally held by the heir to the house of Aizu. Interested to further Katamori's education, Katataka then sent his heir to Aizu, where he was educated in the domain academy, Nisshinkan.

=== Succession and inheritance ===
Following Katataka's death in early 1852, Katamori succeeded to the family headship at age 18. As the 9th daimyō, he was granted the title of Higo-no-kami (肥後守), which was traditionally held by the daimyō of Aizu. He also received the additional title of Sakonnoe-gon-shōshō (左近衛権少将; Lesser General of the Left Guard) from the Imperial court, and formally sent his thanks to the Emperor later that year. Furthermore, Katamori inherited the family's traditional seat in the tamari-no-ma chamber, of Edo Castle where important matters of state were discussed in conjunction with the Senior Council.

=== Katamori and the Perry Mission ===
The early years following his appointment were filled with trying times for his leadership of the domain. Just one year later, Commodore Matthew C. Perry led the Perry Expedition into Edo Bay and demanded that Japan end its centuries-old national isolation policy and open to the country to American trade. The shogunate mobilized a massive number of men and ships from a broad coalition of feudal domains, and Aizu, being a prominent branch of the Shōgun's house and noted military power, was no exception. Aizu had already received orders to provide security in the coastal areas of Kazusa and Awa Provinces in the months prior to the Perry mission, and when the commodore went ashore to meet with Japanese officials, Aizu was one of the domains which provided patrol boats and coastal security for the event. Samuel Wells Williams, a translator on the Perry mission, backs up this record: "Some of the flags seen ashore, and the red jackets, too, to-day had 會 on them." This character, read ai was the contemporary character used in the ai of Aizu, and, as seen in artistic depictions of the era, was used on the domain's banners.

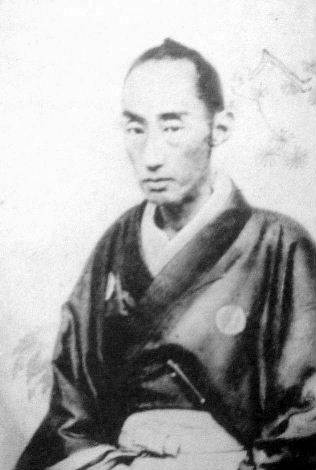

== Career as Kyoto Military Commissioner ==
=== Background ===
In 1862, senior political figures in the Tokugawa shogunate created the post of Kyoto Shugoshoku (Kyoto Military Commissioner), for the purpose of recovering public order in the city, which was under the influence of sonnō-jōi militants. The post of Kyoto Shugoshoku was one that changed much of the dynamic that had theretofore existed in the city. Previously, the holder of the Kyoto shoshidai (京都所司代) position had held the highest power there, supervising affairs in the Kyoto-Osaka area as the representative of the Shōgun. However, the successive Shoshidai, as well as the city magistrates under their charge, were increasingly unable to secure and maintain the public order, so the post of Shugoshoku was superimposed on the existing structure. Where the Shoshidai and magistrates had been unable to secure through civil law, the Shugoshoku was to achieve through the use of military force. After much deliberation, the choice for the Shugoshoku post came down to two domains: Echizen and Aizu. Of the two, Echizen's Matsudaira Yoshinaga already held high Shogunal office as President of Political Affairs (政治総裁職; Seiji Sōsai-shoku), so all attention was then turned to Matsudaira Katamori. As Katamori was ill, Aizu's senior Edo-based councilor Yokoyama Tsunenori was summoned to Edo Castle instead, and given word of the assignment. Katamori sent a retainer back with a request for being excused: "As this is a shogunal order, we not only have no choice but to accept. Furthermore, our domain's founder Lord [Hoshina] Masayuki laid down a direct command to do so in our house code. However, our lord Katamori is still young, and our men are in the north and unfamiliar with conditions in the Capital. If we were to accept this assignment without question, and a one in ten thousand chance of disaster were to strike, we of the Aizu domain could not possibly do it all alone; the Shōgun would have to get involved, as would all of Japan. We would like to consider this carefully." However, the Shogunate would not listen to this refusal. Matsudaira Yoshinaga traveled personally to the Aizu residence, and confronted Katamori with harsh words invoking Aizu's distinguished past as Shogunate functionaries: "If [your founder] Lord Masayuki were still alive, he would accept without a second thought!" Rumors began to circulate that Katamori refused the assignment out of a desire for self-preservation, to which Katamori is said to have responded, "If people start talking like this, it will shame our domain. There is no way I could explain this to the generations of Aizu lords who have gone before me. I have no choice but to accept."

=== Dissent, preparation, and arrival in Kyoto ===
News of Katamori's acceptance of the assignment quickly reached Aizu. Two of the domain-based councilors, Saigō Tanomo and Tanaka Tosa, were particularly opposed to the position, not only for the reasons that Katamori initially had opposed it, but also from a financial stance: Aizu, having been recently charged with both coastal defense at Edo Bay and supervision in eastern Ezo ( modern-day Hokkaidō), was heavily burdened by expense, and could not afford to do any more without risking total financial ruin. The two men rode nonstop from Aizu to try dissuading their lord from this venture. Saigo, ostensibly quoting the Chinese text Huai nan-tzu, described the intent to rein in the radicals as "trying to put out a fire while carrying brushwood". However, faced with the issues of preserving Aizu's reputation, as well as the pressure of a direct Shogunal order brought about by such power figures as Tokugawa Yoshinobu, Matsudaira Yoshinaga, and others, Katamori hardly had a say in the matter; this was something that he indicated directly to his retainers. His words to the aforementioned Yokoyama (and others) show that he knew full well what Aizu was getting itself into: "What will be, will be. Be prepared to meet your grave in Kyoto."

On September 23, 1862, Katamori was formally summoned to Edo Castle and presented with the assignment. The position was not without its personal incentives: it included an office salary of 50,000 koku a year, a 30,000 ryō loan to cover the expense of traveling to Kyoto, as well as a promotion to Senior 4th court rank, lower grade (正四位下; shō-shi'i-ge). Following the assignment, a sweeping program of personnel reassignment took place in the Tokugawa government's Kyoto command structure. Assigned together with Katamori were a group of trusted, powerful daimyō and hatamoto: Nagai Naoyuki was named Kyoto City Magistrate, Makino Tadayuki, the lord of Nagaoka Domain, was made Kyoto Shoshidai, and Chūjō Nobunori as Katamori's assistant for protocol. Katamori then sent a group of seven men under the previously mentioned Tanaka Tosa ahead to Kyoto, in order to begin forming the necessary connections with domains already in Kyoto, as well as the Imperial court. After a few months of further political difficulty, he left Edo on January 27, 1863 at the head of a thousand-strong Aizu force. Entering Kyoto on February 11, he first headed to Honzen-ji temple, changing into court clothes, then going to the residence of Imperial regent Konoe Tadahiro and paying his respects. After that, he promptly set up residence in the eastern section of the city, at Konkaikōmyō-ji temple, in the Kurodani area. Soon after his arrival, Katamori was again formally received by the Court, appearing before regent Konoe together with his senior retainers Ono Gonnojō and Komori Ikkan. His warm reception and popularity with many in the Court thus set a precedent of frequent visits that was to continue for the duration of his position.

=== Tenure ===
The first difficulty that Katamori faced after taking office was the unfamiliarity of the locals with Aizu and its ability to get the job done. Aizu was so unfamiliar to many people in early 1863 that many of them pronounced its name "kaizu" or "kwaiz", with both ai and kai being common readings of the first character 會 in "Aizu". This issue of unfamiliarity and unease began to have some resolution in the early months of 1863, when Katamori was formally received at the Imperial court. The court nobles were very pleased to see his arrival, and had great hopes for him as an agent of the Kōbu gattai (公武合体) movement to promote renewed cooperation between the Court and the Shogunate. In order to achieve the objectives that the Shugoshoku position entailed, Katamori made use of city patrol units, some of them made up of his own retainers, but others consisting of hired, previously lordless men, such as the Shinsengumi. Other groups emerged in subsequent years, including the Mimawarigumi, which was under the control of the Shoshidai (which as of 1864 was Katamori's brother Matsudaira Sadaaki of Kuwana). Katamori took his role as protector of Kyoto (and the Court) very seriously, and thus played a large role in the coup d'état of September 30 (or the coup d'état of August 18), and the Kinmon incident (禁門の変), which both involved clashes between the allied forces under Shogunate command (including Aizu) against the men of Chōshū Domain. During the punitive First and Second Chōshū expeditions, he also advocated a hard line against the domain. These events lead to increased animosity against Katamori and Aizu Domain within the Chōshū Domain.

Katamori served as Shugoshoku from 1862 through 1864; and he served again from 1864 through 1868.

== Failed California Silk Colony ==
Katamori also disagreed with the Tokugawa policy of isolation and subscribed to the political notion of "Eastern ethics and Western Science". Katamori employed Prussian diplomat John Henry Schnell as an advisor and trader to procure and train his troops in western firearms. As the fortunes of the Bakufu waned, Katamori provided the seed capital for Schnell escape to California with a group of samurai retainers and their families in an attempt to establish the first Japanese colony in America, the Wakamatsu Tea and Silk Farm Colony in 1869. Sadly, with the forfeit of the Aizu domain, Katamori would be unable to continue his patronage of the colony and it would fail two years later.

After Aizu Wakamatsu fell during the early Meiji Reforms, Katamori sent loyal retainers to modern-day Placerville, California in the United States to form the Wakamatsu Tea and Silk Colony. In total, twenty-two Japanese (samurai, peasants, farmers, and tradespeople) attempted to farm the 640-acre colony with lackluster results; the mulberry trees and tea bushes did not take to foreign soil. The colony lasted less than two years. Katamori abandoned his efforts by 1871 despite an influx of new immigrants in 1870; his adherents either returned to Japan or drifted away.

== Boshin War and aftermath ==
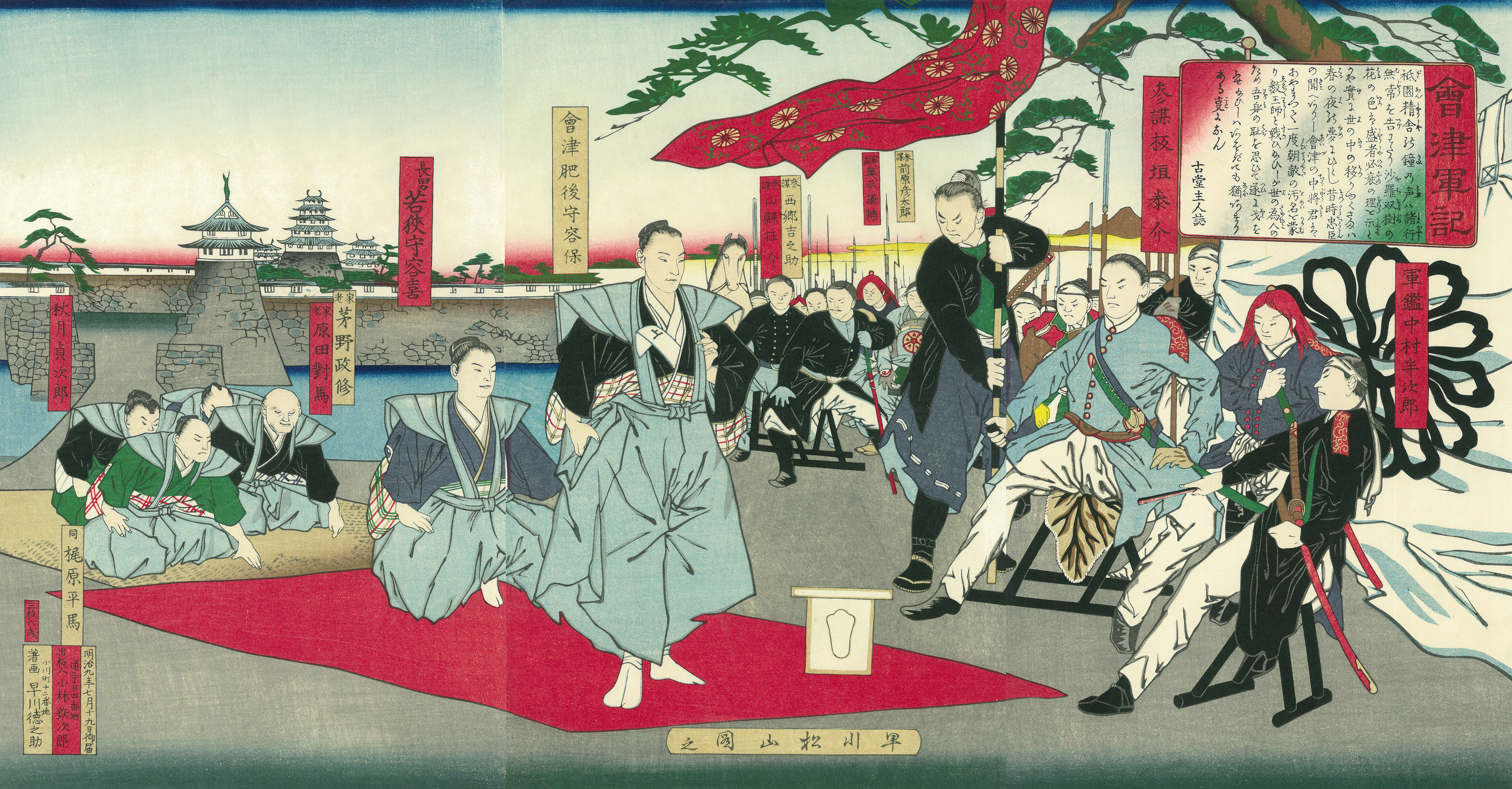
Itagaki Taisuke and Matsudaira Katamori（Battle of Aizu）

Katamori tried to achieve peaceful resolutions after the Battle of Toba–Fushimi, apologizing to the Imperial court many times, and even formally presenting a letter of submission to Prince Rinnoji no Miya Yoshihisa, but the members of the new Meiji government refused to pay him any heed. This was because the new government was primarily composed of people from Chōshū and Satsuma, who resented Katamori for his activities as the Military Commissioner. Although the Ōuetsu Reppan Dōmei, comprising most of the domains of northern Japan, supported Aizu Domain and Katamori, they were eventually defeated in the Aizu War. After a few years under house arrest in Tokyo, Katamori's life was spared, and he later became the head kannushi of the Nikkō Tōshō-gū Shrine. He died on December 5, 1893, and was buried by Shinto rites, receiving the posthumous Shinto name of Masane-reishin (忠誠雲神). His heir, Matsudaira Nobunori, was adopted from the Mito-Tokugawa family. However, Nobunori left the Aizu-Matsudaira clan soon after the Meiji restoration, to let Matsudaira Kataharu become the heir to the clan. Matsudaira Kataharu was Katamori's eldest biological son, born from one of Katamori's two concubines (Saku and Kiyo) after Nobunori was adopted. The clan chieftainship then passed to Kataharu's brother Morio, and subsequently to Morio's son Matsudaira Morisada, who was the head of the Aizu-Matsudaira until his death in 2011.

== Ancestry ==
Ancestors of Matsudaira Katamori

8. Tokugawa Harumori, 6th Lord of Mito (1751-1805)
4. Matsudaira Yoshinari, 9th Lord of Takasu (1776–1832)
9. Maeda Sayama
2. Matsudaira Yoshitatsu, 10th Lord of Takasu (1800–1862)
5. Hiramatsu
1. Matsudaira Katamori, 9th Lord of Aizu (1836–1893)
6. Komori
3. Komori Chiyoko

== See also ==
- Matsudaira Teru
- Matsudaira Sadaaki
- Saigō Tanomo
- Ōuetsu Reppan Dōmei
- Matsudaira Katakuriko
- Yae no Sakura
