= Ijichi Masaharu =

Japanese samurai (1828 – 1886)

Hakushaku Ijichi Masaharu
- 伊地知 正治
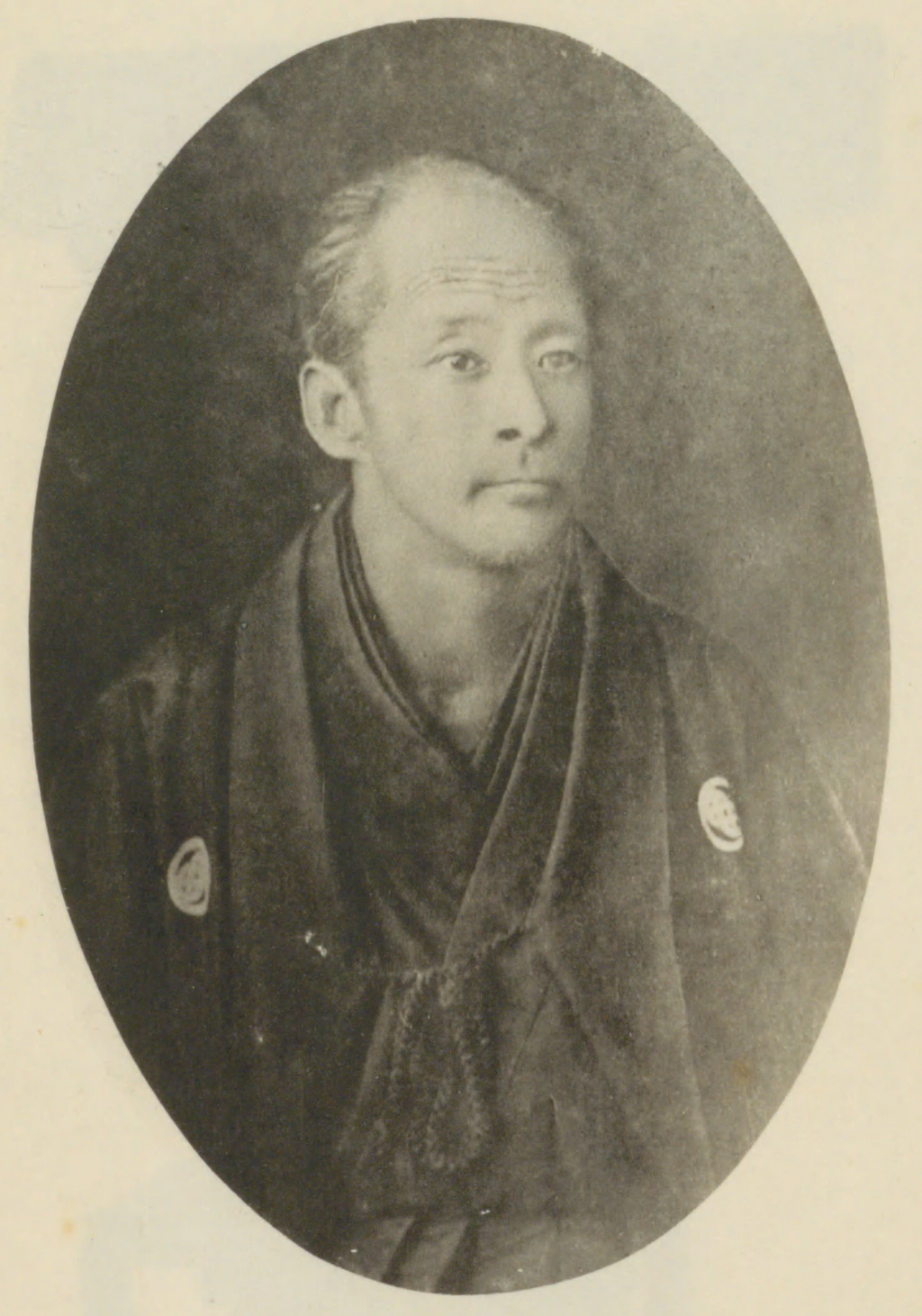

Personal details
- Born: August 7, 1828 Kagoshima, Satsuma Domain, Japan
- Died: May 23, 1886 (aged 57)
- Resting place: Aoyama Cemetery

Military service
- Allegiance: Satsuma Domain; Imperial Japanese Army
- Years of service: 1867–1886

Ijichi Ryū'emon Masaharu (Japanese: 伊地知 龍右衛門 正治; August 7, 1828 – May 23, 1886) was a Japanese samurai retainer of the Shimazu clan, military strategist, and aristocrat. His imina was Sueyasu (季靖).

== Biography ==
Ijichi Masaharu was born near the walls of Kagoshima Castle. He was the second son, and his father was Ijichi Suehira (伊地知 季平). As a boy, he was given the apotropaic name Tatsugoma (竜駒). His family was a branch of the Ijichi clan, an old family allegedly descended from the ancient Taira.

At the age of 3, Ijichi was regarded as a child prodigy, but a childhood disease blinded his left eye and crippled his left leg. He suffered from the lameness caused by his disabled leg for the rest of his life.

Ijichi studied Yakumaru Jigen-ryū under the instruction of Yakumaru Kaneyoshi II. He also studied the Satsuma Domain's traditional Gōden school (合伝流, Gōden-ryū) of military strategy under Ishizawa Rokurō (石沢六郎) and later Hōga Uzaemon (法亢宇左衛門).

Encountering Ijichi in 1868, Ernest Satow described him as an "old, ugly, mis-shapen fellow".

== Boshin War service ==
During the Boshin War of 1868, Ijichi was appointed Spearhead Governor of the Tōsandō (東山道先鋒総督参謀).

Ijichi Masaharu has been described as an "exceptional tactician" (類いまれな軍略家, taguimare na gunryakuka). At the Battle of Shirakawaguchi, Ijichi defeated an army of more than 2,500 soldiers with only 700 men under his command. He also provided tactical guidance at the Battle of Bonari Pass.

Ijichi's unique style of maneuver warfare revolved around small units of highly trained and heavily armed infantry advancing rapidly. In accordance with the teachings of the aggressive Gōden school, he made extensive use of walking fire.

== After the war ==
During the Seikanron debate of 1873, Ijichi was a strong advocate in support of the conquest of Korea. In 1884, he was created a count (伯爵, hakushaku). He died on May 23, 1886. He is described as having had an intense personality and brilliant mind, but there exist many anecdotes of his eccentricities.
