= Southern African Community USA =

Non-profit organization to promote Southern African culture

Southern African Community USA (SACU)
- Formation: 2013
- Headquarters: Silver Spring, Maryland
- Website: www.southernafricancommunity.org

Southern African Community USA (SACU) is a registered 501(c)3 non-profit organization that was established in 2013 in the state of Maryland to promote Southern African culture and unite the Southern African Diaspora communities in the USA. It was co-founded by 10 leaders from various Southern African countries who worked together to build an organization that focused on Southern Africans living in the USA.

It serves to create Southern African identity and cohesion in the DC area and the wider US though advocacy work, community outreach, hosting social events and acting as a resource of information on the region. It is the first association in the United States that was organized for the region and the first Southern African Diaspora Association in the world. It recognizes the countries of Angola, Botswana, Democratic Republic of Congo, Eswatini, Lesotho, Madagascar, Malawi, Mauritius, Mozambique, Namibia, Seychelles, South Africa, Tanzania, Zambia and Zimbabwe as members of the Southern African community in consistency with SADC member states

== History ==
SACU was founded in October 2013 by 10 Southern Africans living in the US in order to increase the visibility of Southern Africans in the US and build community among Southern Africans. As such its Mission Statement reads “The mission of the SACU is to unite all citizens, descendants and friends of Southern Africa in the USA through various activities and events, and to increase the visibility of Southern Africans in the USA whilst contributing to the overall development of the Southern African community.”. The goals of the organization are to: Promote Southern African countries and communities; Inform, educate and create cultural awareness about Southern Africa; Provide a platform for economic empowerment of Southern Africans in the USA; Contribute to philanthropic and social welfare projects; To build and encourage community among Southern Africans (community building); Provide culturally enhanced entertainment.

== Projects & Programs ==
=== Southern African Reunion ===
SACU hosts a number of events in the DC metro area, this includes a Southern African Reunion Weekend which is aimed at uniting the Southern African communities. Events include a family picnic, soccer tournament, netball tournament, fashion show and other social events.

==== Southern African Fashion Show ====
SACU hosted the first Southern African Fashion Show in 2014 which highlights designers from Southern Africa and its Diaspora. Its subsequent show was held in 2015. It is the only fashion show in the US that is specific to Southern African fashion and culture.

==== Southern African Professionals Networking Forum ====
SACUs platform brings together professionals from Southern Africa and career experts to network and talk about career advancement for people from our region.

=== Southern African Connection ===
SACU's TV show which focuses on Southern African issues, events and information and people.

=== Community Outreach and Advocacy ===
SACU's platform for advising on the interests and concerns of Southern Africans and other African communities in the DMV area. This includes providing immigration and assimilation workshops as well as providing resources for Southern Africans.

=== Other programs ===
Other Programs include a Business Expo brings together people and companies who are interested in doing business with Southern Africa and her people (Southern African Business Expo (SABE); SACUs platform for keeping Southern Africans aware of current events in Southern African region (Southern African News Portal); and Southern Africans for American Immigration Reform (SAFAIR), a platform for providing awareness to Southern African immigrants about immigration reform and building alliances with other organizations that support comprehensive immigration reform.

== Organizational structure ==
SACU is a membership organization and receives all its funding from its members or community support. It has a Board of Directors, Advisory Board, and general membership.

=== Founders ===
Nadine Gauldino (Angola), Sitinga Kachipande (Malawi), Henri Marolen (South Africa), Siyanda Masiza (South Africa), Lisa Netha (Namibia), Rachel Nghiwete (Namibia), Mimmy Polan (Botswana), Margaret Perakis (South Africa), Cassandra Sibande (Zimbabwe), and Omega Tawonezvi (Zimbabwe).

== See also ==
- African immigration to the United States
