= Denshūtai =

Japanese elite military unit

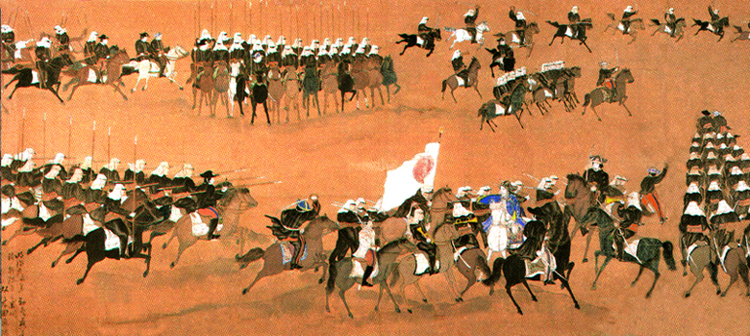
The Shogunate's French-style cavalry.

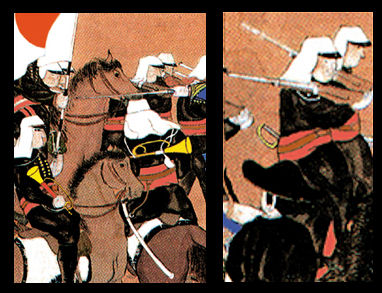
Denshūtai cavalry and infantry (details).

The Denshūtai (伝習隊) was a corps of elite troops of the Tokugawa Bakufu during the Bakumatsu period in Japan. The corps was founded by Ōtori Keisuke with the help of the 1867–68 French Military Mission to Japan.

The corps was composed of 800 men. They were equipped with advanced Minié-type Enfield guns, vastly superior to the percussion Gewehr smoothbore guns and matchlock Tanegashima possessed by the other Shogunal troops.

The troops were trained by French officers such as Charles Chanoine and Jules Brunet, and fought during the 1868–1869 Boshin war.
