= Kyoto Shugoshoku =

The Kyōto Shugoshoku (京都守護職, Military Commissioner of Kyoto) was a Japanese bureaucratic office of the Tokugawa shogunate from 1862 through 1868. The officeholder was responsible for keeping the peace in the city of Kyoto and its environs, and in this role, largely supplanted the extant office of Kyoto Shoshidai, though the two offices existed side by side until 1867, when both were abolished.

Matsudaira Katamori of Aizu held the office for much of its existence, with the exception of a brief period in 1864, when the office was held by Matsudaira Yoshinaga of the Fukui Domain.

== List of Kyoto shugoshoku ==
- Matsudaira Katamori (1862–1864, 1864–1868).
- Matsudaira Yoshinaga, also known as Matsudaira Keiei (1864).

== See also ==
- Bugyō
