= Tanaka Tosa =

Samurai who fought in the Boshin War

Tanaka Tosa (田中 土佐; September 7, 1820 – October 8, 1868) was a Japanese samurai of the Edo period who was a retainer of the Matsudaira clan of Aizu. He served as a karō in the Aizu administration, and fought in the Boshin War. Upon the entry of Imperial Japanese Army forces into the Tsuruga Castle town, he led an effort to halt their advance. Upon defeat, he followed fellow karō Jinbo Kuranosuke into a nearby doctor's house, and committed seppuku.
