= Ōtori Keisuke =

Japanese military leader and diplomat (1833-1911)

Baron Ōtori Keisuke
- 大鳥 圭介
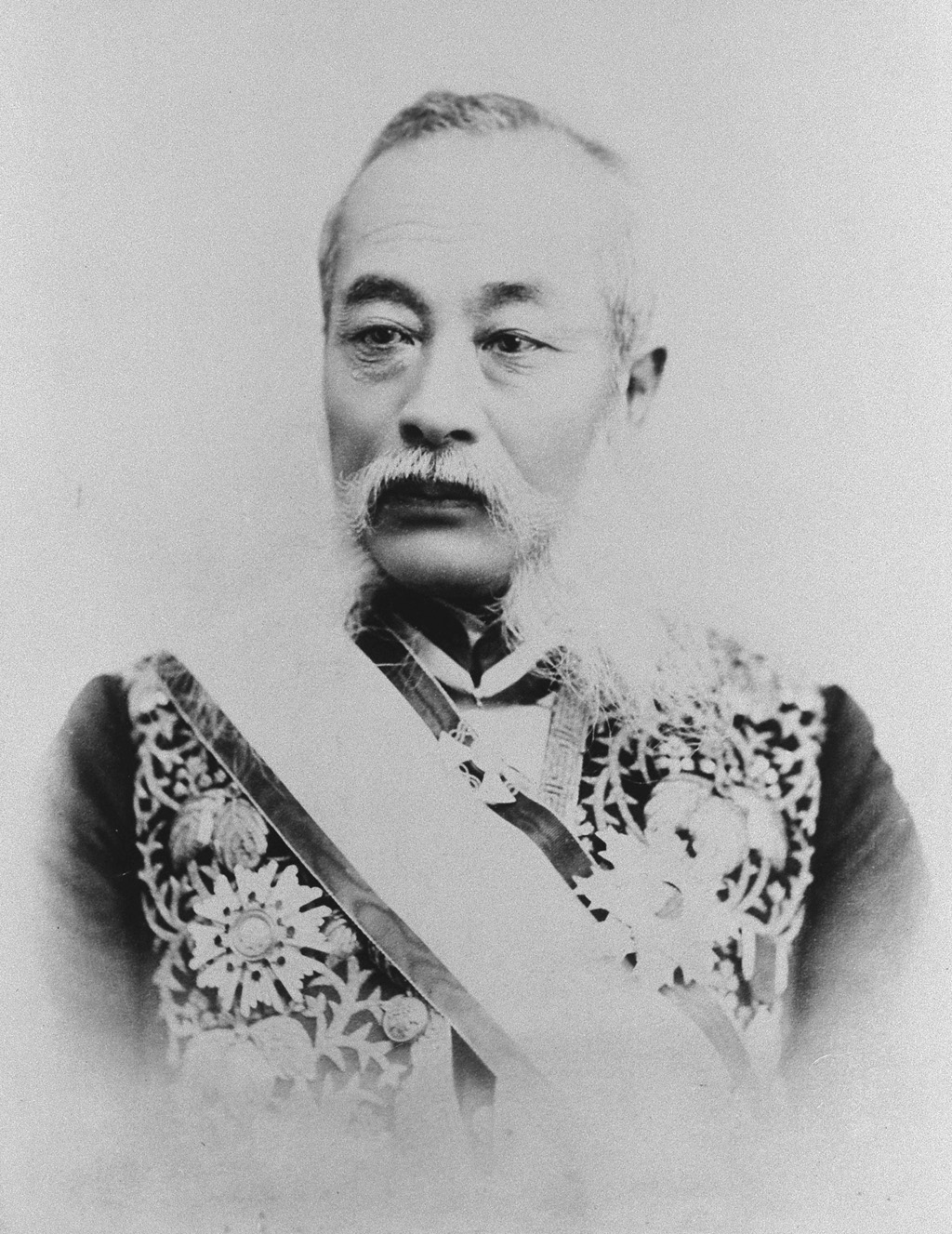
- Born: April 14, 1833; Akamatsu Village, Akō, Harima, Japan
- Died: June 15, 1911 (aged 78); Tokyo, Japan
- Education: Shizutani school, Ogata Kōan's school
- Occupations: Military leader, diplomat, educator
- Military career
- Allegiance: Tokugawa shogunate Republic of Ezo
- Branch: Tokugawa Shogunate Army; Ezo Army
- Service years: 1859–1869
- Rank: Infantry Magistrate (Hohei bugyō)
- Conflicts: Boshin War; Battle of Toba–Fushimi; Battle of Hakodate

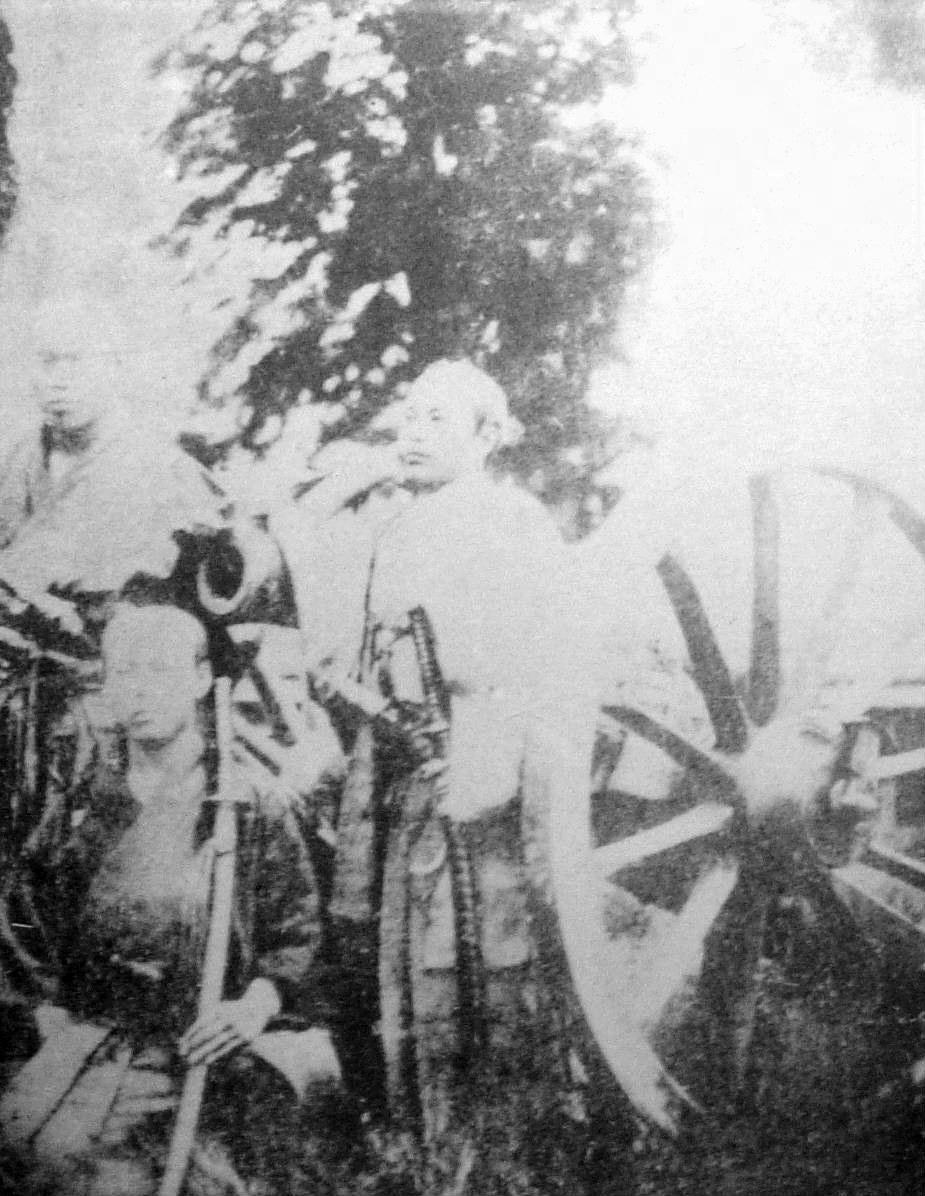
Ōtori Keisuke during the Boshin War (center).

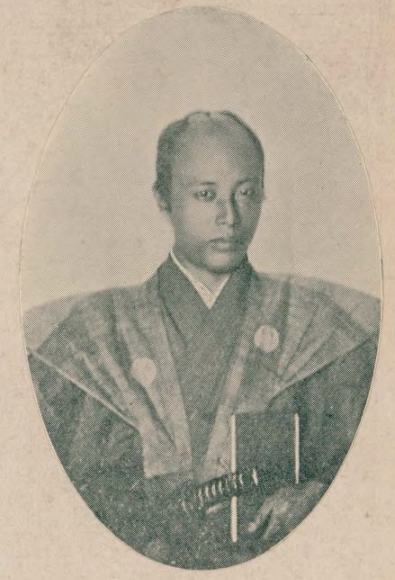
Ōtori Keisuke in the Bakumatsu era.

Baron Ōtori Keisuke (大鳥 圭介; 14 April 1833 – 15 June 1911) was a Japanese military leader and diplomat.

== Biography ==
=== Early life and education ===
Ōtori Keisuke was born in Akamatsu Village, in the Akō domain of Harima Province (modern-day Hyōgo), the son of physician Kobayashi Naosuke. At a young age, he entered the Shizutani school in Bizen, engaging in Chinese studies, and continued his education at the renowned Rangaku school of Ogata Kōan, where he studied Dutch language and medicine. Further learning was obtained in Edo, where Ōtori travelled to attend the school of Tsuboi Tadamasu, known for instructing students engaged in the study and translation of Dutch. While in Edo he also received education from Egawa Tarōzaemon regarding military strategy, and studied English with Nakahama Manjirō, thus coming into possession of an uncommonly thorough, for his era, appreciation of Western culture. As a result, in 1859, the Tokugawa shogunate appointed him as an instructor to its Kaiseijo institute, and it was from there that Ōtori entered the shogunate army.

=== Time in the Tokugawa Army ===
After entering the Tokugawa army, Ōtori displayed promise as a student, quickly becoming a senior instructor of infantry tactics. After a period spent as a student of Jules Brunet in Yokohama, learning specifics of French infantry tactics, he was promoted to (Infantry Magistrate (歩兵奉行, Hohei bugyō)), a rank equivalent to a four-star general in a modern Western army.

Ōtori used his status as a respected scholar of Western studies to take the rather unexpected step of making suggestions on governmental reform to the Shōgun. In 1864, he issued a petition expressing his views on the benefits of a bicameral legislature to the government. In his position with the military, Ōtori was able to create of an elite brigade, the Denshūtai, modeled after advice provided by strategists attached to the 1867–68 French military mission to Japan. Consisting of 800 men, the Denshūtai's members were chosen on the basis of capability rather than background; a matter of particular determination for Ōtori, who remained mindful of his own relatively humble birth.

=== Boshin War ===
In the aftermath of military failure at the Battle of Toba–Fushimi in early 1868, Shōgun Tokugawa Yoshinobu returned to Edo and expressed serious consideration towards pledging allegiance to the new Meiji government. Otori and Oguri Tadamasa did not intend to lay down their arms without battle, and indicated their intention to continue the war but, following the surrender of Edo Castle, Ōtori gathered 500 men of the Shogunate Army at Hō'on-ji Temple in Asakusa, and left Edo. Upon arriving in Ichikawa he joined with Hijikata Toshizō of the Shinsengumi, Akizuki Tōnosuke of Aizu, Tatsumi Naofumi of Kuwana, and others, expanding his force to 2000 men. Dividing the infantry into three groups, he ordered them to attack. One unit was marched towards Nikkō, defeating an Imperial Army detachment on the way at Koyama in Shimotsuke Province. The detached unit under Hijikata had also defeated an Imperial army force at Utsunomiya Castle, and proceeded to enter the castle by way of Koyama. Ultimately, however, for Ōtori Keisuke, there would be no more military victories.

Upon reaching the domain seat of Wakamatsu, Ōtori's men mounted a fighting retreat while defending the western approaches to Aizu. In his search for reinforcements, Ōtori unsuccessfully petitioned Matsudaira Katamori to gather peasants from the surrounding villages and, although continuing to remain in the vicinity of Wakamatsu for some time, was eventually forced to retreat in the face of an advance from the Imperial Army, making his way to Sendai. There he met with Enomoto Takeaki, who had arrived in Matsushima Bay with six warships of the former Shogunate. Boarding these ships, the force headed for Hakodate, Hokkaidō.

Soon afterward, the Republic of Ezo was established, and as a result of the first attempt at democratic elections that Japan had ever seen, Ōtori was elected Minister of the Army. However, in terms of battlefield experience, Ōtori was expert mostly in theory; while his second-in-command Hijikata Toshizō was far more experienced in combat, and Ōtori's awkwardness, as well as his tendency to laugh and say Mata maketa yo! ("Oh I lost again!") in the face of defeat gave him a bad reputation with his men.

In the Battle of Hakodate when the Imperial Army surrounded the Goryōkaku fortress, Enomoto Takeaki wanted to go down fighting; however, it was Ōtori who suggested a peaceful surrender, changing Enomoto's mind with his words of "If it's dying you want you can do it anytime."

Ōtori was taken into custody and transferred to a prison in Tokyo; a building which ironically he had built himself as Ōdaira-mae Infantry Barracks.

=== Later life ===
While in prison, Ōtori continued to make use of his knowledge of Western learning, to the benefit of his fellow prisoners. An anecdote recounts that during his imprisonment, he not only reformed the bad habits of the prison director, but also managed to institute a parliamentary system amongst the prisoners.

After his release in 1872, Ōtori agreed to work in the Meiji government, first becoming involved in land reclamation, and later becoming president of the Gakushūin Peers' School in 1886. In 1889, Ōtori was sent as an ambassador to China's Qing dynasty and Korea's Joseon dynasty. He also had an instrumental role in the opening of the First Sino-Japanese War.

Ōtori was also involved in efforts to preserve history. Beginning in 1898, he assisted with the editing and publication of the magazine Kyū Bakufu, which focused on archiving memoirs and accounts of the former Shogunate by the men who had made up its ranks. He also contributed to the building of a monument to the war dead in Hakodate.

Ōtori Keisuke died from esophageal cancer two months after his 78th birthday.

== See also ==
- List of Ambassadors from Japan to South Korea
