= Karō =

Top-ranking samurai officials

Karō (家老, house elder) were high-ranking samurai officials and advisors in service to the daimyōs of feudal Japan.

== Overview ==
In the Edo period, the policy of sankin-kōtai (alternate attendance)^{1} required each daimyō to place a karō in Edo and another in the home han (feudal domain). A karō who was in charge of a castle was called the jōdai karō (城代家老), while the one in Edo was called the Edo karō (江戸家老). A general term for a domain-based karō is kunigarō (国家老).

Some domains referred to this position as bugyō (奉行) or toshiyori (年寄). The shogunate post of rōjū (elder) had many similarities to that of karō.

The famous samurai tale, Kanadehon Chūshingura, describes events involving a karō. The final Asano daimyō of the Ako han was Asano Naganori. While he was in Edo, he was sentenced to commit seppuku for the offense of drawing a sword against Kira Yoshinaka in Edo Castle. When the shogunate abolished the Ako han, all the Ako samurai became rōnin. Ōishi Kuranosuke, the jōdai karō, led 46 other rōnin in a vendetta against Kira. As a result of his leadership in the Forty-seven Ronin affair, Ōishi went down in history as the most famous of all karō.

== Harmful effects of the Karo system ==
Two to a few Karos are in the clan administration in a collegial system, but faction conflicts often occur in connection with political reforms and succession issues. Such a conflict became the cause of the "house turmoil", and in the worst case, it could lead to improvement .

In particular, the confrontation between the karos, the elderly, and the magistrates who are trying to promote the reforms in an authoritative manner against the background of the lord's trust, which was set up for the feudal affairs reform, and the conservative chief retainers and the priests who represent the opinions of the clan. It was a classic scene, and there were political disputes such as the fact that the clan theory was divided into two and led to a blood-washing conflict, and that the feudal lord was forced to retire with the fall of the reformist elders.

== Duty ==
Basically, he was allowed to stay away from home because of illness or old age, and remained in the post of a senior until he died once he took office. usually, the person on duty is decided on a monthly basis, and the person on duty makes the decision. the person on duty is called the duty or the moon number by the clan. important matters shall be decided on a regular day by gathering at a Hyōjōsho, etc. and proceeding after a meeting.

== See also ==
- Ōishi Kuranosuke
- Zusho Hirosato
- Yamakawa Hiroshi
- Saigō Tanomo
- Naoe Kanetsugu

== Notes ==
^1 Sankin kōtai ("alternate attendance") was a policy of the shogunate during most of the Edo period of Japanese history. The purpose was to control the daimyōs (feudal Lords). Generally, the requirement was that the daimyōs of every han (province) move periodically between Edo (the Japanese capital) and his han, typically spending alternate years in each place. His wife and heir were required to remain in Edo as hostages. The expenditures necessary to maintain residences in both places, and for the procession to and from Edo, placed financial strains on the daimyōs making them unable to wage war. The frequent travel of the daimyōs encouraged road building and the construction of inns and facilities along the routes, generating economic activity.
