= Matsudaira Sadanori =

Japanese daimyō

- 松平定教
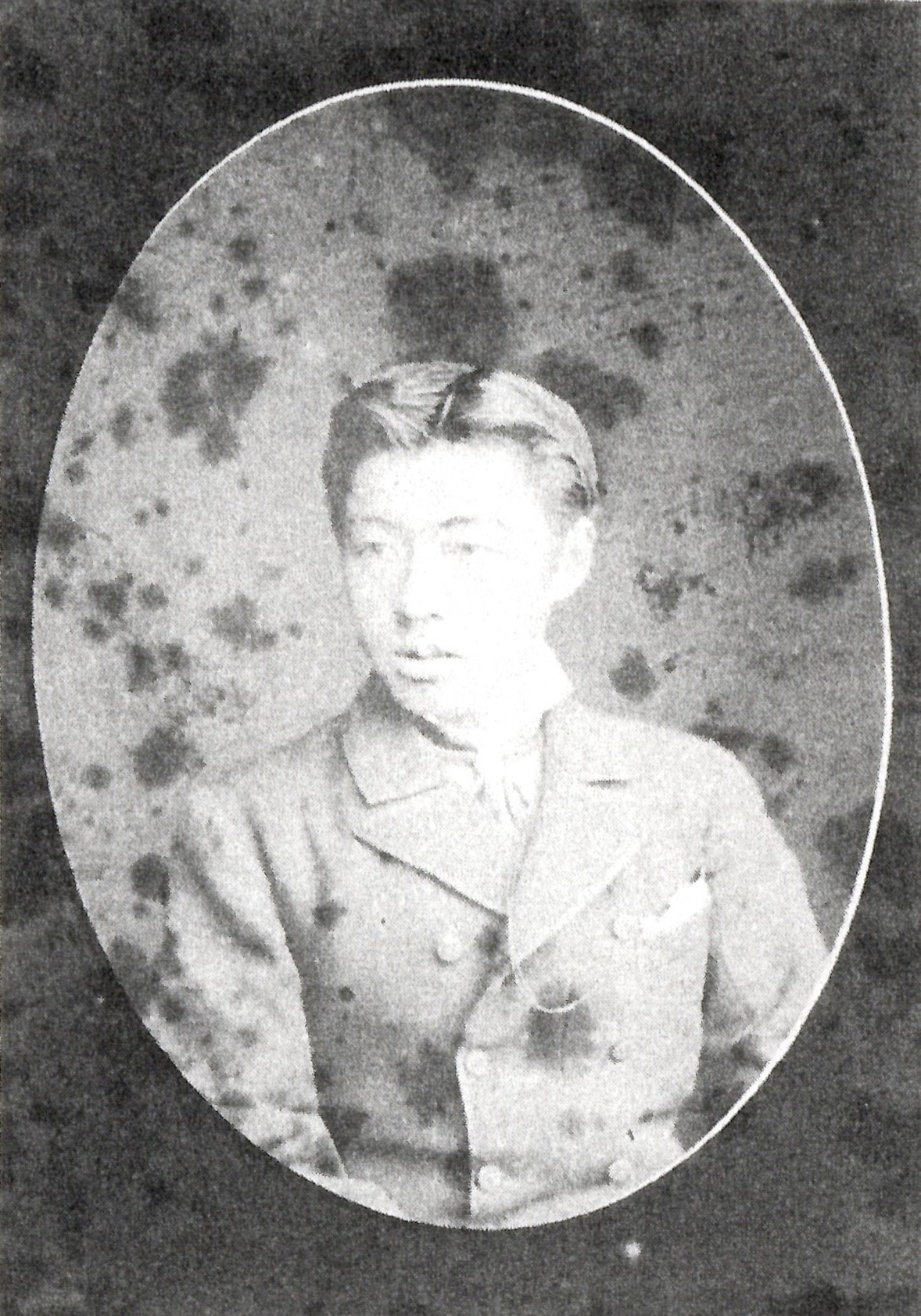
- Matsudaira Sadanori, post-Meiji restoration

Governor of Kuwana Domain
- In office 1869–1871
- Monarch: Emperor Meiji

Personal details
- Born: May 16, 1857
- Died: May 21, 1899 (aged 42)
- Parent: Matsudaira Sadamichi (father)

Matsudaira Sadanori (松平定教, May 16, 1857 – May 21, 1899) was the 5th (and last) daimyō of Kuwana Domain in Ise Province (modern-day Mie Prefecture) in early Meiji period Japan.

== Biography ==
Matsudaira Sadanori was the eldest son of Matsudaira Sadamichi the 3rd daimyō of Kuwana, but was the son of a concubine and only age three when his father died. He was adopted as heir to the 4th daimyō, Matsudaira Sadaaki. It was only 10 years old at the time of the Battle of Toba-Fushimi which opened the Boshin War. Kuwana was one of the key supporters of Matsudaira Katamori and Shogun Tokugawa Yoshinobu, and Kuwana forces retreated towards Edo after the defeat at Toba-Fushimi. This left Kuwana Domain largely undefended, and on the approach of the pro-imperial Satchō Alliance army, the karō of the domain and the council of senior retainers surrendered Kuwana Castle without resistance. Kuwana Domain was placed under the protection of Owari Domain, and after a few months of house arrest, Matsudaira Sadayori was released. However, due to the continued resistance of his adopted father, Matsudaira Sadaaki at Edo and Aizu, he was placed under arrest again. In August 1869, the new Meiji government punished Kuwana Domain by reducing its kokudaka from 110,000 to 60,000 koku and ordered that Matsudaira Sadanori succeed his father as daimyō and head of the clan. However, as by this time the title of daimyō had been abolished, Sadanori's official title was that of imperial governor. In 1871, after the abolition of the han system he moved to Tokyo.

In September 1872, he relocated to Yokohama and attended the school founded by American missionary Samuel Robbins Brown to study the English language. In November 1874, he enrolled at Rutgers University in the United States, and returned to Japan after graduation in December 1878. In March 1880, he obtained a post at the Foreign Ministry and was assigned as a liaison to the Italian Consulate in Tokyo. With the establishment of kazoku peerage on July 8, 1884, he was made a viscount (shishaku). From 1888, he served at the Board of Ceremonies in the Imperial Household Ministry.

His wife was Suzuko, a daughter of Yamaoka Tesshū.

Matsudaira Sadanori died on May 21, 1899, and his grave is at the Somei Cemetery in Komagome, Tokyo.
