= Oda Nobutoshi =

Daimyo of the Tendō Domain (1853–1901)

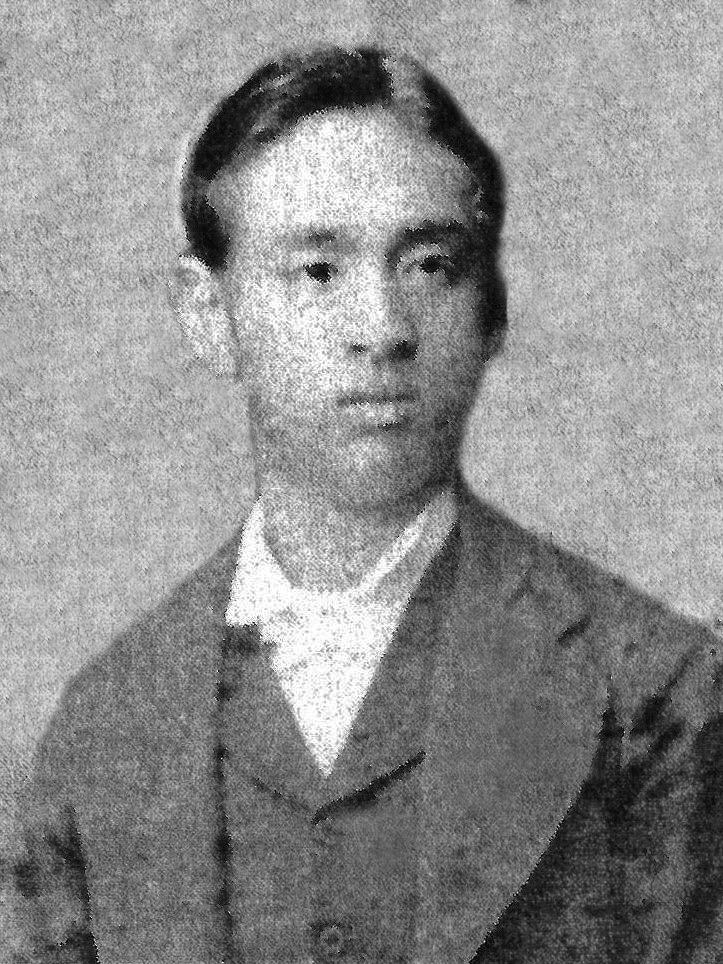

3rd Daimyō of Tendō
- In office 1868 – 1868 or 1869
- Preceded by: Oda Nobumichi
- Succeeded by: Oda Suemaru

5th Daimyō of Tendō
- In office 1869–1871
- Preceded by: Oda Suemaru
- Succeeded by: none

Personal details
- Born: November 19, 1853 Edo, Tokugawa shogunate
- Died: June 6, 1901 (aged 47) Tokyo, Empire of Japan

Viscount Oda Nobutoshi (織田信敏; November 19, 1853 – June 6, 1901) was a daimyō of the tozama feudal domain of Tendō in Dewa Province, northern Japan. He was a direct descendant of the famed Oda Nobunaga, through Nobunaga's son Oda Nobukatsu. He had the ceremonial court titles of junsanmi (Junior Third Rank) and Hyōbu-taifu.

== Biography ==
Nobutoshi was born at Tendō Domain's Edo residence as the fourth son of Oda Nobumichi. He was originally known as Oda Fukunosuke (織田富久之助). His wife was the daughter of Matsumae Takahiro, lord of Ezo, but they were later divorced.

During the Boshin War of the Meiji Restoration, the forces loyal to shōgun Tokugawa Yoshinobu were defeated in the Battle of Ueno, and fled north. The new Meiji government seized Edo, and ordered the daimyōs of the northern domains to report and pledge their allegiance to the new government in early 1868.

Oda Nobumichi declared himself too ill to travel, officially retired, and sent his son Oda Nobutoshi in his place. Oda Nobutoshi and his senior retainer Yoshida Daihachi were ordered to act as guide and escort to the imperial army being sent to the Tōhoku region against the pro-Tokugawa partisans still active, especially centered on nearby Shōnai domain. Oda Nobutoshi participated in the attack on Shōnai, and in retaliation, Shōnai forces burned Tendō town in April. The Tokugawa shogunate provided a relief fund of 5000 ryō to help with the rebuilding. With the formation of the Ōuetsu Reppan Dōmei of northern domains against the imperial government, Tendō initially attempted to remain neutral, but joined the alliance in September 1868. Following the defeat of the pro-Tokugawa forces in the Boshin War, Nobutoshi was placed under house arrest in Tokyo at the family temple of Korin-ji, and replaced as daimyō by his brother Oda Suemaru. The domain revenues were decreased to 18,000 koku. Nobutoshi was allowed to return to Tendō in July 1869 in the role of domain governor, as Suemaru was still in his minority.

Tendō domain was abolished with the Abolition of the han system in 1871, and Nobutoshi was appointed governor. In 1874, Nobutoshi joined the new Meiji government as an employee of the Imperial Household Ministry. In 1884, he was ennobled with the title of viscount (shishaku) under the kazoku peerage system. He also enrolled in Keio University, where he studied the English language.

Oda Nobutoshi Oda clan Born: 1853 Died: 6 June 1901
Preceded by Oda Nobumichi	3rd Daimyō of Tendō; 1868	Succeeded by Oda Suemaru
Preceded by Oda Suemaru	5th Daimyō of Tendō; 1869–1871	Succeeded by none (domain abolished)
Preceded by Oda Nobumichi	11th Oda family head (desc. from Nobukatsu); 1868	Succeeded by Oda Suemaru
Preceded by Oda Suemaru	13th Oda family head (desc. from Nobukatsu); 1868–1901	Succeeded by Oda Nobutsune
