= Battle of Toba–Fushimi =

1868 battle of the Boshin War in Fushimi, Kyoto, Japan

- Part of the Boshin War
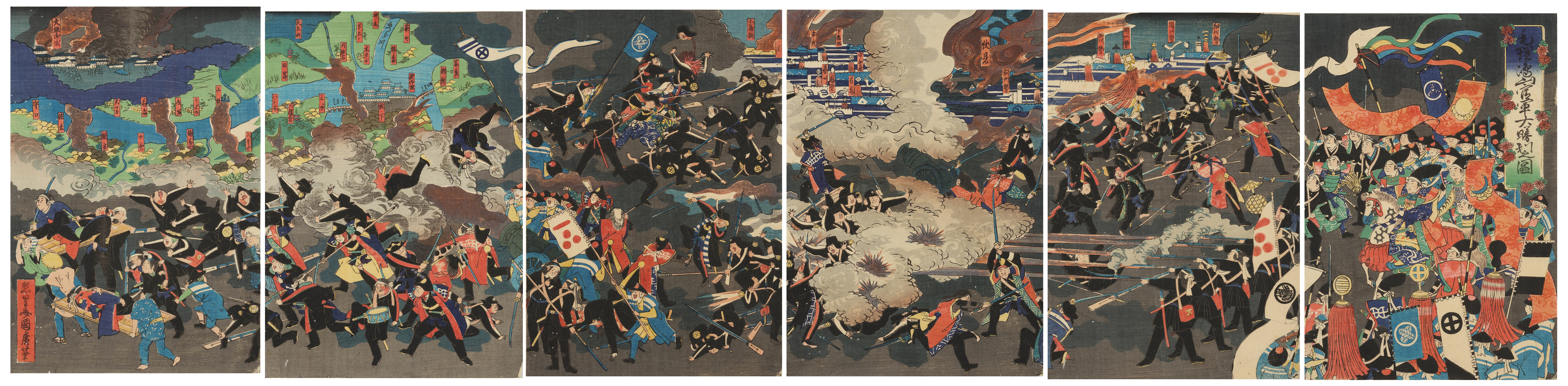
- Retreat of Shogunal forces in front of the Imperial army. Yodo Castle is shown in the background.
Date	27–31 January 1868
Location	Area between Kyoto and Osaka 35°00′42″N 135°46′05″E
Result	Imperial victory

Belligerents
Satsuma Domain; Chōshū Domain; Tosa Domain; Tsu Domain	Tokugawa shogunate; Aizu Domain; Takamatsu Domain; Ōtaki Domain

Commanders and leaders
Chief of General Staff: Prince Ninnaji; Satchōdo Army: Saigō Takamori; Kirino Toshiaki; Ijichi Masaharu; Murata Tsuneyoshi; Yamaji Motoharu; Itagaki Taisuke	Governor-General: Ōkōchi Masatada; Shogunate Army: Takenaka Shigekata; Matsudaira Sadaaki; Shinsengumi: Hijikata Toshizō; Nagakura Shinpachi; Yūgekitai: Takahashi Deishū

Strength
5,000	15,000

Casualties and losses
326 killed and wounded	895 killed and wounded

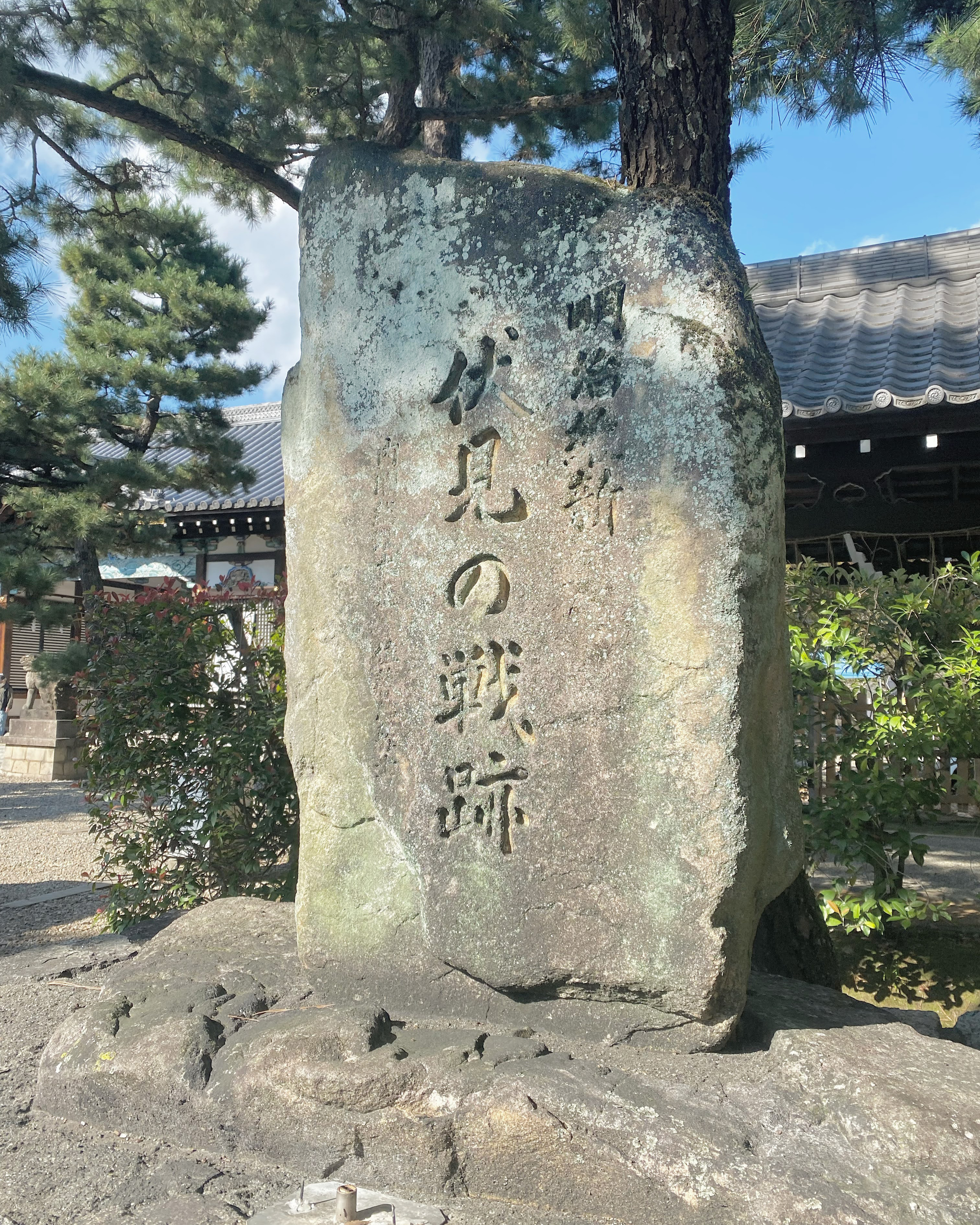
Monument of The Battle of Toba–Fushimi

The Battle of Toba–Fushimi (鳥羽・伏見の戦い, Toba-Fushimi no Tatakai) occurred between pro-Imperial and Tokugawa shogunate forces during the Boshin War in Japan. The battle started on 27 January 1868 (or fourth year of Keiō, first month, 3rd day, according to the lunar calendar), when the forces of the shogunate and the allied forces of Chōshū, Satsuma and Tosa Domains clashed near Fushimi, a town near Kyoto, the sacred capital, and fighting progressed to the Toba road leading to Osaka, with the initial rout of the Satsuma from Fushimi. The battle lasted for four days, ending in a decisive defeat for the shogunate.

== Background ==
On 3 January 1868, the restoration of imperial rule was formally proclaimed. Shōgun Tokugawa Yoshinobu had earlier resigned his authority to the emperor, agreeing to "be the instrument for carrying out" imperial orders. The Tokugawa shogunate had ended. However, while Yoshinobu's resignation created a nominal void at the highest level of government, his apparatus of state continued to exist. Moreover, the Tokugawa family remained a prominent force in the evolving political order, Tokugawa also continued to effect intrigues to aid his position, including ordering a summon for all the daimyōs to Osaka, without setting a date. The Tokugawa family also retained a very large domain around Edo, valued at more than 2 million Koku, a prospect hard-liners from Satsuma and Chōshū found intolerable.

Although the majority of fifteen-year-old Emperor Meiji's consultative assembly was happy with the formal declaration of direct rule by the court and tended to support a continued collaboration with the Tokugawa, Saigō Takamori physically threatened members of the assembly into ordering the confiscation of Yoshinobu's lands. (Note: During a recess, Saigō, who had his troops outside, "remarked that it would take only one short sword to settle the discussion". Original quotation (in Japanese): "短刀一本あればかたづくことだ." in Hagiwara, p. 42.)

Although he initially agreed to the court's demands, on 17 January 1868, Yoshinobu declared "that he would not be bound by the proclamation of the restoration and called on the court to rescind it." On 24 January, after considerable provocation by Satsuma's rōnin in Edo, Yoshinobu, from his base at Osaka Castle decided to prepare an attack on Kyōto, ostensibly to dislodge the Satsuma and Chōshū elements dominating the court and "freeing" young Emperor Meiji from their influence.

== Prelude ==
The battle started when shogunate forces moved in the direction of Kyoto to deliver a letter from Yoshinobu, warning the Emperor of the intrigues plotted by Satsuma and the court nobles who supported it, such as Iwakura Tomomi.

The 15,000-strong shogunal army outnumbered the Satsuma–Chōshū army by three to one, and consisted mostly of men from the Kuwana and Aizu Domains, reinforced by Shinsengumi irregulars. Although some of its members were mercenaries, others, such as the Denshūtai, had received training from French military advisers. Some of the men deployed in the front lines were armed in archaic fashion, with pikes and swords. For example, the troops of Aizu had a combination of modern soldiers and samurai, as did the troops of Satsuma to a lesser degree. The Bakufu had almost fully equipped troops and Chōshū troops were the most modern and organized of all. According to historian Conrad Totman: "In terms of army organization and weaponry, the four main protagonists probably rank in this order: Chōshū was best; Bakufu infantry was next; Satsuma was next; and Aizu and most liege vassal forces were last."

There was no clearly defined intent to fight on the part of the shogunate troops, attested by the many empty rifles of the men in the vanguard. Motivation and leadership on the part of the shogunate also seems to have been lacking.

Although the forces of Chōshū and Satsuma were outnumbered, they were fully modernized with Armstrong howitzers, Minié rifles and one Gatling gun. The shogunate forces had been slightly lagging in term of equipment, although a core elite force had been recently trained by the French military mission to Japan (1867–68). The Shogun also relied on troops supplied by allied domains, which were not necessarily as advanced in terms of military equipment and methods, making up an army that had both modern and outdated elements.

The Royal Navy, generally supportive of Satsuma and Chōshū, maintained a fleet lying at anchor in Osaka harbour, a factor of uncertainty which led to the shogunate maintaining the garrison at Osaka with a significant part of its army in reserve rather than commit them to the offensive in Kyōto. This foreign naval presence was related to the protection orders for the foreign settlements at Hyōgo (modern Kobe), and the very recent opening of the ports of Hyōgo and Ōsaka by decree to foreign trade three weeks earlier on 1 January 1868. Tokugawa Yoshinobu was in bed with a severe chill, and could not participate directly in the operations.

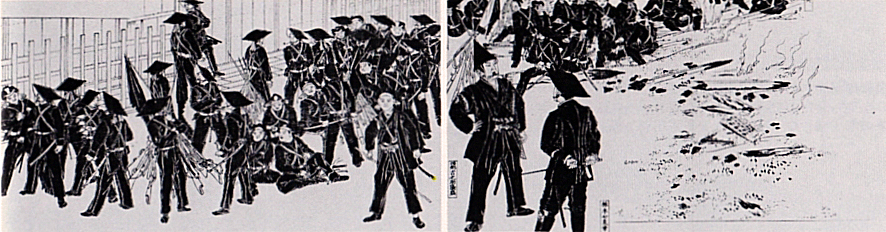
Saigō Takamori (with tall helmet) inspecting Chōshū troops at Fushimi

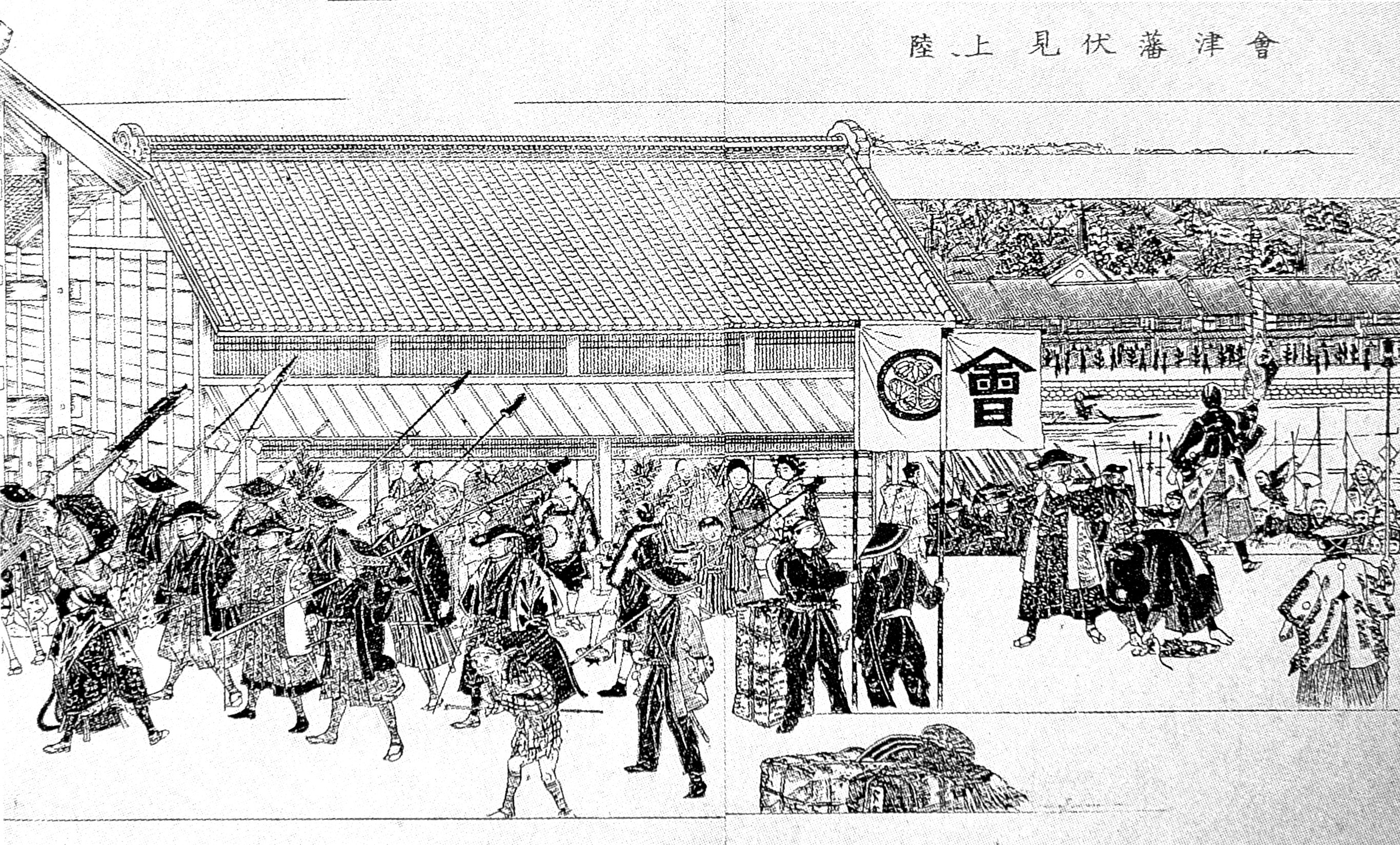
Aizu troops disembarking at Fushimi: a combination of old-fashioned samurai with pikes (left), and modern troops with firearms (appearing on the right)

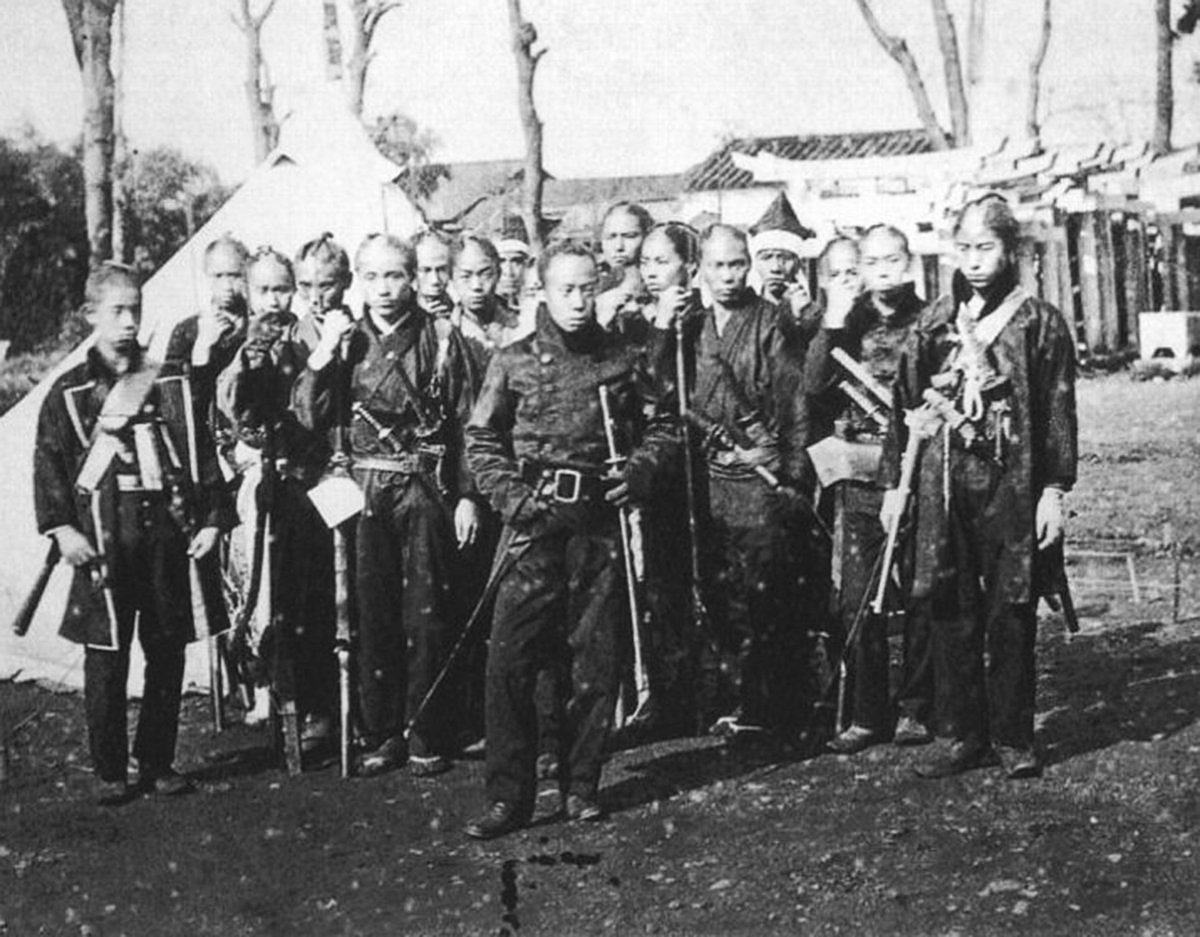
Shogunate soldiers; the soldier in front is wearing a Western-style uniform.

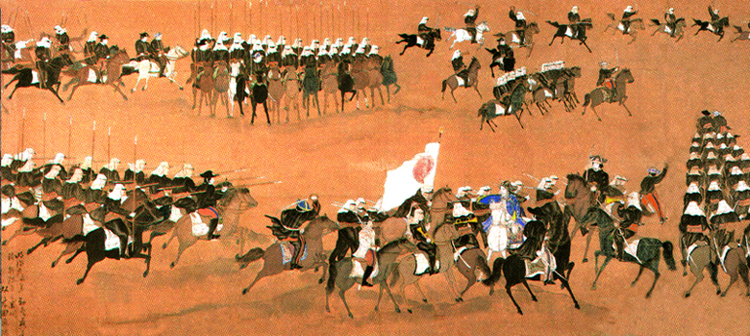
French-trained Denshūtai troops

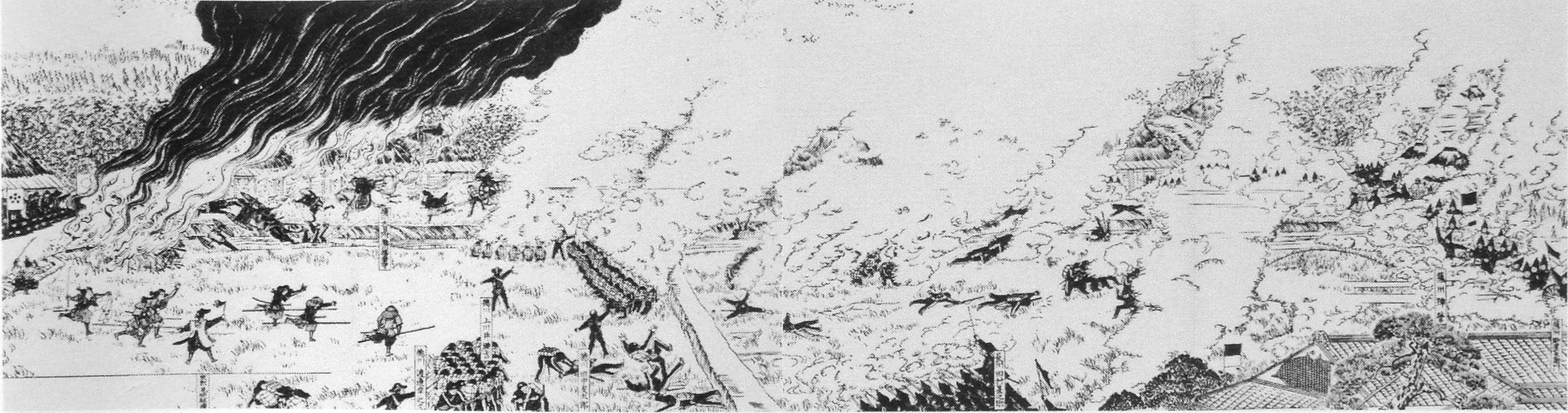
Battle of Toba–Fushimi

== Events of 27 January ==
On 27 January 1868 (Note: Japanese calendar: 正月３日) Tokugawa Yoshinobu, based at Osaka Castle, south of Kyoto, started to move his troops north to Kyoto, through two main roads, one being the Toba road (鳥羽街道), and the other the Fushimi road (伏見街道). Altogether about 13,000 troops were moving forward, although they were widely spread out, leaving about 8,500 for the action at Toba–Fushimi. The overall commander (rikugun bugyō) of the operation was Takenaka Shigekata.

=== Toba encounter ===
The shogunate forces move in the direction of Toba under the command of Vice-Commander Ōkubo Tadayuki, making a total of 2,000 to 2,500 troops. At around 17:00, the shogunate vanguard, made up largely of about 400 men of the Mimawarigumi, armed with pikes and some firearms, under Sasaki Tadasaburo, approached a Satsuma-manned barrier post at the Koeda Bridge (小枝橋), Toba (located in what is now part of Minami-ku, Kyoto). They were followed by two infantry battalions (歩兵), rifles empty as they did not expect a fight, under Tokuyama Kōtarō, and further south by eight companies from Kuwana with four cannons. Some Matsuyama and Takamatsu troops and a few others were also participating, but Bakufu cavalry and artillery seem to have been absent. In front of them were about 900 entrenched troops from Satsuma, with four cannons.

After denying the shogunate force permission to pass peacefully, the Satsuma force opened fire from the flank, the first shots of the Boshin War. A Satsuma shell exploded on a gun carriage next to the horse of shogunal commander Takigawa Tomotaka, causing the horse to throw Takigawa and bolt. The startled horse ran wild, throwing the shogunate column into panic and disarray. The Satsuma attack was forceful and quickly sent the shogunate troops in disarray and retreat.

Sasaki ordered his men to charge the Satsuma gunners, but since the Mimawarigumi was armed only with spears and swords, his men were killed en masse. However, the Kuwana forces and a unit under Kubota Shigeaki held their ground, making the skirmish rage on inconclusively. The Shogunate troops set fire to various houses as they retreated, but that allowed Satsuma snipers to aim more easily. The situation stabilized during the night, as troops from Kuwana arrived in reinforcement.

The Toba battlefield has been transformed into a public park, Tobarikyūato-kōen (鳥羽離宮跡公園), which contains a monument to the battle. It is located just between the Koeda Bridge, where the Satsuma forces were stationed, and the Jōnangū Temple (城南宮), where the Imperial forces had their headquarters.

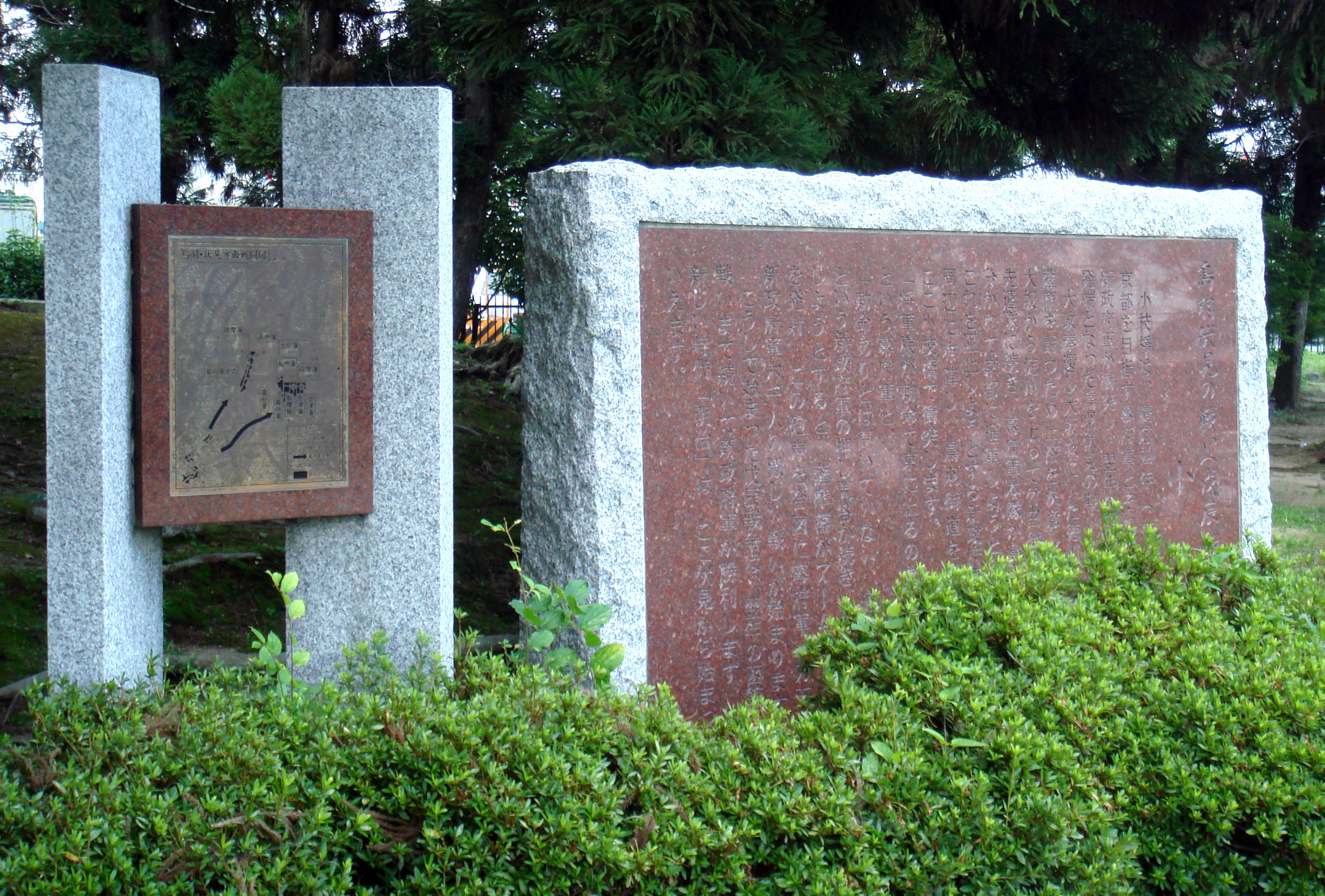
The monument at Koedabashi (小枝橋) in Tobarikyuato park (鳥羽離宮跡公園), Kyoto, where the Toba–Fushimi battle started.

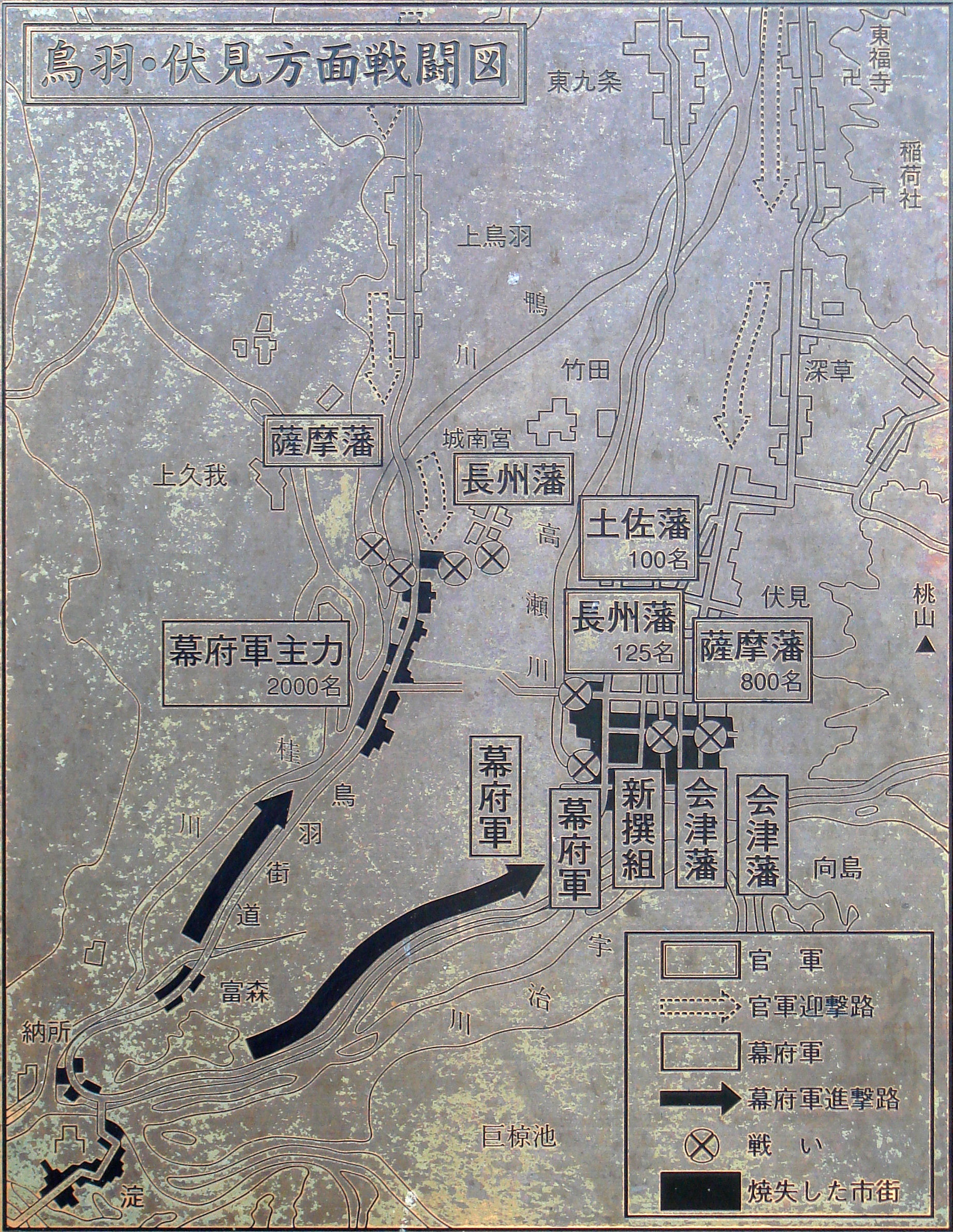
Map of the initial encounters, on the first day of the battle, 27 January (detail of the monument).

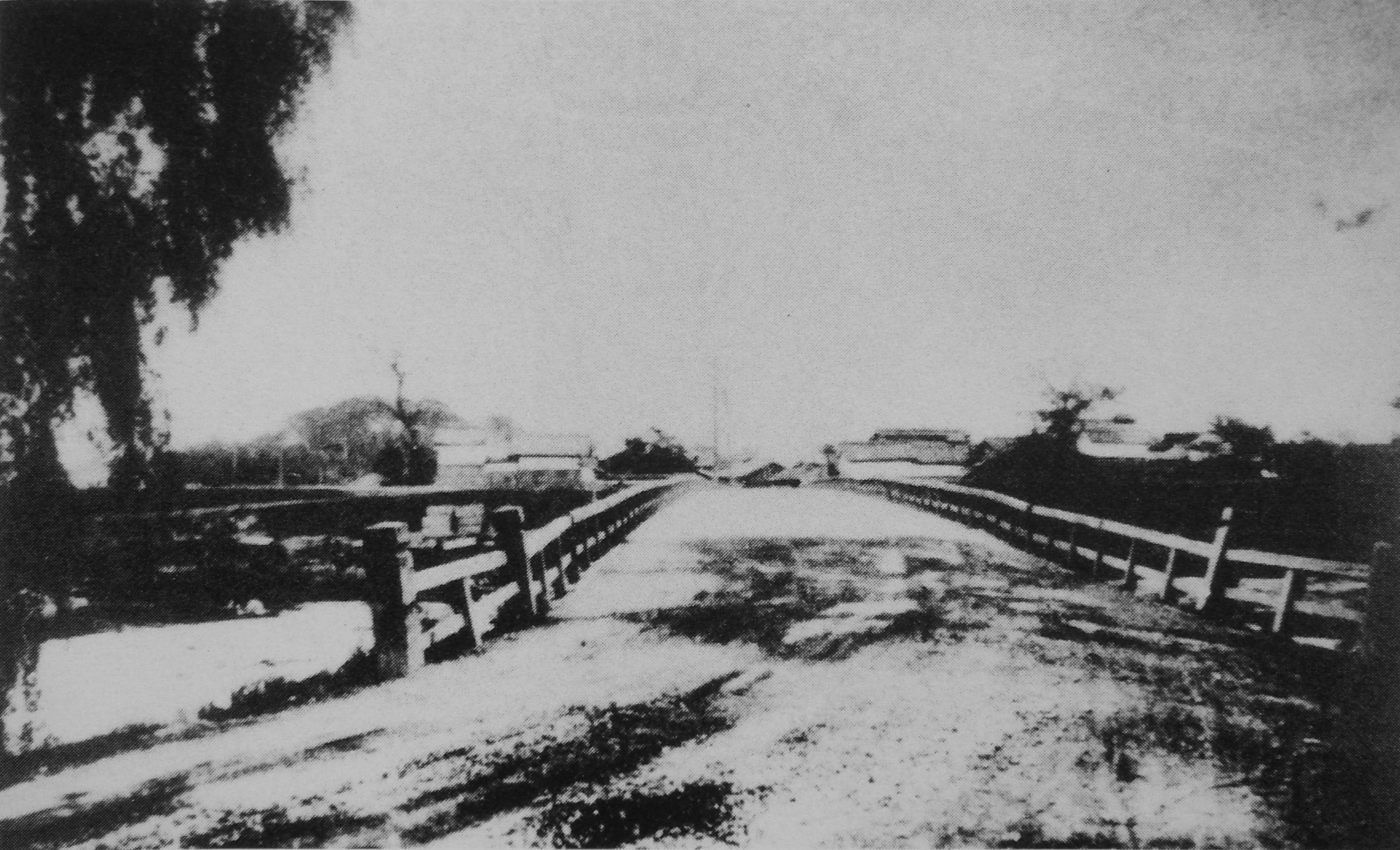
Old Koeda Bridge in 1867, where the battle at Toba began

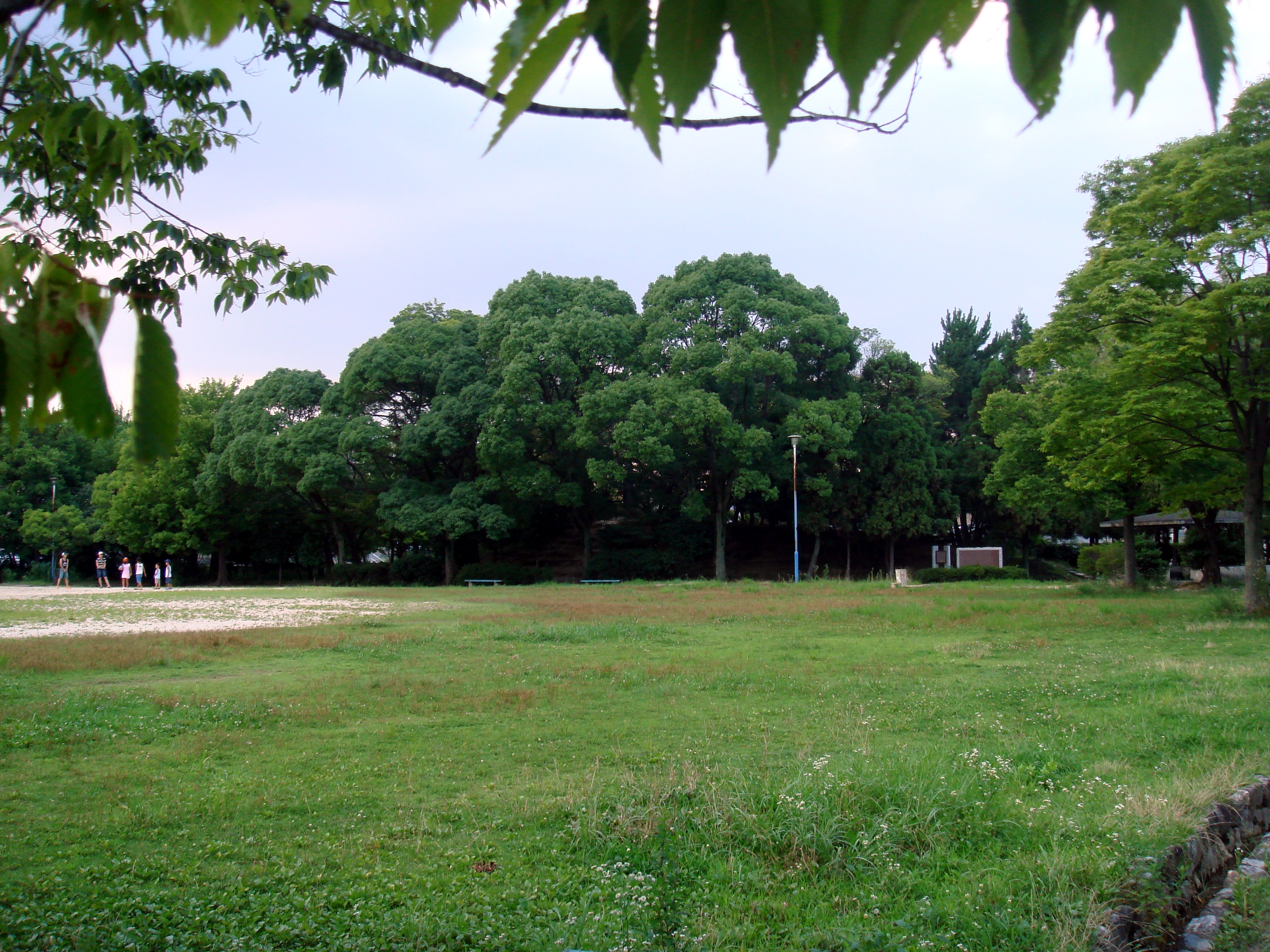
Location of the Toba battlefield today (鳥羽離宮跡公園)

=== Fushimi encounter ===
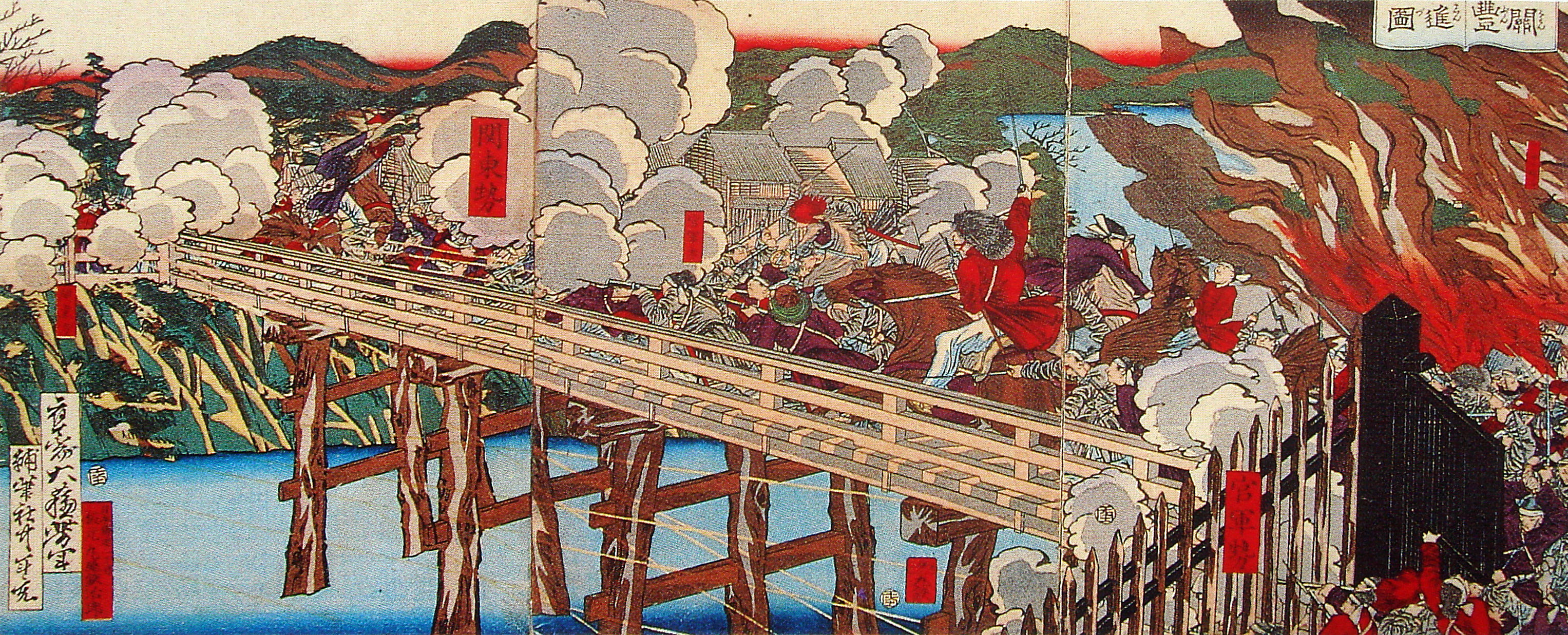
Fushimi encounter at Bungobashi Bridge (豊後橋). Imperial troops are on the right, Shogunal troops on the left.

On the same day, Satsuma–Chōshū forces further to the southeast at Fushimi also inconclusively engaged Shogunal forces in their area. The Satsuma–Chōshū forces started firing on the Shogunal forces when they heard the firing of cannons from the area of Toba. The Shogunal forces were composed of Bakufu troops, Shinsengumi and Aizu troops.

A violent encounter took place for the control of Bungo Bridge (豊後橋).

== Events of 28 January ==
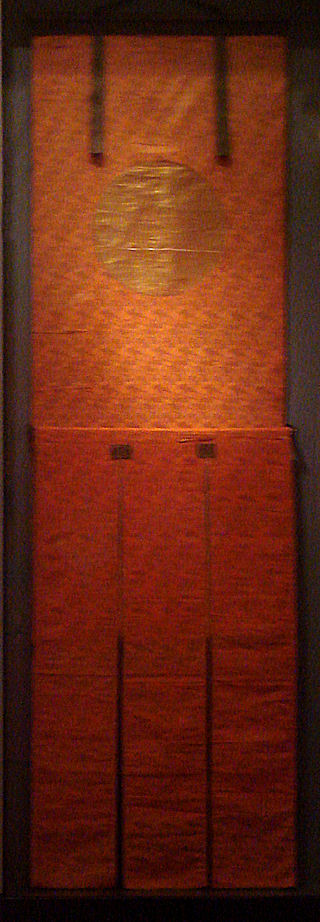
Imperial banner deployed at Toba–Fushimi

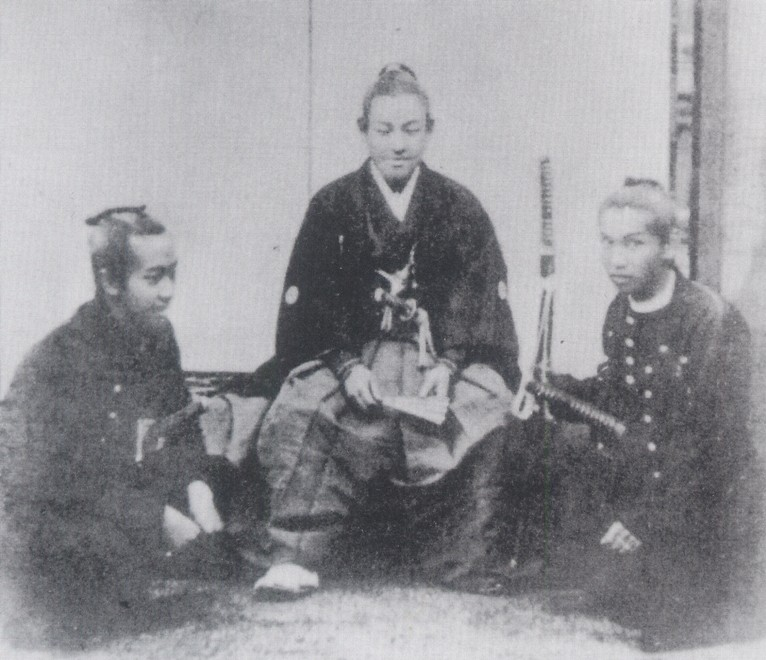
Imperial Prince Yoshiaki was named nominal commander-in-chief of the army.

On 28 January, Iwakura Tomomi gave Saigō Takamori and Ōkubo Toshimichi orders obtained from Emperor Meiji proclaiming Tokugawa Yoshinobu and his followers to be enemies of the court, authorizing their suppression by military force, and granting use of the Imperial brocade banners. These brocade banners were prepared beforehand, having been made by Ōkubo Toshimichi a few months previously, and stored in Chōshū domain and in the Satsuma Kyoto residence until an appropriate opportunity presented itself.

In addition, Imperial Prince Yoshiaki, a young man of 22, who had lived as a Buddhist monk at the monzeki temple of Ninna-ji was named nominal commander in chief of the army. Although the Prince had no military experience, this nomination effectively transformed the Satsuma-Chōshū Alliance forces into an Imperial army (kangun), which proved to be a powerful tool of psychological warfare, sending shogunal forces into confusion and disarray, since anyone who fired on the army would automatically become a traitor to the emperor.

The Bakufu forces that had been to Toba retreated and regrouped with other Bakufu troops at Tominomori (富の森), where they set up their command base.

Meanwhile, the Battle of Awa took place that same day on the nearby Inland Sea. It was the first naval battle between modern fleets in Japan, and ended with a small shogunal victory over a Satsuma fleet, but was insignificant to the unfolding of the land battle.

=== Takasegawa encounter ===
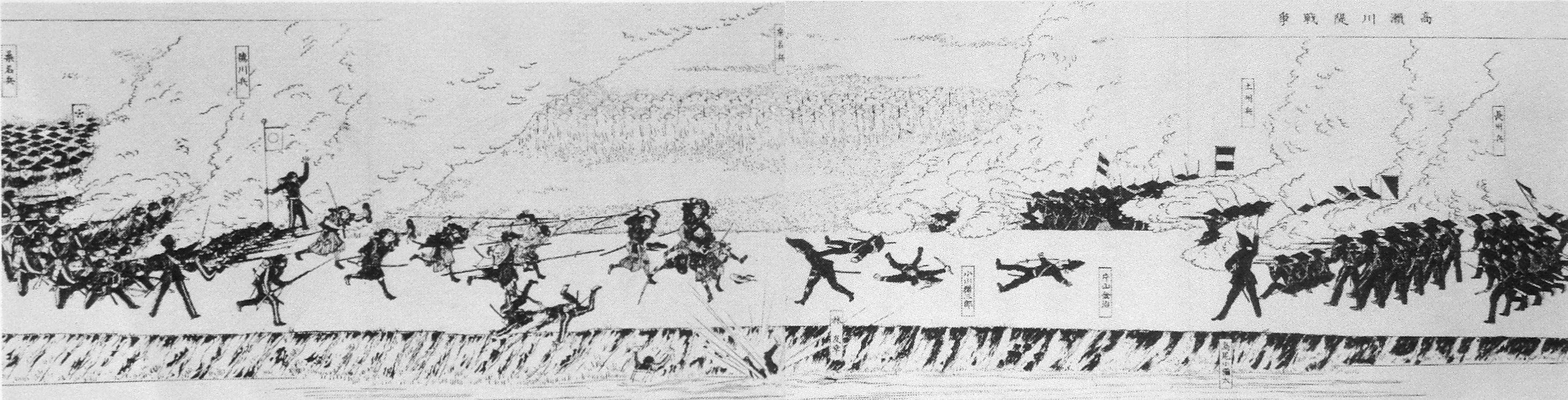
Takasegawa encounter. Shogunate forces are visible on the left, while the pro-Imperial forces of Tosa, Chōshū and Satsuma are visible on the right.

The forces which had been to Fushimi, consisting in Aizu troops, Shinsengumi and Yūgekitai (遊撃隊) guerilla troops were again attacked at Takasegawa (高瀬川) and Ujigawa (宇治川) on the morning of the 28th by the troops of Satsuma and Chōshū, and were forced to retreat in the direction of Yodo Castle after a bitter fight.

== Events of 29 January ==
=== Tominomori encounter ===
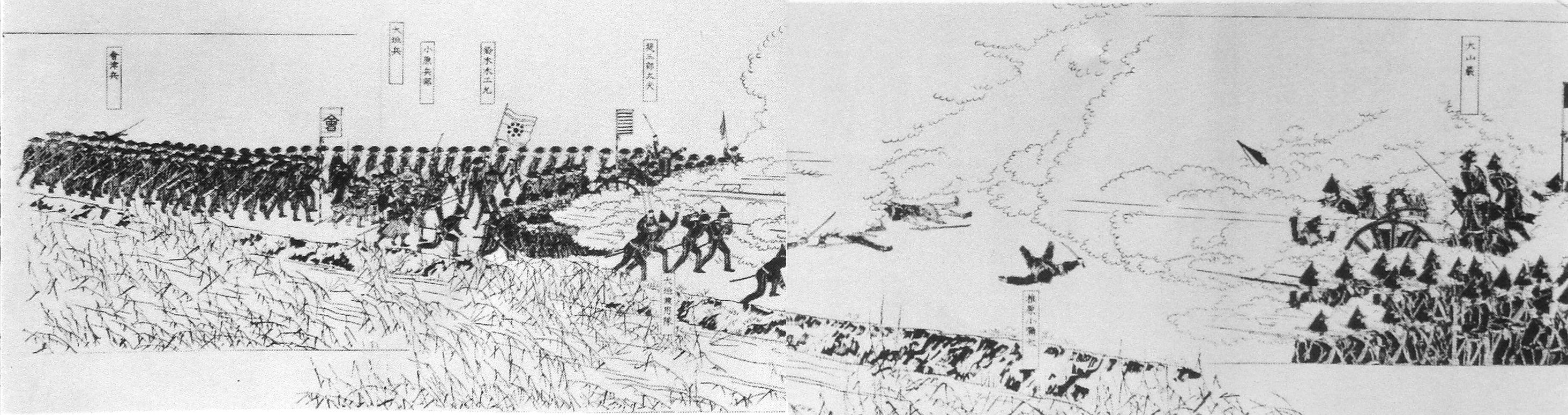
Encounter at Tominomori, on 29 January. Shogunal troops are on the left including Aizu forces, and on the right Satsuma troops and Chōshū troops.

The Shogunal forces which had regrouped at Tominomori (富の森) were attacked by the forces of Satsuma in the morning. Around noon, the Imperial brocade banner appeared from behind the Satsuma–Chōshū lines. At first, neither side recognized the strange banner. Messengers had to be sent to both sides to explain what it was. Shogunal forces were thrown into confusion and Satsuma-Chōshū forces, their morale boosted, drew swords and charged the shogunal lines. The shogunal forces attempted to counter-attack, but were forced to retreat in disarray. In the afternoon, the Shogunal forces had once again to retreat to the area of Nōsho (納所), in the direction of the Yodo Castle.

Shogunal forces attempted to regroup at Yodo Castle, but were refused admission, as the daimyō of Yodo Domain had decided to defect to the Imperial side on the appearance of the Imperial banner and defeat of the Shogunal forces. The daimyō of Yodo maintained his gates closed despite the supplication of the retreating army, thus denying them a major means of defense, forcing them to flee as far as Osaka castle. The daimyō of strategically located Tsu Domain followed two days later.

== Events of 30 January ==
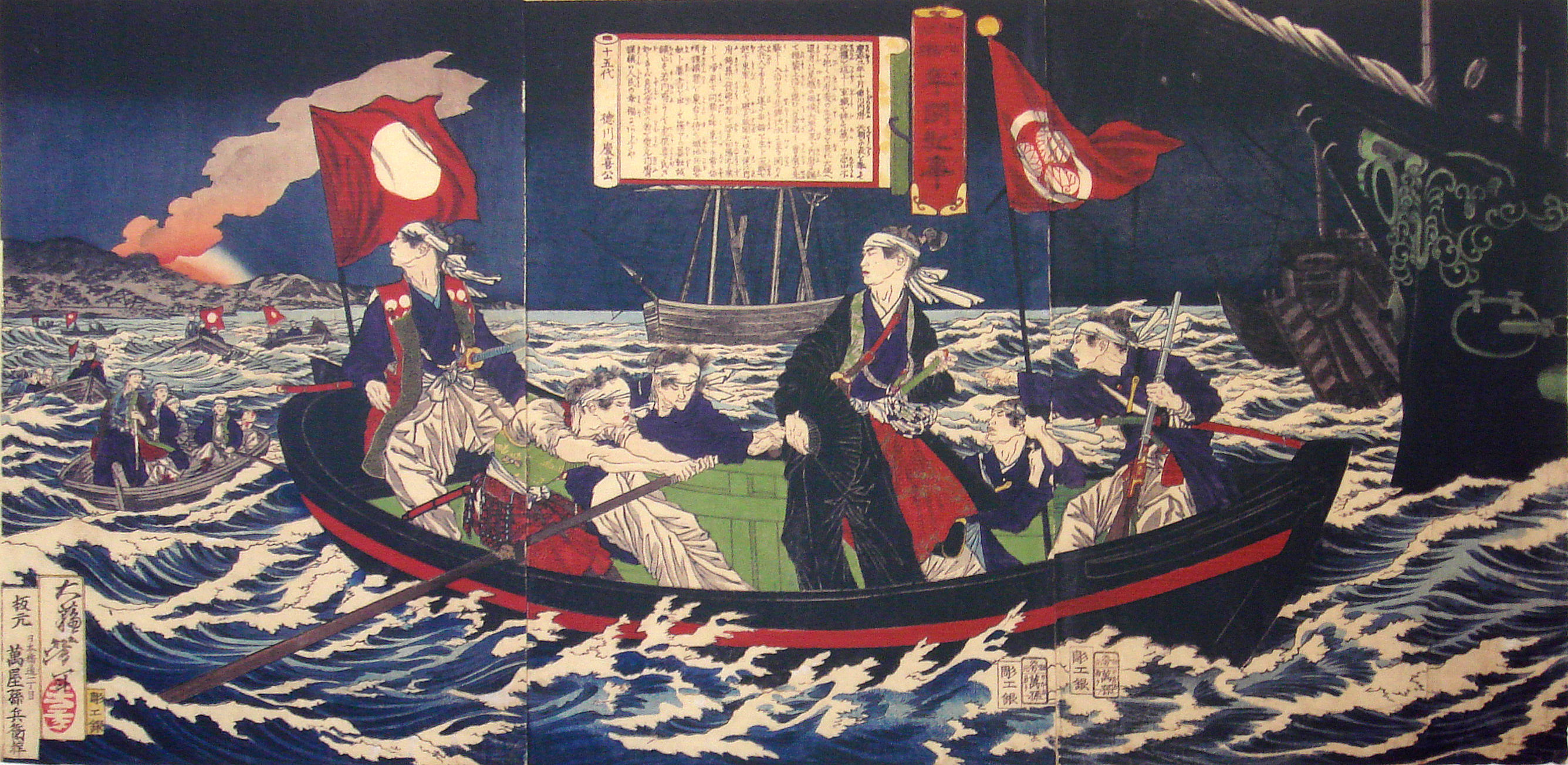
Tokugawa Yoshinobu leaving for Edo, looking at the fire at Osaka Castle in the background

The retreating shogunal troops were progressively streaming into Osaka Castle.

At Osaka Castle, Tokugawa Yoshinobu gathered his advisors and military leaders to plan strategy and, to boost morale, advised that he would personally take to the field as commander of bakufu forces. That evening however, he slipped away from Osaka Castle accompanied by the daimyōs of Aizu and Kuwana to escape back to Edo on the shogunate warship Kaiyō Maru.

As Kaiyō Maru had not arrived, he took refuge for the night on an American warship, USS Iroquois, anchored in Osaka Bay. Kaiyō Maru arrived the following day.

When the remnants of his forces learned that the shōgun had abandoned them, they departed Osaka Castle, which was later surrendered to Imperial forces without resistance. Yoshinobu later claimed that he had been disturbed by the Imperial approval given to the actions of Satsuma and Chōshū, and, once the brocade banner had appeared, he had lost all will to fight.

French advisors Jules Brunet and Cazeneuve, who were present at the battle, left Osaka and returned to Edo on 12 January, together with Enomoto Takeaki on board the Fujiyama. Enomoto brought with him various documents and a treasure of 180,000 ryō. They arrived in Edo on 14 January.

== Aftermath ==
The effects of the Battle of Toba–Fushimi were out of proportion to its small scale. The prestige and morale of the Tokugawa bakufu was seriously weakened, and many daimyōs who had remained neutral now declared in favor of the Emperor and offered military support to prove their new loyalties. Even more significantly, the ill-conceived attempt by Tokugawa Yoshinobu to regain control silenced elements within the new imperial government who favored a peaceful resolution to the conflict.

Osaka Castle, an important symbol of Tokugawa hegemony over western Japan, fell to Imperial forces. The victory set a course for a military settlement rather than a political compromise.

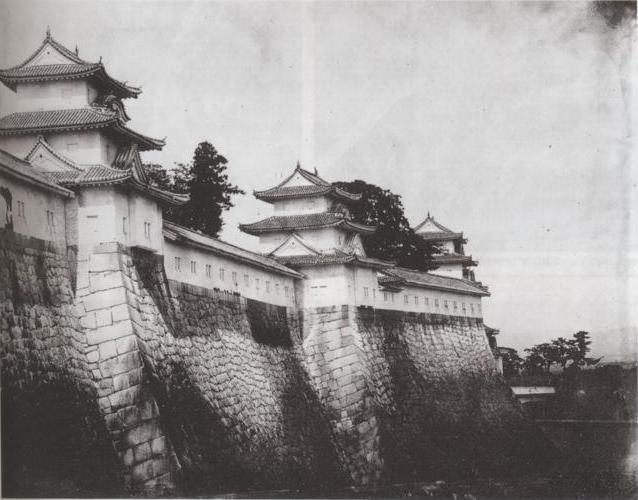
Osaka Castle rampart in 1865

== See also ==
- Firearms of Japan

== General and cited references ==
- Fukushima Hiroshi (1990). Bakumatsu Ishin: Yume no Ato Kikō. Tokyo: Kyōiku Shoseki.
- Hillsborough, Romulus (2005). Shinsengumi: The Shogun's Last Samurai Corps. Tuttle Publishing. ISBN 0-8048-3627-2.
- Keene, Donald (2002). Emperor of Japan: Meiji and His World, 1852–1912. New York: Columbia University Press. ISBN 9780231123402. OCLC 237548044.
- Satow, Ernest (1968) [1921]. A Diplomat in Japan. Tokyo: Oxford.
- Sims, Richard (1998). French Policy Towards the Bakufu and Meiji Japan 1854–1894. RoutledgeCurzon. ISBN 1-873410-61-1.
- Sims, Richard (2001). Japanese Political History Since the Meiji Renovation 1868–2000. Palgrave Macmillan. ISBN 0-312-23915-7.
- Totman, Conrad (1980). Collapse of the Tokugawa Bakufu, 1862–1868. Honolulu: University of Hawai'i Press. ISBN 0-82480-614-X.
- Yamakawa Kenjirō (1926). Hōshu Aizu Byakkōtai Jūkyūshi-den. Aizu-Wakamatsu: Aizu Chōrei Gikai.
- Yamakawa Kenjirō (1933). Aizu Boshin Senshi. Tokyo: Tokyo Daigaku Shuppankai.
