= Matsudaira Sadaaki =

Japanese daimyō

- 松平 定敬
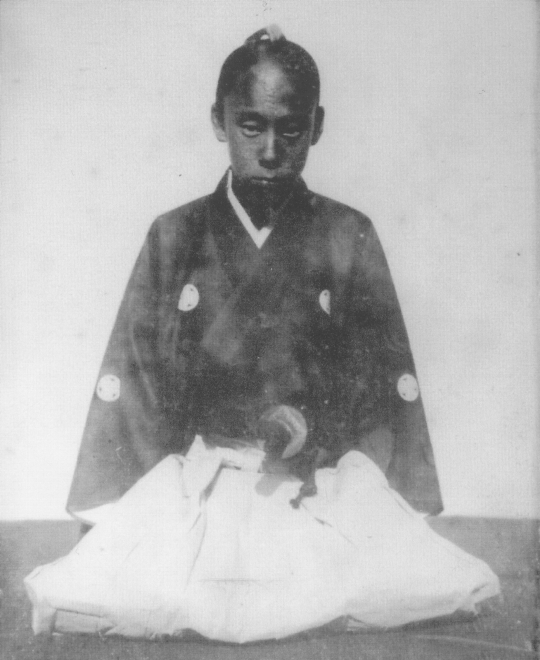
- Sadaaki in 1862
- Preceded by: Matsudaira Sadamichi
- Succeeded by: Matsudaira Sadanori

4th Daimyō of Kuwana Domain
- In office 1859–1868
- Monarchs: Shōgun: Tokugawa Iemochi; Tokugawa Yoshinobu

56th Kyoto Shoshidai
- In office 1864–1867
- Preceded by: Inaba Masakuni
- Succeeded by: none

Personal details
- Born: January 18, 1847 Edo, Japan
- Died: July 12, 1908 (aged 61)
- Spouse: Matsudaira Hatsu
- Domestic partner: Daughter of Bessho Gihei
- Parent: Matsudaira Yoshitatsu (father)

Matsudaira Sadaaki (松平 定敬; January 18, 1847 – July 12, 1908) was a Japanese daimyō of the Bakumatsu period, who was the last ruler of the Kuwana Domain. Sadaaki was the adopted heir of Matsudaira Sadamichi, the descendant of Sadatsuna, the third son of Hisamatsu Sadakatsu (1569–1623), who was Tokugawa Ieyasu's brother. His family was known as the Hisamatsu Matsudaira clan. It was to this family that Matsudaira Sadanobu also belonged.

== Biography ==
=== Early history ===
Matsudaira Tetsunosuke (the future Sadaaki) was born at Ichigaya in Edo, the 8th son of Matsudaira Yoshitatsu, daimyō of Takasu Domain. His older brothers included Matsudaira Katamori, who later became daimyō of Aizu and Tokugawa Yoshikatsu and Tokugawa Mochinaga of Owari Domain In 1859, Tetsunosuke was posthumously adopted to succeed Matsudaira Sadamich] as daimyō of the Kuwana Domain. He was betrothed to Sadamichi's 3-year-old daughter Matsudaira Hatsu, thus formalizing the adoption. He was give the courtesy title of Etchū-no-kami and Lower 5th court rank. Coming of age, he took the name Sadaaki.Two years later, in 1863, he was assigned to accompany Shogun Tokugawa Iemochi to Kyoto, as the shogun had been summoned by Emperor Kōmei to report on progress on expelling the foreigners from Japan. This was the first time since the visit of Tokugawa Iemitsu in the Kan'ei era, 230 years before, that a Shogun had visited Kyoto.

=== Kyoto Shoshidai ===
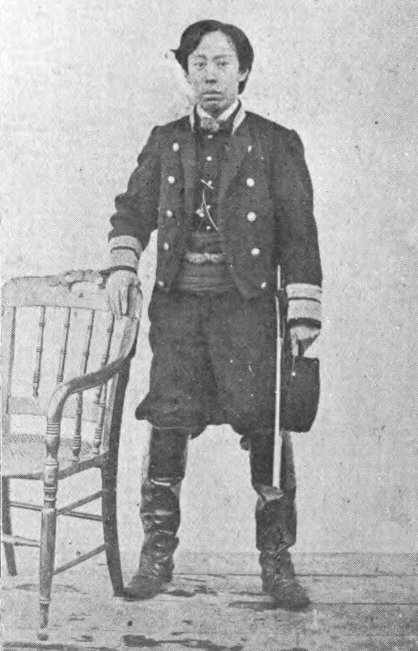
Matsudaira Sadaaki in Western uniform during the Battle of Hakodate

Matsudaira Sadaaki was appointed Kyoto Shoshidai in the period spanning May 16, 1864, through January 3, 1868 and was thus the last person to hold this post. This was an important administrative and political office, essentially the shōgun's deputy in the Kyoto region, and was responsible for maintaining good relations and open communication between the shogunate and the imperial court and for the administration of Kyoto and its eight surrounding provinces. This was an unusual appointment, as the post of Kyoto Shoshidai was normally held by a fudai daimyō of greater experience who had previously held the post of Osaka-jō dai.

As Kyoto Shoshidai, Sadaaki supported his brother Matsudaira Katamori, who had been appointed Kyoto Shugoshoku. This was a new nearly co-equal office established only in September 1862, responsible for security within Kyoto and for arranging the punitive Chōshū expedition. In 1864, Sadaaki deployed Kuwana troops during the Kinmon incident and as part of the shogunate's effort to subdue the Tengu-tō uprising. Under Shogun Tokugawa Yoshinobu, he was accorded the same authority as a rōjū. During these years Sadaaki was famous as an avid horseman, and received an imported Arabian horse as a gift from the Shogunate. He was noted for riding the streets for Kyoto with short hair and in western military attire.

=== Boshin War ===
On November 9, 1867, Tokugawa Yoshinobu tendered his resignation to the Emperor and formally stepped down ten days later; the positions of Kyoto Shoshidai and Kyoto Shugoshoku were also abolished. Yoshinobu, Katamori and Sadaaki withdrew to Osaka Castle and a large military force from Satsuma and Chōshū occupied Kyoto, demanding that the Tokugawa and its cadet houses (including the Matsudaira) be stripped of their title and domains. Tokugawa forces were attacked outside Kyoto, starting the Battle of Toba–Fushimi, the first clash of the Boshin War. Yoshinobu fled to Edo, leaving his troops, including Sadaaki behind. Unable to return to Kuwana, as the Satchō Alliance army was in the way, he travelled instead to Kashiwazaki in Echigo Province, as this was an exclave of Kawana Domain, using a Prussian steamship "Costa Rica" from Osaka. After the Battle of Kujiranami, he retreated to Aizu, where he rejoined his brother Katamori until the start of the Siege of Aizu. Katamori asked him to leave and seek reinforcements from the other clans of the Northern Alliance. Sadaaki followed his brother's advice and headed for the Yonezawa Domain. After the fall of Yonezawa and the defeat of the Ōuetsu Reppan Dōmei, Sadaaki embarked on Enomoto Takeaki's warships at Matsushima Bay, and went on to the Ezo Republic. With the fall of then Republic of Ezo imminent at the Battle of Hakodate, he boarded an American ship and fled to Shanghai via Yokohama intending to go into exile in America or Europe, but lacking funds, he returned to Yokohama, where he formally surrendered to the new government. During this period, Kuwano Domain itself had been left all but defenseless. Kuwana Castle surrendered to imperial forces without resistance, and Sadaaki's adoptive son and heir, Matsudaira Sadanori was held at Kuwana under house arrest.

=== During the Meiji period ===
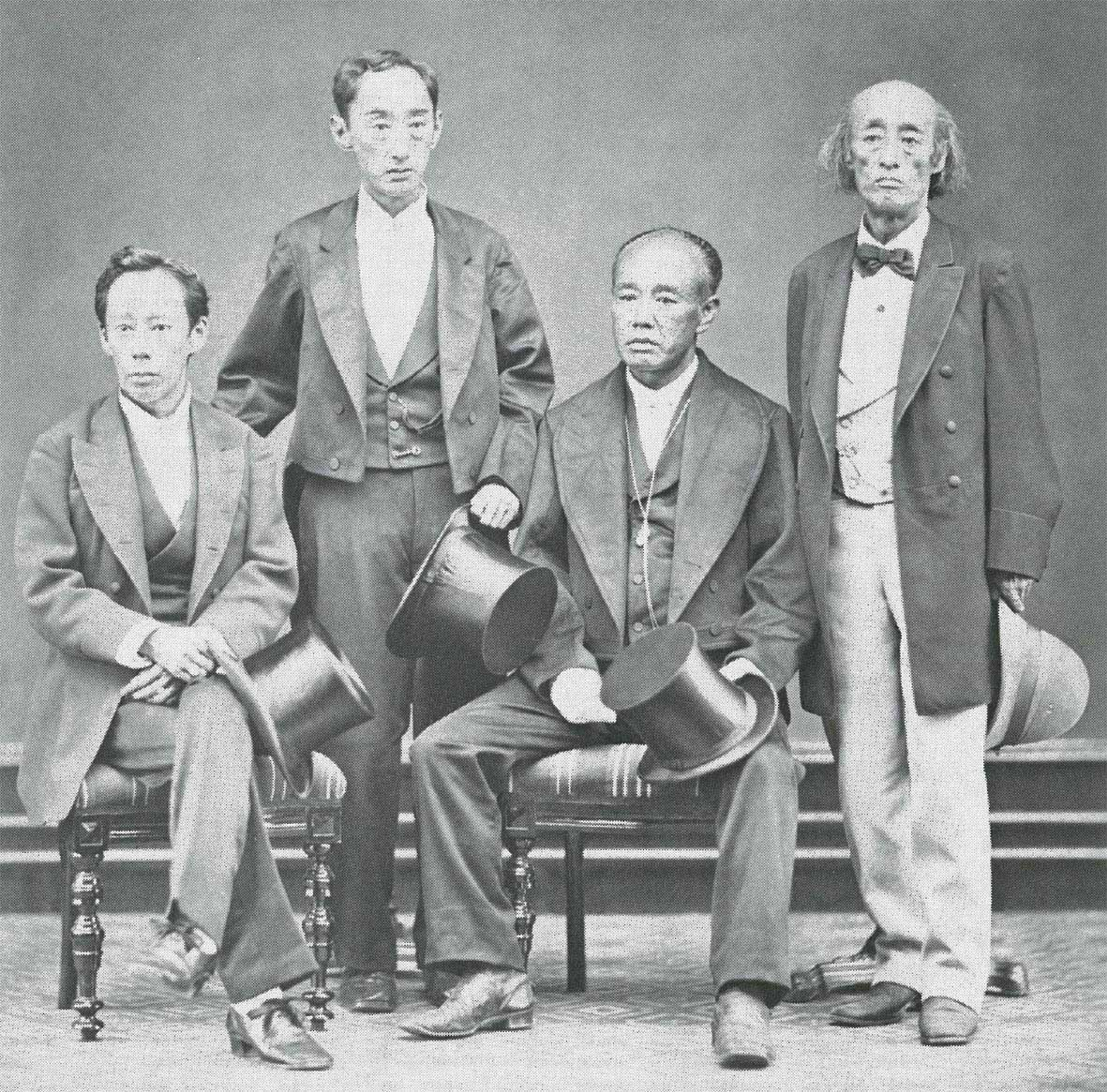
The "Four Brothers of Takasu". Left to right: Matsudaira Sadaaki, Matsudaira Katamori, Tokugawa Mochinaga, and Tokugawa Yoshikatsu

After a few years in confinement, Sadaaki was pardoned by the Meiji government and released in 1872. It was soon after his release that he finally formally married Matsudaira Hatsu, who had just turned 16. In November 1872, he applied for permission to travel to the United States, but was forced to cancel his plans due to illness. In 1873, together with his son Matsudaira Sadanori, he enrolled at a school founded by American missionary Samuel Robbins Brown to study the English language. He accompanied Sadanori to the United States in 1874 when he enrolled at Rutgers University

Sadaaki joined the Imperial Japanese Army during the 1877 Satsuma Rebellion, leading a group of former Kuwana samurai into combat in Kyūshū against the former Satsuma samurai he had fought in Aizu. Later in life, from 1894 he served as one of the kannushi of the Nikkō Tōshō-gū, along with his brother Katamori, and his brother's former chief karō, Saigō Tanomo. He also lived in Tokyo for some time, and had an avid interest in music; Clara Whitney, an American resident of Tokyo, notes in her diary that he was a skilled organ player.

Sadaaki and Hatsu had two children, Toshi and Masao, both of whom died in infancy. However, Sadaaki also had a concubine; it was this concubine who bore him a son (Sadaharu) who survived to adulthood. He also had a daughter by another woman; this daughter married Sakai Tadakazu.

Sadaaki died at age 61, and is buried in the Somei Cemetery in Tokyo.

== Cultural references ==
Matsudaira Sadaaki has appeared as a character in many works of fiction, usually in works about his brother and Aizu. In the 1987 TV miniseries Byakkotai, he was portrayed by Hashinosuke Nakamura. In NHK's 1998 Taiga drama Tokugawa Yoshinobu, Jō Watanabe portrayed him. He also appears briefly in episode 7 of the anime Clockwork Fighters, Hiwou's war.

== Notes ==
Preceded by Matsudaira Sadamichi	4th (Matsudaira) Daimyō of Kuwana; 1859–1868	Succeeded by Matsudaira Sadanori
Preceded by Inaba Masakuni	56th Kyoto Shoshidai; 1864–1867	Succeeded by none
