= Oda Suemaru =

Japanese daimyō

Viscount Oda Suemaru (織田 寿重丸; April 5, 1866 – June 26, 1871) was the fourth daimyō of the tozama feudal domain of Tendō, in Dewa Province, northern Japan.

== Family. ==
Oda Suemaru was a direct descendant of Oda Nobunaga, through Nobunaga's son Oda Nobukatsu. Suemaru was born as the sixth son of Oda Nobumichi (the 2nd Lord Tendō).

== Life ==
In December 1868, while Suemaru was still in an infant his brother, Oda Nobutoshi (the 3rd Lord Tendō) was placed under house arrest and ordered to retire due to his involvement in the Ōuetsu Reppan Dōmei rebellion of northern domains against the Meiji government during the Boshin War of the Meiji Restoration.

Nobutoshi was allowed to return to Tendō in July 1869. In the interim, Suemaru was given the title of “domain governor”, the title of daimyō had been replaced by the new government; Soon after Nobutoshi's return to Tendō, he replaced Suemaru as governor and final lord of Tendō.

Suemaru died at the age of six, and his grave is at the Buddhist temple of Korin-ji in Bunkyō, Tokyo.

Oda Suemaru Oda clan Born: 1853 Died: 6 June 1901
Preceded by Oda Nobutoshi	4th Daimyō of Tendō; 1868–1869	Succeeded by Oda Nobutoshi
Preceded by Oda Nobutoshi	12th Oda family head (desc. from Nobukatsu); 1868–1869	Succeeded by Oda Nobutoshi
