= Nobukazu =

- Gender: Male

Origin
- Origin: Japanese
- Meaning: Different meanings depending on the kanji used

Nobukazu (written: 延和, 伸和 or 信美) is a masculine Japanese given name. Notable people with the name include:

- Nobukazu Hirai (平井 伸和) (born 1969), Japanese professional wrestler
- Oda Nobukazu (織田 信美) (1793–1836), Japanese daimyō
- Nobukazu Takemura (竹村 延和) (born 1968), Japanese musician
