= Oda Nobutsune =

Japanese politician and manga author

Viscount Oda Nobutsune
- 織田 信恒
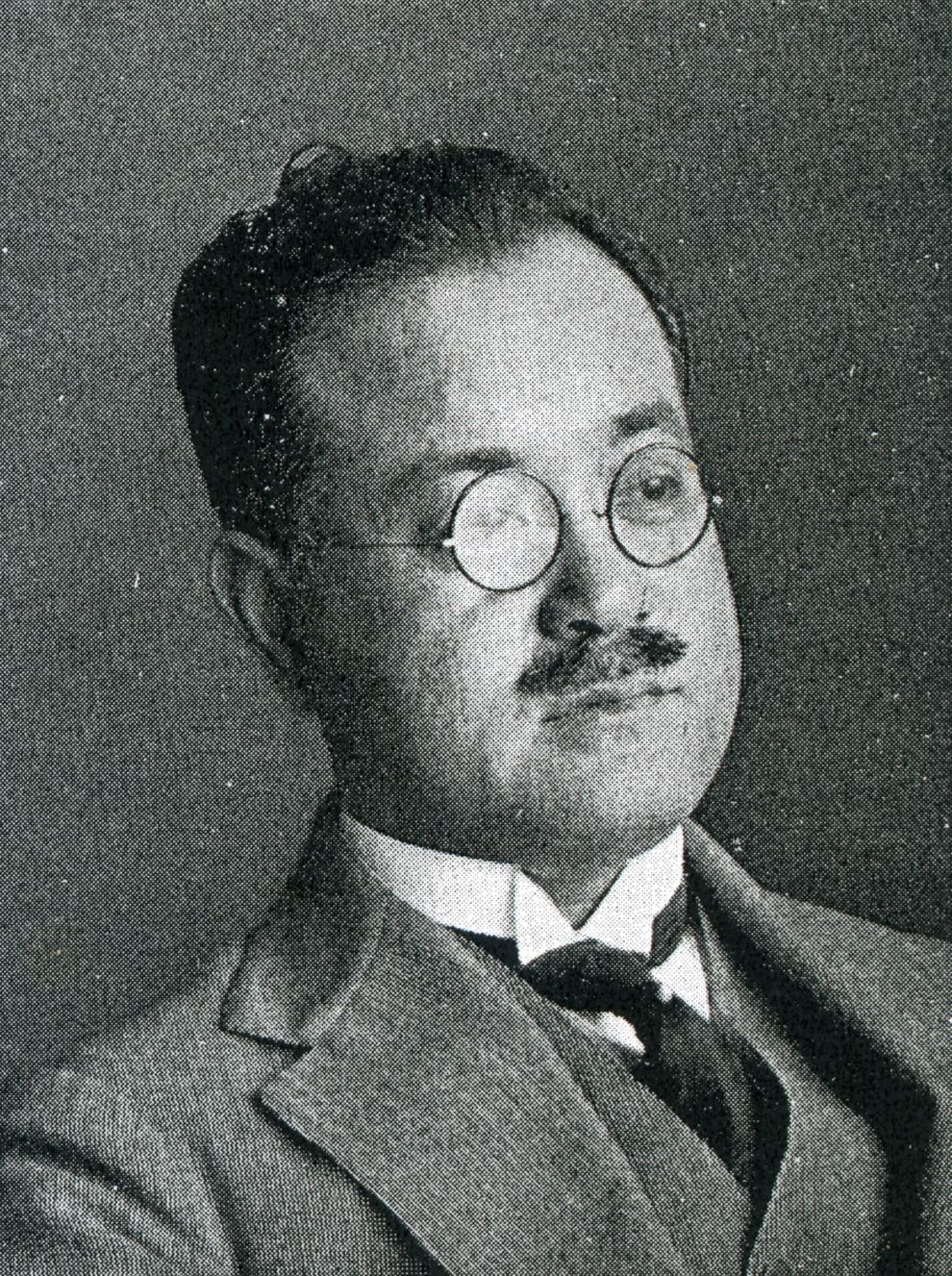
- Oda in 1929

Member of the House of Peers
- In office 26 July 1928 – 2 May 1947 Elected by the Viscounts

Personal details
- Born: Sōma Hidetane (相馬 秀胤); 3 August 1889 Tokyo, Japan
- Died: 20 May 1967 (aged 77) Setagaya, Tokyo, Japan
- Parent: Oda Nobutoshi (adoptive father)
- Education: Kyoto Imperial University

Viscount Nobutsune Oda (織田 信恒, Oda Nobutsune; 3 August 1889 – 20 May 1967) was a Japanese politician, businessman, and manga author, member of the House of Peers. Under the pen name Oda Shōsei (織田 小星), he wrote the original draft and text for the manga "Shō-chan no Bōken".

== Early life ==
He was born in Tokyo as Sōma Hidetane (相馬 秀胤), the eldest son of Viscount Soma Noritane, who was originally the lord of the Sōma Nakamura domain. His biological mother is Tomei. In June 1895 (Meiji 28), he became the adopted heir of Viscount Oda Nobutoshi, the former lord of the Tendō Domain. On 1 July 1901 (Meiji 34), he was succeeded to the peerage upon the death of his adoptive father Nobutoshi. After studying at Gakushuin High School (old system), he graduated from the Department of Political Science, Law School, Kyoto Imperial University in 1915 (Taishō 4) and entered the Bank of Japan. In 1920 (Taishō 9), he traveled to Europe, the United States and China to inspect commerce and industry, and was particularly influenced by the children's newspapers and magazines he saw while traveling in Europe.

== Career ==
After returning to Japan, he retired from the Bank of Japan and joined the Asahi Shimbun in 1922 (Taishō 11). He consulted with Sazanami Iwaya about publishing a children's newspaper, which he had been thinking about for a long time, and in 1923, he became a member of the Asahi Graph Bureau through Iwaya's introduction, being in charge of the children's page column of the "Nikkan Asahi Graph." So, he planned Shō-chan no Bōken, and he was in charge of the original story and writing himself. The comic strip serialization started with Katsuichi Kabashima as the illustrator. Shō-chan no Bōken was the first manga to use speech balloons, and the "Shō-chan hat" (knit cap) worn by the main character was very popular.

In the Taisho period, he participated in the Shinaikai sponsored by Yoriyasu Arima and Nagakage Oka, and was involved in the establishment of night schools for workers, such as Shinai Junior High School. He also participated in the eleventh gathering of up-and-coming peers run by Arima and Fumimaro Konoe. In 1926, he was appointed secretary to the Minister of Railways. On 26 July 1928, he was elected as a member of the House of Peers by-election. He belonged to Kenkyukai faction and served as a member of the House of Peers until its abolition on 2 May 1947. In the Hamaguchi Cabinet, he was appointed as Foreign Affairs Counselor, and in the Saitō Cabinet, he was appointed Parliamentary Vice-Minister of Agriculture and Forestry. In 1937 (Shōwa 12), he became chairman of the board of ammonium sulfate sales. He also served as president of Shizuoka Electric Railway and director of the NHK.

After the war, in 1947, he ran as an independent candidate for the 1st regular election for members of the House of Councilors, but was defeated. He has also served as a member of the Cabinet's (former) Tourism Business Council, director and auditor of Keikyu Corporation, and president of Keihin Automobile Industry. He also served as director of Kawasaki Saikaya and chairman of the Mineichirō Adachi Memorial Foundation. At 4:00 pm on 20 May 1967, he died of a myocardial infarction at his home in Daita, Setagaya-ku, Tokyo, at the age of 77. He received the Order of the Sacred Treasure, Second Class.
