= Tendō Domain =

Feudal domain in Edo-period Japan

Tendō Domain 天童藩
- under Tokugawa shogunate Japan
- 1830–1871
- Capital: Tendō jin'ya
  - Type: Daimyō
- Historical era: Edo period
  - Established: 1830
  - Disestablished: 1871
- Today part of: part of Yamagata Prefecture

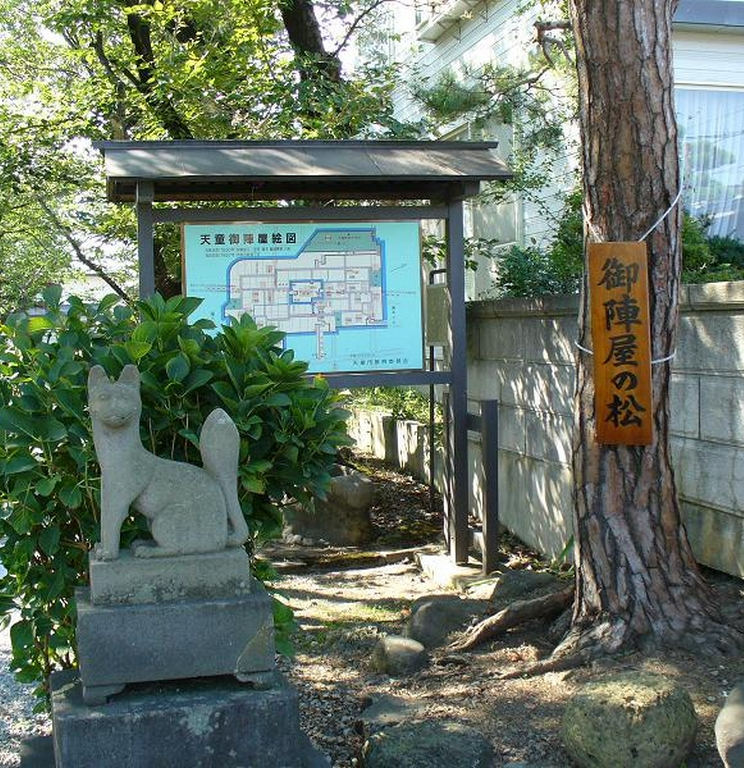
Site of Tendō jin'ya, administrative center of Tendō Domain

Tendō Domain (天童藩, Tendō-han) was a feudal domain in Edo period Japan, located in Dewa Province (modern-day Yamagata Prefecture), Japan. It was centered in what is now the city of Tendō, Yamagata. Tendō was ruled by the tozama Oda clan, direct descendants of the famed Oda Nobunaga, throughout its history. Although styled with the honorific of "castle", the clan residence was in fact a jin'ya, or fortified house.

== History ==
Tendō Castle was built in 1375 by Mogami Yorinao and entrusted to the Tendō clan. However, the Tendō sided against Mogami Yoshimitsu and were defeated over two generations, with Tendō Castle falling into ruins in 1584. During most of the Edo period, the area was tenryō territory under direct control of the Tokugawa shogunate.

In 1617, Oda Nobuyoshi, the fourth son of Oda Nobukatsu (who was the second son of Oda Nobunaga) was awarded the 20,000 koku Obata Domain in Kōzuke province, where the clan resided for seven generations to 1767. Due to the Meiwa Incident, the clan was transferred to Takabatake Domain, in Dewa Province. However, the Temmei Great Famine of 1782–1783 hit the region very hard, and reduced many of the peasants and even samurai of the domain to starvation. The domain went bankrupt, and the Oda were shifted to the smaller domain of Tendō in 1830.

Although Tendō also had nominal revenues of 20,000 koku, it consisted of 20 villages located in mountainous Murayama District of Dewa: an area with limited farming prospects, and thus its actual revenue was smaller. To make ends meet, the Tendō samurai were forced to raise and process safflower, used in the Edo period primarily as a pigment in foods and cosmetics.

The domain has a population of 13,393 people in 2551 households per the 1870 census. It maintained its primary residence (kamiyashiki) in Edo at Daimyō-kōji, in what is now Marunouchi, Tokyo. The domain also provided financial support for the famed ukiyo-e artist Hiroshige, who occasionally signed his works "Tendō Hiroshige".

During the Boshin War of the Meiji restoration, the forces loyal to shōgun Tokugawa Yoshinobu were defeated in the Battle of Ueno, and fled north. However, many representatives of the former shogunate peacefully surrendered Edo to the new Meiji government. The new government then ordered the daimyō of the northern domains to report and pledge their allegiance to the new government in early 1868. The samurai of Tendō domain were divided in their loyalties between the competing factions.

Oda Nobumichi declared himself too ill to travel, and sent his son Oda Nobutoshi in his place. Oda Nobutoshi and his senior retainer Yoshida Daihachi were ordered to act as guide and escort to the imperial army being sent to the Tōhoku region against the northern domains, especially centered on nearby Shōnai domain. Oda Nobutoshi participated in the attack on Shōnai, and in retaliation, Shōnai forces burned Tendō Jin'ya and castle town in April. The Tokugawa shogunate provided a relief fund of 5000 ryō to help with the rebuilding. With the formation of the Ouetsu Reppan Domei of northern domains against the new Meiji government, Tendō initially attempted to remain neutral, but joined the alliance in May 1868. Senior retainer Yoshida Daihachi committed seppuku over the defection. Following the defeat of the northern forces in the Boshin War, Nobutoshi was placed under house arrest, replaced as daimyō by his infant son Suemaru, and the domain revenues were decreased to 18,000 koku. Tendō domain was abolished with the Abolition of the han system in 1871. Oda Nobutoshi subsequently served as domain governor, and he and his descendants were subsequently awarded the kazoku peerage title of shishaku (viscount).

The tracks for the Yamagata Shinkansen run through the centre of the site of the Tendō jin'ya, of which nothing now remains. The Kitaro Inari Jinja (喜太郎稲荷神社), a Shinto shrine, is located where the main gate was once located.

== List of daimyōs ==
- Oda clan 1830–1871 (tozama)

	Name	Tenure	Courtesy title	Court Rank	kokudaka
1	Oda Nobukazu (織田 信美)	1830–1836	Mimasaka-no-kami (美濃守)	Lower 5th (従五位下)	20,000 koku
2	Oda Nobumichi (織田 信学)	1836–1868	Sakon’e-no-shōgen (左近将監)	Lower 5th (従五位下)	20,000 koku
3	Oda Nobutoshi (織田 信敏)	1868-1868	Echizen-no-kami (越前守)	Lower 5th (従五位下)	20,000 koku
4	Oda Suemaru (織田 寿重丸)	1868–1869	-none-	-none-	20,000 koku
5	Oda Nobutoshi (織田 信敏)	1869–1871	Hyōbu-daiyu(兵部大輔)	Lower 5th (従五位下)	20,000→18,000 koku
