= Oda Nobumi =

Japanese daimyō

Oda Nobumi (織田 信美; July 9, 1793 – August 4, 1836) was a tozama daimyō of the late Edo period in Japan. In 1828, he became the second member of the Oda clan to rule the Takahata Domain in Dewa Province, in northern Japan. He later built a new residence in Tendō Domain in the same province and became its first daimyō.

Oda Nobumi was a direct descendant of the famed Oda Nobunaga, through Nobunaga's son Oda Nobukatsu.

== Biography ==
Nobukazu was born as the ninth son of Oda Nobuchika and the daughter of Ogasawara Nagayuki. His childhood name was Hyaku-tarō. His wife was the third daughter of Ōmura Sumiyasu, daimyō of Ōmura Domain in Kyūshū, and his concubine was the fourth daughter of Toda Takanaka of Utsunomiya Domain. He had three sons and three daughters.

On November 1, 1811, he had an audience with the shōgun Tokugawa Ienari. In 1818, on the death of his father, he succeeded to the lordship of Takahata, and received the ceremonial court title of Wakasa-no-kami and lower 5th Court rank in 1820. In 1826, after the castle at Takahata had burned down for a second time, he was ordered by the bakufu to shift its location to Tendō, a largely undeveloped forested and mountainous region within the territory of the same domain, where he ruled as first lord of Tendō from 1830–1936. His ceremonial court title was changed to Echizen-no-kami. His grave is at the Buddhist temple of Korin-ji in Bunkyo-ku, Tokyo.

Oda Nobumi Oda clan Born: 1853 Died: 6 June 1901
Preceded by Oda Nobuchika	3rd Daimyō of Takabatake; 1818–1830	Succeeded by none
Preceded by none	1st Daimyō of Tendō; 1830–1836	Succeeded by Oda Nobumichi
Preceded by Oda Nobuchika	9th Oda family head (desc. from Nobukatsu); 1818–1836	Succeeded by Oda Nobumichi
