= Kuwana Castle =

Coordinates: 35°03′52.65″N 136°41′55.4″E

- 桑名城
- Kuwana, Mie Prefecture, Japan
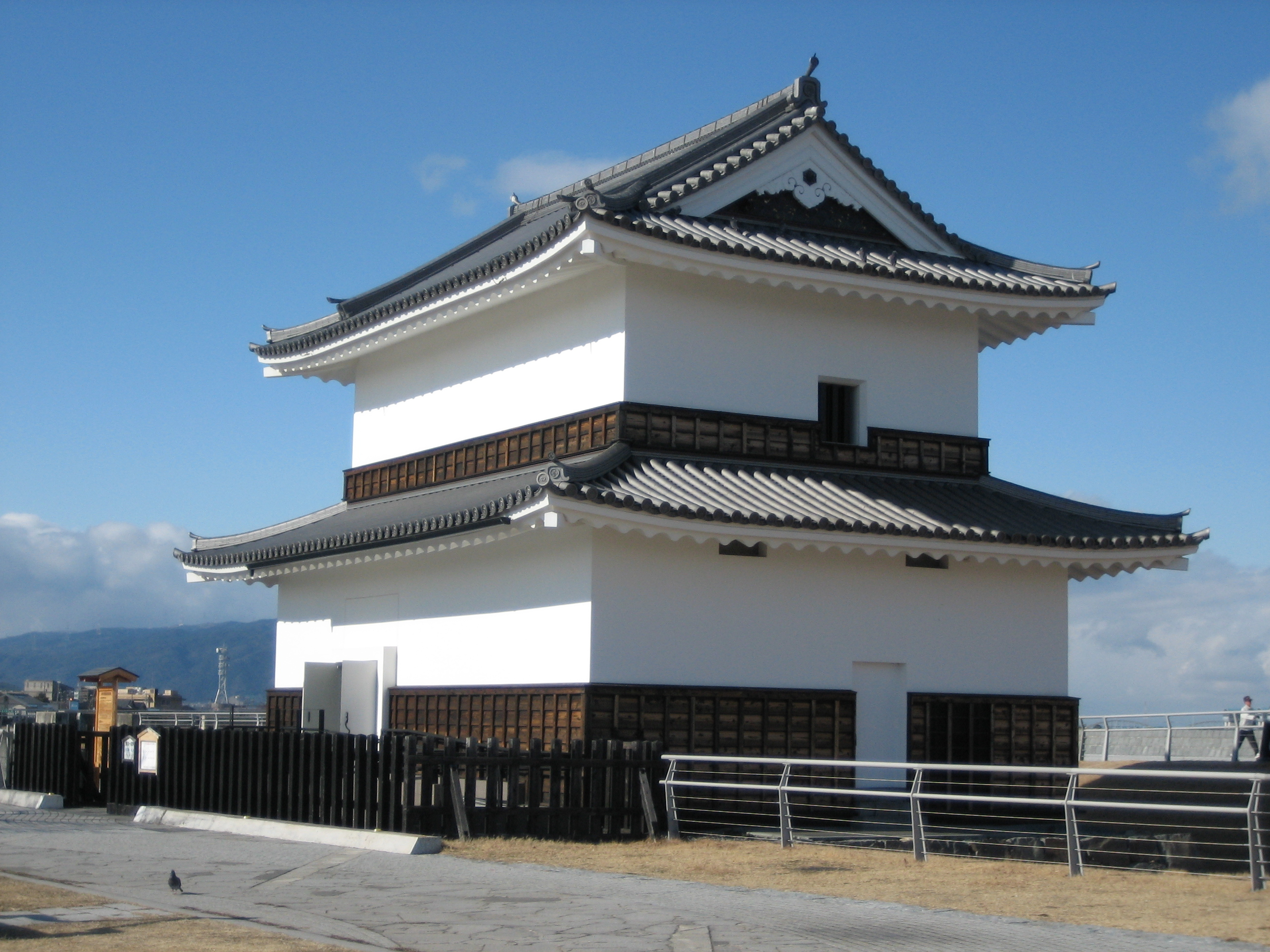
- Reconstructed Yagura of Kuwana Castle

Site information
- Type: flatland-style Japanese castle
- Open to the public: yes
- Condition: partially reconstructed

Location

Site history
- Built: 1601
- Built by: Honda Tadakatsu
- In use: Edo period
- Demolished: 1873

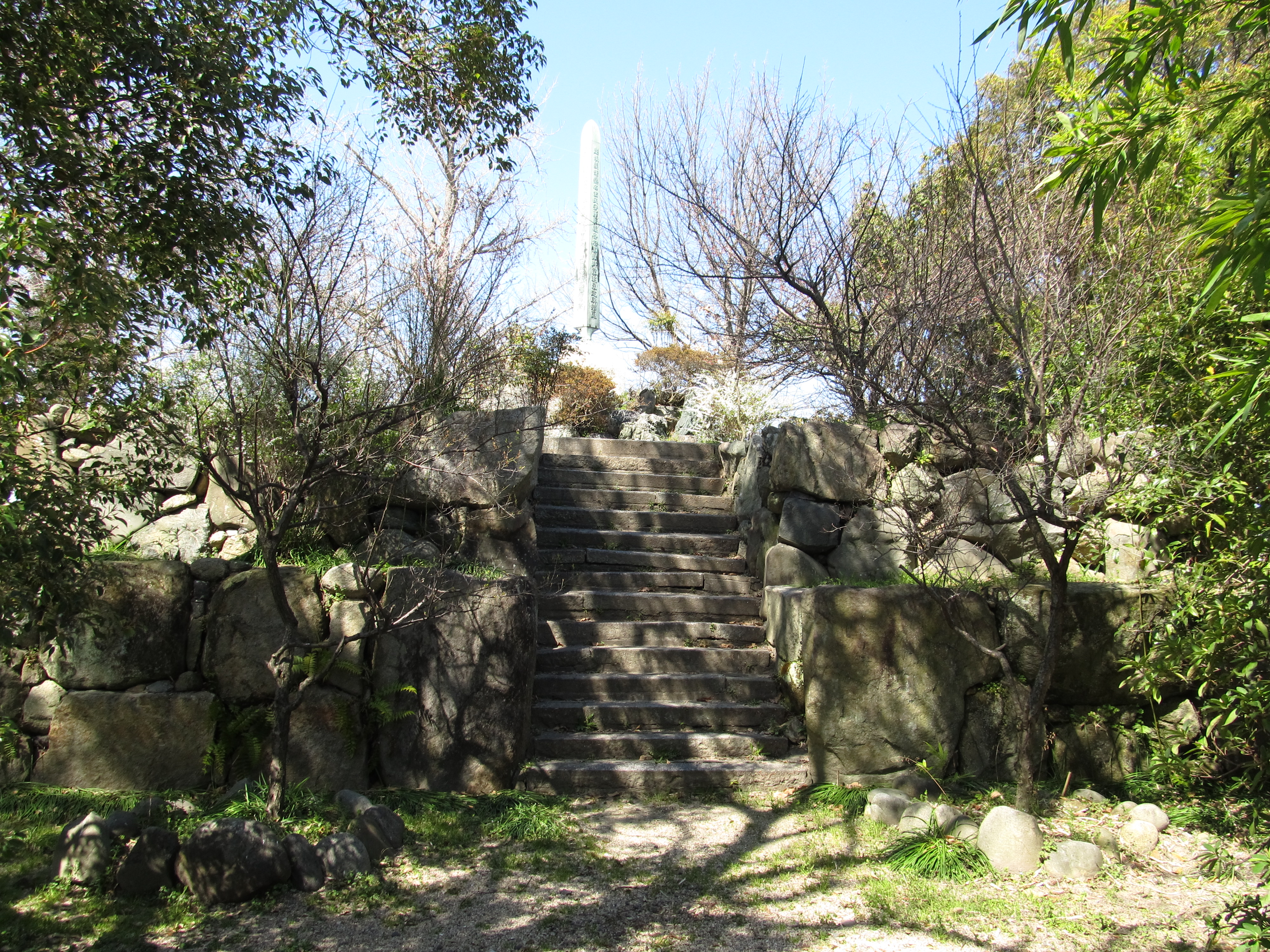
Foundations of the tenshu

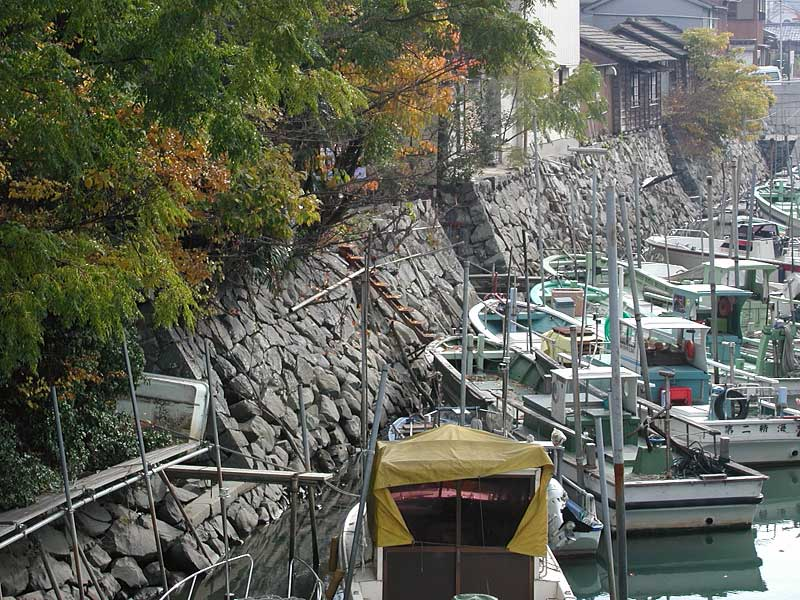
Seaward walls of Kuwana Castle

Kuwana Castle (桑名城, Kuwana-jō) is a Japanese castle located in Kuwana, northern Mie Prefecture, Japan. At the end of the Edo period, Kuwana Castle was home to a branch the Matsudaira clan, daimyō of Kuwana Domain. The castle was also known as "Ōgi-jō" (扇城) or "Asahi-jō" (旭城).

== Background ==
During the late Heian period and Muromachi period, the area of modern Kuwana was known as Jūraku-no-tsu (十楽の津) and was a major seaport on Ise Bay, controlled by a guild of merchants. The poet Socho described it in 1515 as a major city with over a thousand houses, temples and inns. The port was protected by three fortifications, (Higashi Castle, Nishi Castle, Misaki Castle) which made up what was known as the “Three Castles of Kuwana”. During the Sengoku period, the area came under the influence of the Ikkō-ikki movement centered at Nagashima. After the Ikkō-ikki were exterminated by Oda Nobunaga, the Kuwana area was awarded to his general Takigawa Kazumasa. After Nobunaga's death, Takigawa opposed Toyotomi Hideyoshi and lost his territories. For a time, Oda Nobukatsu held the area, but was dispossessed by Hideyoshi following the Battle of Odawara. In 1595, Hideyoshi assigned Ujiie Yukihiro a 22,000 koku domain, but he was dispossessed by Tokugawa Ieyasu after the Battle of Sekigahara. Tokugawa Ieyasu realized the strategic importance of Kuwana in the ongoing struggle against the Toyotomi clan in Osaka due to its location at the mouth of Nagara River on the western side of the Nagashima delta area formed by the Kiso River, Nagara River and Ibi River. This meant that any travelers on the vital Tōkaidō highway connecting Edo with Kyoto had to pass through Kuwana in order to take a boat from Kuwana port to Atsumi Peninsula in Owari Province, as there were no bridges.

Ieyasu reassigned Honda Tadakatsu from Otaki Castle in Kazusa Province to Kuwana and ordered him to construct a large fortification on the riverbank on what was roughly the site of the old Higashi Castle. Under the Honda, Kuwana-juku developed as a prosperous post town.

== Structure of Kuwana Castle ==
The castle Honda constructed was roughly triangular, protected on one side by the Kiso River. Within, the inner Bailey of the castle was rectangular, measuring 150 by 60 meters, and contained a four-roof, six-story tenshu and three three-story yagura watchtowers at each corner. Smaller secondary and tertiary enclosures surrounded the inner area forming a buffer zone for defense rather than a residential zone as in most other castles. The whole was surrounded by low stone walls and 24 two-story yagura, 12 one-story yagura and 46 gates. The western area of the castle, from which any attack was anticipated to come, was further protected by a water moat

== History ==
In 1616, the Honda were transferred to Himeji Domain, and Kuwana Domain came under the control of a cadet branch of the Matsudaira clan, who would rule Kuwana throughout the remainder of the Edo period. The castle burned down in a fire of 1701, which also destroyed most of the surrounding castle town. The Tokugawa shogunate did not grant permission for the tenshu to be rebuilt, and the rest of the castle was restored on a much smaller scale

During the Bakumatsu period, Kuwana was ruled by Matsudaira Sadaaki, key supporter of the Tokugawa clan in the Boshin War and younger brother of Matsudaira Katamori of Aizu Domain. However, in his absence while fighting the Satchō Alliance in northern Japan, the castle was surrendered to imperial forces without a battle. It was set on fire by troops of the Meiji government and after the Meiji Restoration, its stone walls were demolished to form part of the breakwater at Yokkaichi Port.

In 1928, the inner bailey and a portion of the Ni-no-Maru second bailey with some remnants of stone walls and moats were made into a public park, the Kyūka Park (九華公園, Kyūka-kōen) and the castle ruins became a Mie Prefectural Historical site in 1942. The current structures include two reconstructed yagura. The castle site is a 20-minute walk from Kuwana Station.

== Literature ==
- De Lange, William (2021). An Encyclopedia of Japanese Castles. Groningen: Toyo Press. pp. 600 pages. ISBN 978-9492722300.
- Schmorleitz, Morton S. (1974). Castles in Japan. Tokyo: Charles E. Tuttle Co. pp. 144–145. ISBN 0-8048-1102-4.
- Motoo, Hinago (1986). Japanese Castles. Tokyo: Kodansha. p. 200 pages. ISBN 0-87011-766-1.
- Mitchelhill, Jennifer (2004). Castles of the Samurai: Power and Beauty. Tokyo: Kodansha. p. 112 pages. ISBN 4-7700-2954-3.
- Turnbull, Stephen (2003). Japanese Castles 1540-1640. Osprey Publishing. p. 64 pages. ISBN 1-84176-429-9.
