= Shō-chan no Bōken =

Japanese manga series

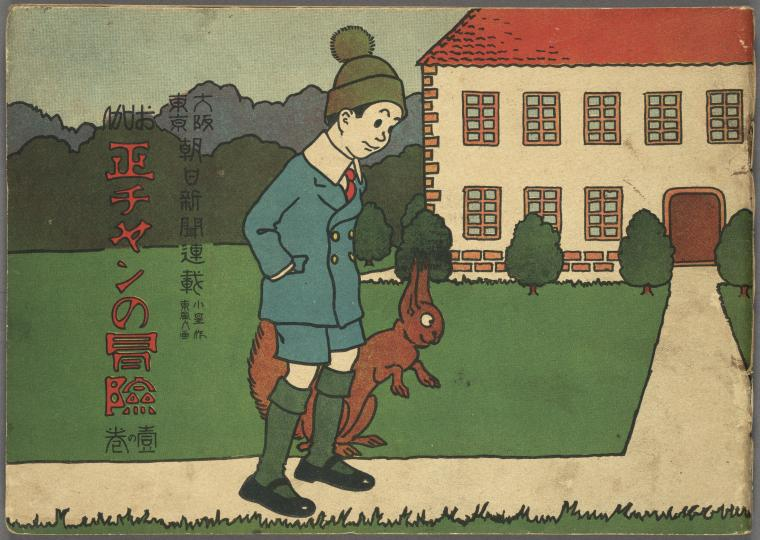
Shō-chan no Bōken cover, 1923.

Shō-chan no Bōken (正チャンの冒険, Shō-chan's Adventures) is a Japanese four-panel manga drawn by Katsuichi Kabashima (樺島 勝一, Kabashima Katsuichi, under the pseudonym 東風人, Tōfūjin) and written by Nobutsune Oda (織田 信恒, Oda Nobutsune, as 織田小星, Oda Shosei), serialized in Asahi Graph and Asahi Shimbun from 1923 to 1926 At first, the serialization was anonymous, but the authors' names were written in the March 1, 1924 edition. The comic depicted various adventurous journeys of the main character, a boy named Shō-chan and his sidekick squirrel Risu (リス), and was very popular among readers of the time for its fantastic stories, reminiscent of fairy tales and illustrations with a Western flair.

== Publication ==
The comic strip was first serialized in Asahi Graph from its first issue in January 1923 to the last issue at the end of August under the title of Sho-chan no bauken (正チヤンのばうけん)". After Asahi Graph ceased publication, it was serialized in the morning edition of Asahi Shimbun from October 20 of the same year. Although the picture story was discontinued on August 20, 1924, a serial story in the form of a novel, " Suzumushi" was published from August 21 to August 28. Serialization began again on October 5 and continued until October 31st of the following year. Furthermore, from February 12 to May 18, 1926, "Shō-chan no sonogo (正チヤンのその後, After Shō-chan)" was serialized. On the other hand, in the reissued "Asahi Graph", it was serialized from March 12 to August 27, 1924, under the title of "Suiyōbi no Sho-chan (水曜日の正ちやん, Wednesday's Shō-chan)".

Between 1924 and 1925, the Asahi Shimbun compiled the strips in seven volumes (horizontal format, 64 pages per volume, four-color printing). The date of first publication is as follows:

- Volume I - July 6, 1924
- Volume II - September 10, 1924
- Volume III - October 25, 1924
- Volume IV - January 10, 1925
- Volume V - March 20, 1925
- Volume VI - June 15, 1925
- Volume VII - October 15, 1925

There are also related works that differ from these monographs. In 1926, the Asahi Shimbun published a picture book (large vertical book, 60 pages, new text) titled "Shō-chan no Kogo" (正チヤンの其後). In addition to Shochan and Risu, "Donkichi" the acorn dwarf appeared in this book, and in the same year, "Shochan to Risu" was published by Kanao Bunʼendō, for which Kabashima did the cover and frontispiece, and the comic included in the book was illustrated by Shimizu Kimikichi. In 1951, Dainippon Yuben Kodansha published "Emonogatari Shochan no Boken" (絵ものがたり正ちゃんのぼうけん).

== Style and format ==
At the time of serialization, the story was in a four-panel installment each time, but since the "Asahi Graph" serialization, the story has been structured to continue over several episodes. For each panel, in addition to the picture, a vertical caption was attached to the outside of the panel, and speech balloons were used for the dialogues written inside the panel. This style is "intermediate between the earlier pictorial storytelling and modern manga".

== Background ==
The influence of Western cartoons for children on this work has been clarified by numerous testimonies from those involved. Bunshiro Suzuki, editor-in-chief of Asahi Graph, wrote that it was modeled after a comic strip serialized in the British newspaper Daily Mirror featuring a penguin. It has been speculated that the work may have been Pip, Squeak and Wilfred, by Bertram Lamb and A. B. Payne. He envisioned a series of story cartoons, changing the appearing penguins to squirrels and adding children. Oda, who was in charge of editing the entire Asahi Graph page for children, was in charge of the original work, and Kabashima, who was invited to the editorial staff of the Asahi Shimbun, was in charge of drawing.

Oda had traveled to Europe as an employee of the Bank of Japan before being involved in the editing of Asahi Graph, but after coming into contact with various children's stories there, he wanted to be involved in such a job. And after he returned to Japan, he consulted with Sazanami Iwaya, and with Iwaya's consent, he headed to the Asahi Shimbun to obtain cooperation, and began to work as an editor. On the other hand, Kabashima at that time was active mainly on covers, frontispieces and illustrations for magazines and textbooks. Although being not well known to the public, he was invited to Asahi Shimbun because some people appreciated his ability. His original pattern was a hard one like a copperplate engraving, but he shown a softer pattern in this work.

During the serialization, the main character began to wear a knit cap with a large pom-pom on his head, which was called ''Sho-chan cap'' and became popular among children.

A similarity between Sho-chan's artwork and themes and Hergé's The Adventures of Tintin (first published six years later, in 1929) has been pointed out; it is unclear if the former influenced the latter.
