= Kuwana Domain =

Feudal domain under the Tokugawa shogunate

Kuwana Domain 桑名藩
- Domain of Japan
- 1601–1871
- Flag
- Capital: Kuwana Castle
- Area
  - Coordinates: 35°03′52.65″N 136°41′55.4″E
- Government
  - Type: Daimyō
- Historical era: Edo period
  - Established: 1601
  - Disestablished: 1871
- Today part of: Mie Prefecture

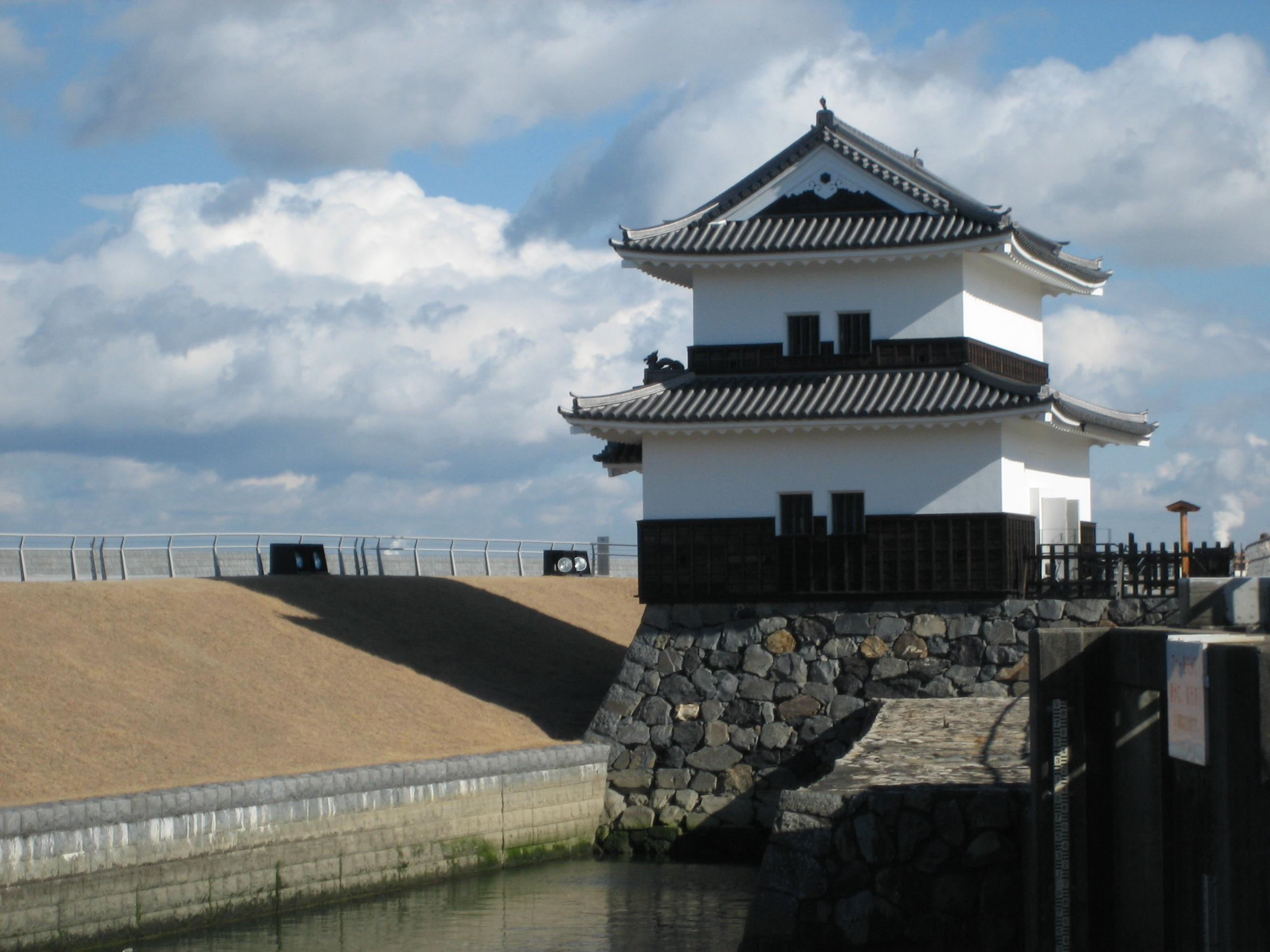
Reconstructed portion of Kuwana Castle

Kuwana Domain (桑名藩, Kuwana-han) was a Japanese feudal domain under the Tokugawa shogunate of Edo period Japan, located in Ise Province. It was centered on Kuwana Castle in what is now the city of Kuwana, Mie Prefecture. It was controlled by a fudai daimyō clans throughout its history.

== History ==
During the late Heian period and Muromachi period, the area of modern Kuwana was known as Juraku-no-tsu (十楽の津)and was a major seaport on the east coast of Japan, controlled by a guild of merchants. The poet Socho described it in 1515 as a major city with over a thousand houses, temples and inns. During the Sengoku period, the area came under the control of Oda Nobunaga, who assigned it to his retainer, Takigawa Kazumasu. After Nobunaga’s death, the area came under the control of Toyotomi Hideyoshi, who initially installed Nobunaga’s younger son Oda Nobukatsu as ruler as all of Ise Province. However, following the 1590 Battle of Odawara, Hideyoshi demoted Oda Nobukatsu, divided Ise Province into several domains, and assigned Hitotsuyanagi Naomori as ruler of Kuwana. In 1595, the area was reassigned to Ujiie Yukihiro as a 22,000 koku domain. Ujiie Yukihiro sided with the pro-Toyotomi armies in the Battle of Sekigahara and was dispossessed by Tokugawa Ieyasu.

In January 1601, one of Ieyasu’s main generals, Honda Tadakatsu was installed as daimyō of Kuwana Domain, with a kokudaka of 100,000 koku. The Tokugawa Shogunate recognized the strategic value of the location as both a seaport, and also as Kuwana-juku, a post station on the vital Tōkaidō highway connecting Edo with Kyoto. In 1609, Tadakatsu was succeeded by his son Honda Tadamasa, who distinguished himself at the Siege of Osaka and was rewarded with a transfer to the more lucrative Himeji Domain in 1617.

The strategic Kuwana Domain was then assigned to Ieyasu’s half-brother, Hisamatsu Sadakatsu, whose descendants ruled until they were transferred to Takada Domain in Echigo Province in 1710, and their place taken by the Okudaira branch of the Matsudaira clan, who ruled to 1823, when a branch of the Hisamatsu returned to Kuwana from Shirakawa Domain in Mutsu Province. The Hisamatsu continued to rule Kuwana until the end of the Tokugawa shogunate.

Matsudaira Sadaaki, the next-to-last daimyō of Kuwana served as the last Kyoto shoshidai and supported his brother, Matsudaira Katamori, daimyō of Aizu Domain. He fought in the Boshin War, finally surrendering to the Meiji government after the fall of the Republic of Ezo.The final daimyō of Kuwana, Matsudaira Sadanori, was still a child during the Boshin War. He capitulated Kuwana Castle to the Satchō Alliance forces without a battle. He was later educated in the United States and joined the Meiji government, serving as Japanese ambassador to Italy. He was later ennobled with the kazoku peerage title of shishaku (viscount).

With the abolition of the han system in July 1871, Kuwana Domain became “Kuwana Prefecture”, which later became part of Mie Prefecture.

== Territory ==
As with most domains in the han system, Nagashima Domain consisted of several discontinuous territories calculated to provide the assigned kokudaka, based on periodic cadastral surveys and projected agricultural yields. At the end of the Edo period, it consisted of numerous villages in Ise Province and also in Echigo Province:

Ise Province

- 64 villages in Kuwana District
- 83 villages in Inabe District
- 30 villages in Asake District
- 9 villages in Mie District

Echigo Province

- 4 villages in Koshi District
- 22 villages in Uonuma District
- 82 villages in Kariwa District
- 30 villages in Santō District
- 7 villages in Kanbara District

In addition to the above, Kuwana Domain also administered 212 villages within Echigo Province which were tenryō territory on behalf of the shogunate.

== List of daimyō ==
#	Name	Tenure	Courtesy title	Court Rank	kokudaka
Honda clan, 1601-1616 (fudai)
1	Honda Tadakatsu (本多忠勝)	1601-1609	Nakatsu-no-daisuke (中務大輔)	Junior 5th Rank, Lower Grade (従五位下)	100,000 koku
2	Honda Tadamasa (本多忠政)	1609 - 1616	Mino-no-kami (美濃守); Jijū (侍従)	Junior 4th Rank, Lower Grade (従四位下)	100,000 koku
Hisamatsu clan, 1616-1710 (shinpan)
1	Hisamatsu Sadakatsu (久松定勝)	1616 - 1624	Sakon-no-shōshō (左近衛権少将)	Junior 4th Rank, Lower Grade (従四位下)	110,000 koku
2	Hisamatsu Sadayuki (久松定行)	1624 - 1635	Oki-no-kami (隠岐守); Jijū (侍従)	Junior 5th Rank, Lower Grade (従五位下)	110,000 koku
3	Matsudaira Sadatsuna (松平定綱)	1635 - 1651	Etchū-no-kami (越中守)	Junior 4th Rank, Lower Grade (従四位下)	110,000 koku
4	Matsudaira Sadayoshi (松平定良)	1652 - 1657	Settsu-no-kami (摂津守)	Junior 5th Rank, Lower Grade (従五位下)	110,000 koku
5	Matsudaira Sadashige (松平定重)	1657 - 1710	Etchū-no-kami (越中守)	Junior 5th Rank, Lower Grade (従五位下)	110,000 koku
Okudaira clan, 1710-1823 (fudai)
1	Matsudaira Tadamasa (松平忠雅)	1710–1746	Sakon-no-shōshō (左近衛権少将)	Junior 4th Rank, Lower Grade (従四位下)	100,000 koku
2	Matsudaira Tadatoki (松平忠刻)	1746 - 1771	Shimōsa-no-kami (下総守)	Junior 4th Rank, Lower Grade (従四位下)	100,000 koku
3	Matsudaira Tadahira (松平忠啓)	1771 - 1786	Shimōsa-no-kami (下総守)	Junior 4th Rank, Lower Grade (従四位下)	100,000 koku
4	Matsudaira Tadakatsu (松平忠功)	1787 - 1793	Shimōsa-no-kami (下総守)	Junior 4th Rank, Lower Grade (従四位下)	100,000 koku
5	Matsudaira Tadatomo (松平忠和)	1793 - 1802	Shimōsa-no-kami (下総守)	Junior 4th Rank, Lower Grade (従四位下)	100,000 koku
6	Matsudaira Tadasuke (松平忠翼)	1802 - 1821	Shimōsa-no-kami (下総守); Jijū (侍従)	Junior 4th Rank, Lower Grade (従四位下)	100,000 koku
7	Matsudaira Tadataka (松平忠堯)	1821-1823	Shuri-Daiyu (修理大輔); Jijū (侍従)	Junior 4th Rank, Lower Grade (従四位下)	100,000 koku
Hisamatsu clan, 1823-1871 (shinpan)
1	Matsudaira Sadanaga (松平定永)	1823 - 1838	Shiki-daiyu (式部大輔)	Junior 4th Rank, Lower Grade (従四位下)	113,000 koku
2	Matsudaira Sadakazu (松平定和)	1838 - 1841	Sakon-no-shōshō (左近衛権少将)	Junior 4th Rank, Lower Grade (従四位下)	113,000 koku
3	Matsudaira Sadamichi (松平定猷)	1842 - 1858	Etchū-no-kami (越中守); Jijū (侍従)	Junior 4th Rank, Lower Grade (従四位下)	113,000 koku
4	Matsudaira Sadaaki (松平定敬)	1859 - 1868	Sakon-no-chūshō (左近衛権中将); Jijū (侍従)	Junior 4th Rank, Lower Grade (従四位下)	113,000 koku
5	Matsudaira Sadanori (松平定教)	1868 - 1871	-none-	4th, Lower Grade (正四位下)	113,000--> 60,000 koku

=== Simplified family tree ===
I.

- 1. Honda Tadakatsu, 1st Lord of Kuwana (1st creation, cr. 1601) (1548-1610; Lord: 1601, r. 1601-1609)
  - II. Honda Tadamasa, 2nd Lord of Kuwana (1st creation) (1575-1631; r. 1609-1616) - see below

2.

- O-dainokata (1528–1602). She married twice and had issue, including:
  - Tokugawa Ieyasu, 1st Tokugawa Shōgun (1543-1616; r. 1603-1605) (by O-dainokata's first husband Matsudaira Hirotada (1526–1549))
    - Matsudaira Nobuyasu (1559-1579)
      - Myokoin (1577-1626), m. II. Honda Tadamasa, 2nd Lord of Kuwana (1st creation) - see above
    - Kamehime (1560-1625), m. Okudaira Nobumasa, Lord of Kamo, Kyōto Shoshidai (1555-1615)
      - Matsudaira Tadaaki, Lord of Ise-Kameyama (1583-1644)
        - Matsudaira Tadahiro, Lord of Himeji (1631-1700)
          - Matsudaira Kiyoteru (1652-1686)
            - I. Matsudaira Tadamasa, 1st Lord of Kuwana (3rd creation, cr. 1710) (1683-1746; Lord: 1710, r. 1710-1746)
              - II. Matsudaira Tadatoki, 2nd Lord of Kuwana (3rd creation) (1718-1783; r. 1746-1771)
                - III. Matsudaira Tadahira, 3rd Lord of Kuwana (3rd creation) (1747-1787; r. 1771-1786)
              - Ii Naoari, 4th Lord of Yoita (1719-1760)
                - Ii Naoakira, 6th Lord of Yoita (1750-1820)
                  - VI. Matsudaira Tadasuke, 6th Lord of Kuwana (3rd creation) (1780-1821; r. 1802-1821)
                    - VII. Matsudaira Tadataka, 7th Lord of Kuwana (3rd creation) (1801-1864; r. 1821-1823)
    - Tokugawa Yorinobu, 1st Lord of Kishū (1602–1671)
      - Tokugawa Mitsusada, 2nd Lord of Kishū (1627-1705; r. 1667-1698)
        - Tokugawa Yoshimune, 5th Lord of Kishū, 8th Tokugawa Shōgun (1684-1751; Lord of Kishū: 1705-1716; Shōgun: 1716-1745)
          - Tokugawa Munetake, 1st head of the Tayasu-Tokugawa line (1716-1771)
            - Matsudaira Sadanobu, 3rd Lord of Shirakawa (1759-1829)
              - I. Matsudaira Sadanaga, 1st Lord of Kuwana (4th creation, cr. 1823) (1791-1838; Lord: 1823, r. 1823-1838)
                - II. Matsudaira Sadakazu, 2nd Lord of Kuwana (4th creation) (1812-1841; r. 1838-1841)
                  - III. Matsudaira Sadamichi, 3rd Lord of Kuwana (4th creation) (1834-1859; r. 1842-1859)
                    - V. Matsudaira Sadanori, 5th Lord of Kuwana (4th creation), 5th family head, 1st Viscount (1857-1899; Lord: 1868; Governor:1869-1871; family head:1868-1899; Viscount: cr.1884)
      - Matsudaira Yorizumi, 1st Lord of Saijō (1641-1711)
        - Tokugawa Munenao, 6th Lord of Kishū (1682–1757)
          - Tokugawa Munemasa, 7th Lord of Wakayama (1720-1765)
            - IV. Matsudaira Tadakatsu, 4th Lord of Kuwana (3rd creation) (1756-1830; r. 1787-1793)
            - V. Matsudaira Tadatomo, 5th Lord of Kuwana (3rd creation) (1759-1802; r. 1793-1802)
    - Tokugawa Yorifusa, 1st Lord of Mito (1603-1661)
      - Matsudaira Yorishige, 1st Lord of Takamatsu (1622-1695)
        - Matsudaira Yoritoshi (1661-1687)
          - Matsudaira Yoritoyo, 3rd Lord of Takamatsu (1680-1735)
            - Tokugawa Munetaka, 4th Lord of Mito (1705-1730)
              - Tokugawa Munemoto, 5th Lord of Mito (1728-1766)
                - Tokugawa Harumori, 6th Lord of Mito (1751-1805)
                  - Matsudaira Yoshiyori, 9th Lord of Takasu (1776-1832)
                    - Matsudaira Yoshitatsu, 10th Lord of Takasu (1800-1862)
                      - IV. Matsudaira Sadaaki, 4th Lord of Kuwana (4th creation) (1847-1908; r. 1859-1868)
                        - Matsudaira Sadaharu, 6th family head, 2nd Viscount (1885-1953; family head: 1899-1953; 2nd Viscount: 1899-1947)
                          - Matsudaira Sadaaki (1910-1945)
                            - Matsudaira Sadajun, 7th family head (b. 1940; family head: 1953-)
  - I. Hisamatsu Sadakatsu, 1st Lord of Kuwana (2nd creation, cr. 1616) (1560–1624; Lord: 1616; r. 1616-1624) (by O-dainokata's second husband Hisamatsu Toshikatsu (1526-1587)
    - II. Matsudaira Sadayuki, 2nd Lord of Kuwana (2nd creation) (1587-1668; r. 1624-1635)
      - Matsudaira Sadayori, 2nd Lord of Iyo-Matsuyama (1607-1662)
        - V. Matsudaira Sadashige, 5th Lord of Kuwana (2nd creation) (1644-1717; r. 1657-1710)
    - III. Matsudaira Sadatsuna, 3rd Lord of Kuwana (2nd creation) (1592-1652; r. 1635-1651)
      - IV. Matsudaira Sadayoshi, 4th Lord of Kuwana (2nd creation) (1632-1657; r. 1652-1657)
