= Oda Nobumichi =

- 織田 信学
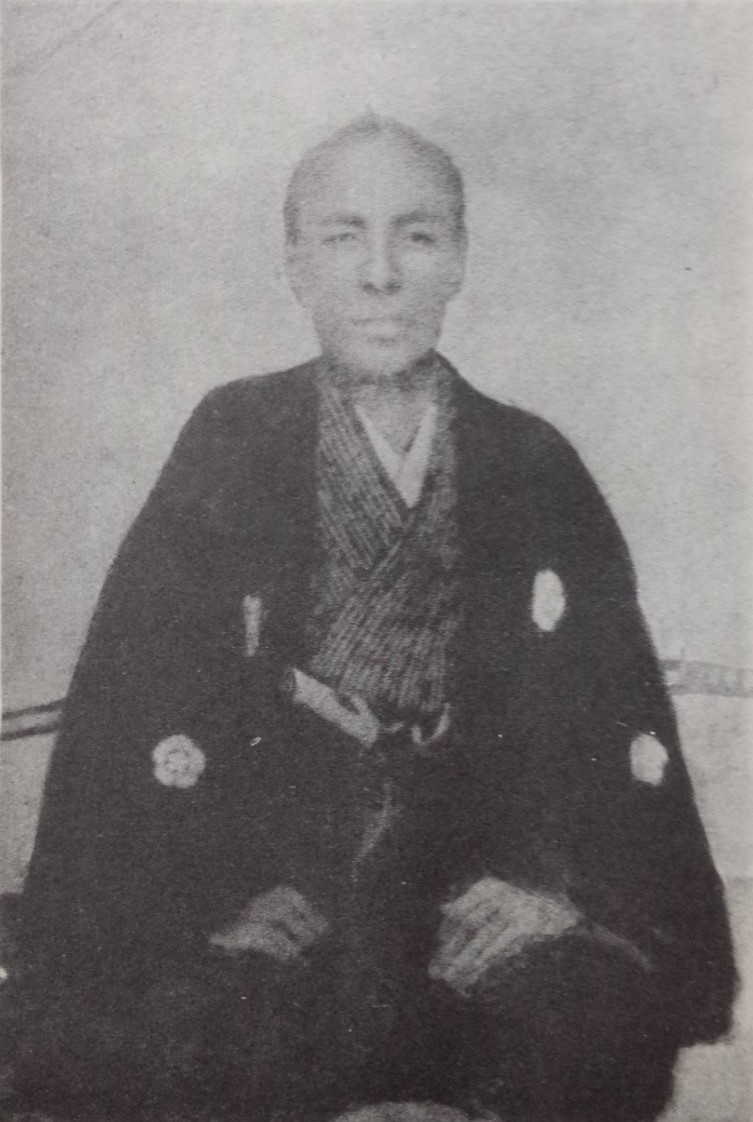
- Oda Nobumichi

2nd Daimyō of Tendō Domain
- Preceded by: Oda Nobumasa
- Succeeded by: Oda Nobutoshi

Personal details
- Born: 1819
- Died: 1891 (aged 71–72)

Oda Nobumichi (織田 信学, 1819–1891) was the second daimyō of Tendō Domain in Dewa Province during the late Edo period.

== Biography ==
Oda Nobumichi was born in 1819 as the son of Oda Nobumi (織田信美), of the Tendō branch of the Oda clan. The Tendō Oda were a cadet branch of the family of Oda Nobunaga and ruled a 20,000-koku domain centered in present-day Yamagata Prefecture.

He succeeded Oda Nobumasa as the second lord of Tendō Domain. The domain was administered from a jin'ya headquarters rather than a castle and formed part of the Tokugawa feudal structure as a tozama domain.

Nobumichi's tenure coincided with the political unrest of the Bakumatsu period. During the Boshin War (1868–1869), domains in Dewa Province were drawn into the conflict between the Tokugawa shogunate and imperial forces. Following the establishment of the Meiji government, the han system was abolished in 1871, and Tendō Domain was incorporated into Yamagata Prefecture.

Nobumichi died in 1891.

== Family ==
Nobumichi had six sons and nine daughters.

=== Parents ===
- Father: Oda Nobumi (織田信美)
- Mother: Asa (朝子), fourth daughter of Toda Tadazane (戸田忠翰)

=== Wives ===
- Principal wife: Daughter of Sōma Masutane (相馬益胤)
- Second wife: Itoko (糸子), daughter of Sōma Masutane

=== Children ===
- Oda Nobutoshi (織田信敏), fourth son and final daimyō of Tendō Domain
- Oda Toshishigemaru (織田寿重丸), sixth son

Regnal titles
Preceded by Oda Nobumasa	Daimyō of Tendō Domain; 1837–1868	Succeeded by Oda Nobutoshi
Preceded by Oda Nobumasa	10th head of the Oda clan (descended from Oda Nobukatsu); 1837–1868	Succeeded by Oda Nobutoshi
