= Satchō Alliance =

Military alliance formed to overthrow the Tokugawa shogunate of Japan (1866)

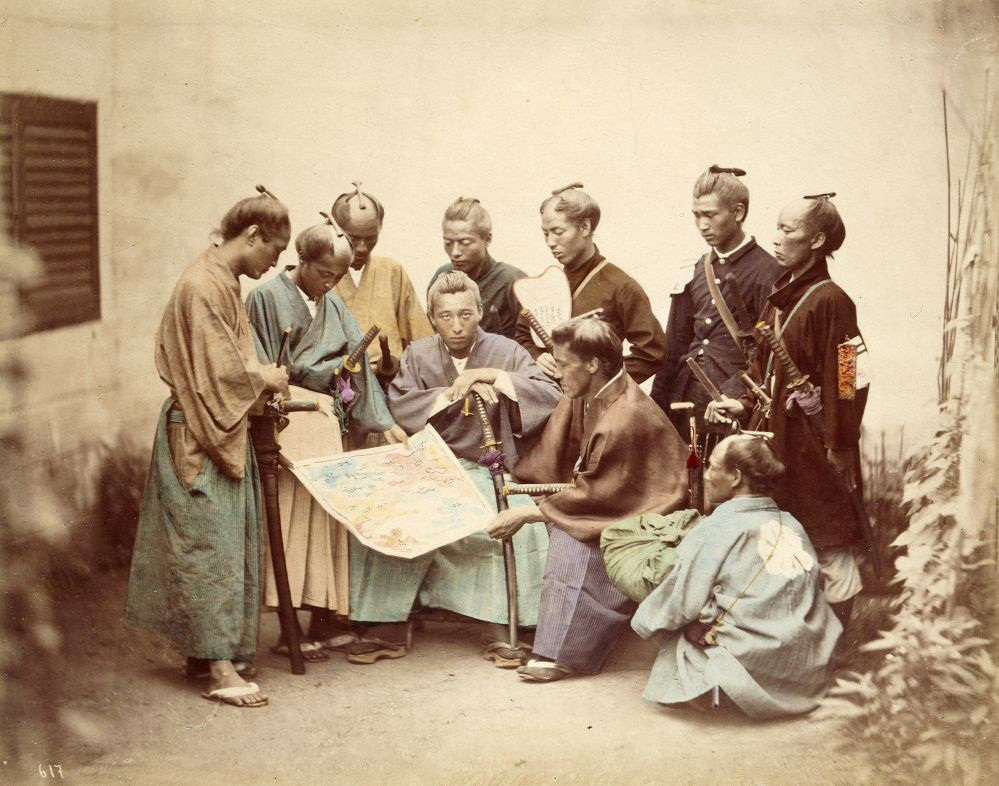
Samurai of the Satsuma clan, members of the Satchō Alliance, fighting for the Imperial side during the Boshin War period. Photograph by Felice Beato.

The Satsuma–Chōshū Alliance (薩摩長州同盟, Satsuma Chōshū dōmei), or Satchō Alliance (薩長同盟, Satchō dōmei) was a powerful military alliance between the southwestern feudal domains of Satsuma and Chōshū formed in 1866 to combine their efforts to restore Imperial rule and overthrow the Tokugawa shogunate of Japan.

== History ==
The name Satchō (薩長) is an abbreviation combining the names of the provinces Satsuma (present day Kagoshima Prefecture) and Chōshū (present-day Yamaguchi Prefecture), two of the strongest Imperialist tozama domains in Edo-period Japan.

In the 1860s, Satsuma tended to take a moderate position towards maintenance of the status quo, whereas Chōshū had become the center of an uprising aimed at overthrowing the government. Through the mediation of Nakaoka Shintarō, Satsuma military leaders Saigō Takamori and Ōkubo Toshimichi were brought together with Katsura Kogorō of Chōshū Domain. Although the two domains were traditionally fierce enemies, their leaders agreed that the time was right for a change, and agreed in principle to assist one another in the event that either would be attacked by a third party. Also, Chōshū desperately needed modern weapons, but had very limited contacts with the western powers. Satsuma, on the other hand, had developed a substantial arms trade with the United Kingdom via Thomas Glover, a Scottish merchant affiliated with Jardine Matheson. At the suggestion of Sakamoto, Saigo helped broker an agreement to supply Chōshū with the weapons it needed to fight the Tokugawa shogunate.

Despite this assistance, there was still considerable distrust between the two domains. On March 1, 1866, the Shogunate demanded the retirement and confinement of Chōshū daimyō Mōri Takachika and the reduction of domain revenues by 100,000 koku. This enraged the Chōshū leadership, and led to a formal, six-point agreement with Satsuma. The scope of the agreement was fairly limited. Satsuma agreed to assist Chōshū in obtaining a pardon from the Imperial Court. If this failed and the Shogunate attacked, Satsuma would send 2000 troops to Kyoto; however, Satsuma would engage the Shogunate in combat only if Kuwana, Aizu or shogun Tokugawa Yoshinobu's personal guard attempted to block Satsuma's access to the Emperor.

The Alliance was crucial in enabling Chōshū to withstand a punitive expedition mounted by the Tokugawa shogunate in the summer of 1866, which led to a stunning defeat for the Tokugawa armies. During the subsequent Boshin War of 1868–1869, the imperial armies which finally overthrew the Shogunate were primarily samurai from the Satchō alliance. With the establishment of the Meiji Restoration, men from these two domains dominated the new Meiji government into the 20th century.
