= Matsudaira Teru =

Japanese aristocrat

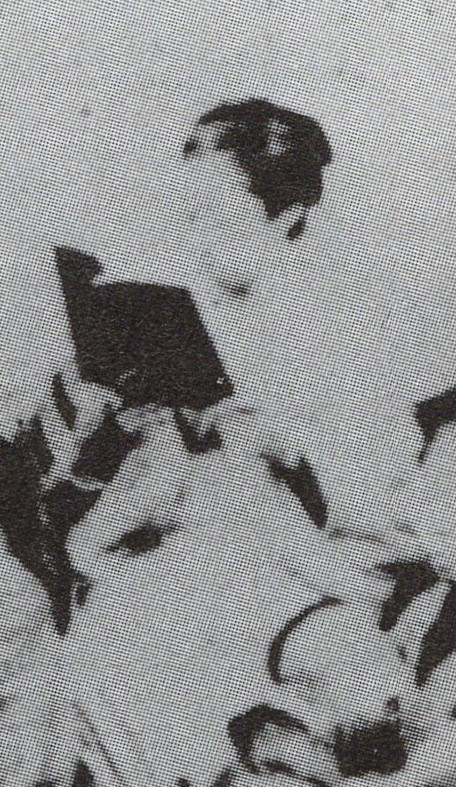

Matsudaira Teru (松平 照), or Teruhime (照姫, "Princess Teru"), (February 2, 1833 − February 28, 1884) was an aristocrat in Japan during the late Edo and early Meiji periods. She participated in the siege of Aizuwakamatsu Castle (Tsuruga Castle) and was the adoptive sister of Matsudaira Katamori, Military Commissioner of Kyoto and a prominent figure on the Tokugawa shogunate's side during the Meiji Restoration.

== Early life ==
Matsudaira Teru was born as the third daughter of Hoshina Masamoto, daimyō of the Iino han in Kazusa. Her name, written in authentic kanji is 熈 (Teru). In 1843, she was adopted by Matsudaira Katataka, daimyō of the Aizu han. The adoption took place because Katataka had no children; he had two sons and four daughters at that time, but all had died very young. Katataka took a liking to Teruhime during his frequent visits to the Iino family mansion in Edo. The two hans were closely related to each other, because the first daimyō of the Aizu han and the Iino han were adoptive brothers.

Teru was initially adopted to become the wife of the future heir of the Aizu han. However, Katataka's fifth daughter, Toshihime was born in 1843, and although physically weak, grew up, and took over this role. In 1846, she became the adoptive sister of Matsudaira Katamori, who was adopted by Katataka to marry Toshihime and become the heir of the Aizu han.

Teru's marriage was delayed for several years, because people feared Toshihime would die young. In 1849, Teru was finally given in marriage to Okudaira Masamoto, daimyō of the Nakatsu han. Teru and Masamoto divorced in 1854. Historians have speculated that the divorce may have been related to Masamoto's poor health (he died at a relatively young age) or the fact they did not have any children, but the true reason is unknown. She returned to live in the Aizu han mansion in Edo after the divorce.

== Aizu War and siege of Aizuwakamatsu Castle ==
In 1868, the Tokugawa shogunate army was defeated in the battle of Toba Fushimi and the new government subsequently stripped all powers from Matsudaira Katamori and the shōgun, Tokugawa Yoshinobu. Katamori advised Tokugawa Yoshinobu to fight, but instead received orders that he would be banned from Yoshinobu's castle and Edo. Katamori had no choice but to pull out from Edo and return to Aizuwakamatsu, the capital of the Aizu han. Teru also went to Aizu for her first time. After her arrival, she took the Buddhist tonsure and became a nun. Although Matsudaira Katamori followed the example of the shōgun Tokugawa Yoshinobu and put himself under house arrest, it soon became evident that the new government had no intentions of seeking a peaceful resolution. This eventually led to the Aizu War and the siege of Aizuwakamatsu Castle (Tsuruga Castle).

Women and children worked alongside men during the siege. Although Teru was a new face in the castle, she quickly became the leader of the over six hundred women and children involved in the siege, partly because Toshihime had died in 1861. The women and children mainly cooked meals, treated the injured, made bullets, and prevented fires when cannonballs were shot into the castle. Additionally, a group of women formed a volunteer infantry called the Aizu Jōshitai to protect Teru. The infantry was led by Nakano Takeko, who learned naginata from Akaoka Daisuke, who also taught Teruhime.

Suzuki Shingo was Teru's bodyguard during the siege. He had secret orders to assist her suicide if the castle was breached. On a particularly bad day, Shingo panicked under the extreme stress, drew his sword and urged Teru to commit suicide, although the battle was still undecided. He was quickly restrained by onlookers. Teru did not reprimand Shingo for this incident.

== After the Aizu War ==
When the Aizu han surrendered after a one-month siege, Teru was put under house arrest in the Myōkoku-ji temple with Katamori and Matsudaira Nobunori, Katamori's adoptive son. She was later put under custody of the Kishu han. The Iino han, her blood family, successfully campaigned to obtain her custody. She died in the Hoshina family mansion in Tokyo in 1884, at the age of 52, and received the posthumous Buddhist name Shōkei-in. She was first buried in the Jokakuji temple in Tokyo, but now rests in the Matsudaira family grave in the Aizu Matsudaira family's graveyard at Aizuwakamatsu City, only a few meters away from where her adoptive brother, Matsudaira Katamori lies.

== Poetry ==
Teru was skilled in waka poetry and calligraphy, and instructed Matsudaira Katamori in these arts. Her most famous poem was composed when Kayano Gonbei, fourth Karō in the Aizu han, was placed in the care of Hoshina Masaari of Iino han (Teruhime's birth brother), and was made to commit seppuku to take responsibility for the Aizu han's role in the Aizu War, in place of Katamori and Nobunori.

The poem in its entirety was as follows:

夢うつつ 思ひも分ず 惜しむぞよ まことある名は 世に残れども

Ah, regret! Unheeding of emotion, it is even present in dreams! But true distinction, will remain in the world.

The poem was sent to Gonbei with a letter and two pieces of silver. The handwritten letter and poem has been designated as a cultural property by the city of Aizuwakamatsu.

== Miscellaneous information ==
- Teruhime has occasionally been portrayed as the true love of Matsudaira Katamori in fictitious historical stories.
- Items used by Teruhime are on display at the Byakkotai Museum in the Tsuruga Castle.
