= Hoshina Masaari =

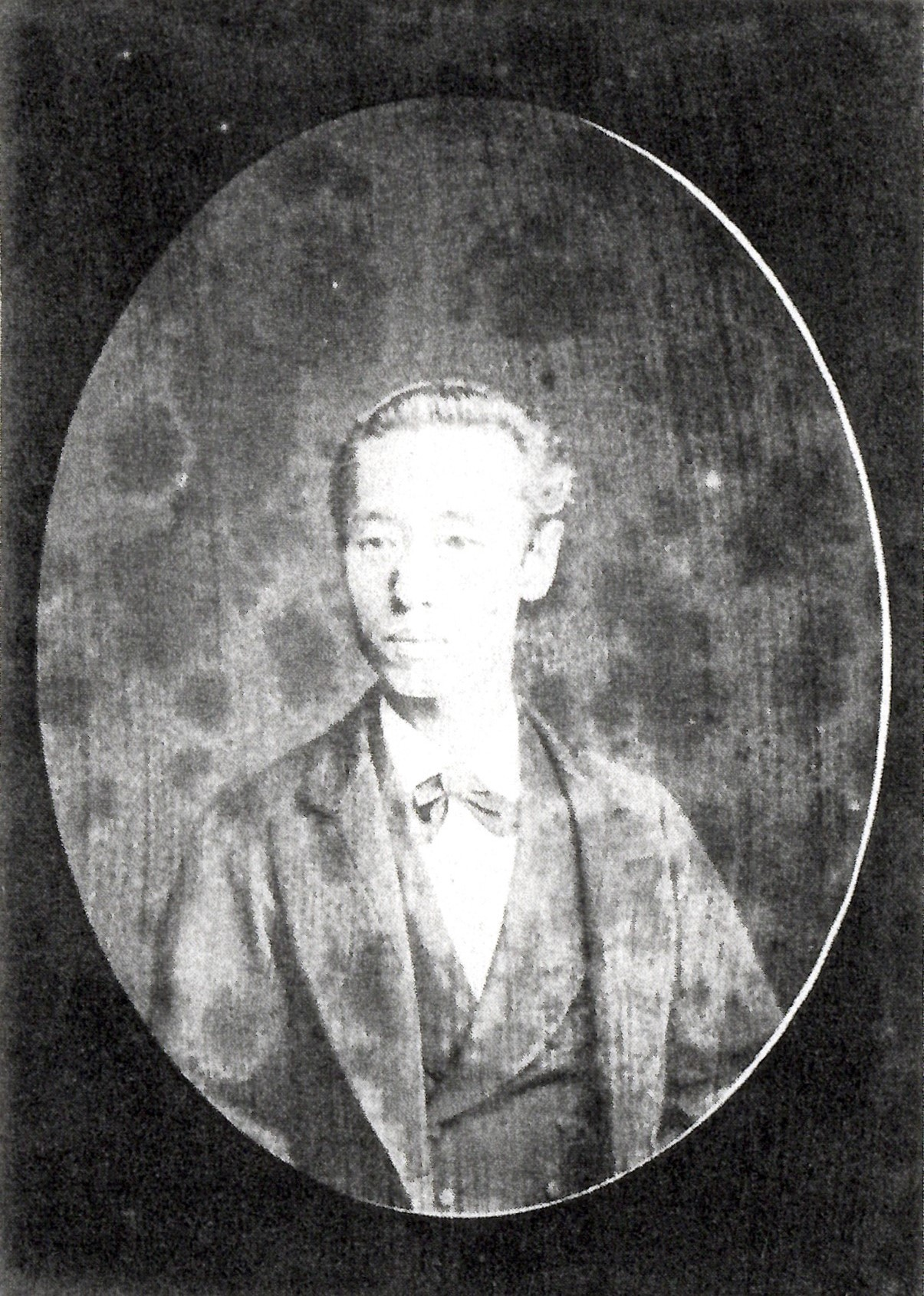

10th (Hoshina) Daimyō of Iino
- In office 1848–1871
- Preceded by: Hoshina Masamoto
- Succeeded by: none

Wakadoshiyori
- In office 1866–1867

Personal details
- Born: March 22, 1833 Edo, Japan
- Died: January 23, 1888 (aged 54)
- Spouse: Date Setsuko

Viscount Hoshina Masaari (保科 正益) (March 22, 1833 – January 23, 1888) was a Japanese daimyō of the late Edo period who was the last ruler of the Iino Domain (Kazusa Province; 20,000 koku). Though lord of a minor domain, his family was a branch of the Matsudaira of Aizu, whose founder Hoshina Masayuki was the older brother of the Iino founder, Hoshina Masasada.

Masaari was born in Edo to the 9th Iino lord, Hoshina Masamoto. Masaari was the younger brother of Matsudaira Teru. As he was initially weak, his father did not notify the shogunate of his birth. However, as Masamoto's first and second sons died in quick succession, he notified the shogunate of Masaari's birth in 1836; this is why Masaari's birthdate is given in some sources as 1836. He was made heir in 1847, and succeeded to family headship after his father's death in 1848. He received his family's hereditary title of Danjō no chū in 1850. In 1853, Masaari led Iino troops and took part in the defense of Uraga upon the arrival of Commodore Matthew C. Perry and the U.S. Navy's East India Squadron.

As lord of Iino, he held a variety of minor posts in the Tokugawa administration, most notably becoming a wakadoshiyori in the 2nd year of Keiō. He was also the chief commander of the multi-han military force active in the Chōshū Expedition, leading forces on the Iwami front.

After the Boshin War he was ordered by the new government to investigate those who were "responsible" for the war, and it was as part of this action that former Aizu karo Kayano Gonbei was executed in Masaari's residence at Azabu, in 1869.

As with many other former daimyo, Masaari became a member of the kazoku as a viscount (shishaku) in the Meiji era. He had several children; the eldest son Hoshina Masaaki was his successor; one daughter, Shizuko, married Iwasaki Hisaya, the younger brother of Mitsubishi founder Iwasaki Yatarō.

| Preceded by Hoshina Masamoto | 10th (Hoshina) Daimyō of Iino; 1848–1871 | Succeeded by none |
