= Kayano =

Kayano (written: 茅野 or 萱野, lit. "miscanthus weed field") is a Japanese surname. Notable people with the surname include:

- Ai Kayano (茅野 愛衣, born 1987), Japanese voice actress
- Kayano Gonbei (萱野 権兵衛, 1830 – 1869), Japanese Samurai
- Shigeru Kayano (萱野 茂, 1926 – 2006), last native speaker of the Ainu language

== Fictional characters ==
- Kaede Kayano (茅野 カエデ), one of the main characters in the manga/anime series Assassination Classroom
