= Kibungo–Ngoma Genocide Memorial =

Genocide memorial in Kibungo, Rwanda

Coordinates: 2.1648°S 30.5417°E

- Interactive map of Kibungo–Ngoma Genocide Memorial
- Location: Kibungo, Ngoma District, Eastern Province, Rwanda
- Type: Genocide memorial

The Kibungo–Ngoma Genocide Memorial is a memorial site dedicated to the victims of the 1994 genocide against the Tutsi in Rwanda, located in Kibungo, in Ngoma District, within the Eastern Province of Rwanda.

It contains mass graves where Tutsi victims killed in 1994 in the town of Kibungo and in several sectors of Ngoma District are buried. More than 25,000 victims were buried at the site as of 2025.

== Location ==
=== Geographic location ===
The Kibungo–Ngoma Genocide Memorial is located in the Kibungo sector, the administrative centre of Ngoma District, in the Eastern Province, east of Kigali, Rwanda.

The site is situated near the urban centre of Kibungo, at an altitude of approximately 1,600 metres, in an area that also contains other places of remembrance and several administrative institutions.

=== Historical context ===

Some memorials of the 1994 Genocide against the Tutsi in Rwanda.

Communes of Rwanda in 1994

Truck used to transport victims' remains, August 2025

Plaque at the entrance to the memorial, August 2025

During the 1994 genocide, the former Kibungo Prefecture was the scene of large-scale massacres targeting Tutsi in numerous parishes and rural sectors. Research by the Commission for the Memorial of the Genocide and Massacres in Rwanda estimated that more than 227,000 people were killed throughout the prefecture in 1994.

The Kibungo–Ngoma Memorial is among the sites officially identified and recorded by the National Commission for the Fight against Genocide as locations of massacres that subsequently became collective burial sites for victims.

== History ==
Following the end of the genocide, local and national authorities, working with survivors, searched for mass graves, exhumed bodies and transferred them to dignified burial sites in the Kibungo region. A memorial site was gradually developed in Kibungo to gather the remains of victims killed in the town and in surrounding sectors of Ngoma District.

In May 2016, survivors, local officials and representatives of survivors' associations attended a ceremony for the burial of human remains exhumed from various sectors of the district. The remains of more than 7,000 genocide victims were buried at the Kibungo memorial following several years of recovery and identification work.

During the Kwibuka 31 commemoration held in May 2025, Ibuka and the Ministry of National Unity and Civic Engagement (MINUBUMWE) stated that more than 25,000 genocide victims were buried at the Kibungo–Ngoma Genocide Memorial, including many people from families that were entirely exterminated in Ngoma District. The commemoration formed part of a national programme dedicated to families in which no member survived.

In April 2025, additional remains of victims were discovered in the Remera and Kibungo sectors. Eight bodies identified as those of people killed during the genocide were transferred to and buried at the memorial during a commemorative ceremony attended by local authorities and survivors.

Mass grave area, August 2025

== Features ==
The Kibungo–Ngoma Genocide Memorial includes mass graves containing the remains of victims, areas for remembrance and reflection, and an esplanade used for annual commemorative ceremonies during the Kwibuka period. Representatives of Ibuka, Ngoma District authorities and national institutions use the site for commemorative events focusing on transmitting the memory of the genocide to younger generations and combating genocide denial.

The site forms part of the network of memorial sites dedicated to the genocide against the Tutsi in Rwanda. It receives visits from survivors, school pupils, university students and official delegations as part of educational and remembrance programmes associated with the Ministry of National Unity and Civic Engagement.

== Related articles ==
- Rwandan genocide
- Genocide memorials in Rwanda
- Kibungo
- Ngoma District
- Eastern Province, Rwanda
