= Masakage =

- Gender: Male

Origin
- Origin: Japanese
- Meaning: Different meanings depending on the kanji used

Masakage (written: 政景, 正景 or 昌景) is a masculine Japanese given name. Notable people with the name include:

- Hoshina Masakage (保科 正景; 1616–1700), Japanese daimyō
- Nagao Masakage (長尾 政景; 1526–1564), Japanese samurai
- Rusu Masakage (留守 政景; 1549–1607), Japanese samurai
- Yamagata Masakage (山県 昌景; 1524–1575), Japanese samurai
