= Teijirō =

- Gender: Male

Origin
- Origin: Japanese
- Meaning: Different meanings depending on the kanji used

Teijirō, Teijiro or Teijirou (written: 貞次郎, 禎次郎 or 悌次郎) is a masculine Japanese given name. Notable people with the name include:

- Akizuki Teijirō (秋月 悌次郎; 1824–1900), Japanese samurai and educator
- Teijiro Tanikawa (谷川 禎次郎; 1932–2025), Japanese swimmer
- Teijirō Toyoda (豊田 貞次郎; 1885–1961), Japanese admiral and politician
