= Hisa Nagano =

Japanese nurse

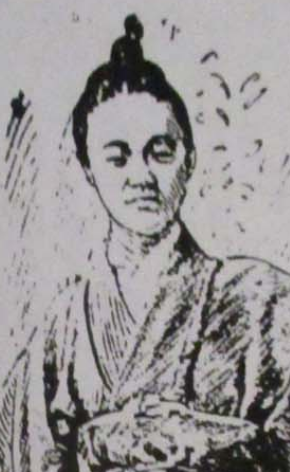
- Hisa Nagano, from a Canadian newspaper in 1897.
- Born: 1865
- Died: April 8, 1901 (aged 35–36); Kyoto
- Occupation: Nurse

Hisa Nagano (1865 – April 8, 1901) was a Japanese nurse and medical student in Chicago.

== Early life ==
Nagano was a student at the Doshisha Girls' School in Kyoto. In 1892, Nagano and another woman, Natsu Sakaki, went to Chicago under the care of American temperance activists, to study at the Clara Barton Training School for Nurses. They both graduated in 1893. Sakaki returned to Japan in 1895.

== Career ==
Nagano became head nurse at Chicago Baptist Hospital, a temperance hospital, after completing her training. "She is so happy, so deft, winsome, faithful, and full of cheery courage that we all love her," explained the hospital's superintendent in 1897.

After a brief return to Japan in 1898, she decided to live in Chicago and study medicine. She enrolled in the College of Physicians and Surgeons, and worked as a nurse in the city while pursuing her medical training. She also translated a Japanese novel, Morning Glory.

== Personal life ==
Nagano enjoyed Chicago's theatre offerings and restaurants. Concerned for the effects of overwork and a harsh winter climate, the Japanese consul in Chicago Toshiro Fujita helped Nagano return to Japan to recover her health. Instead, she died from tuberculosis in Kyoto in 1901, aged 36 years.
