= Hoshina Masasada =

Japanese daimyō

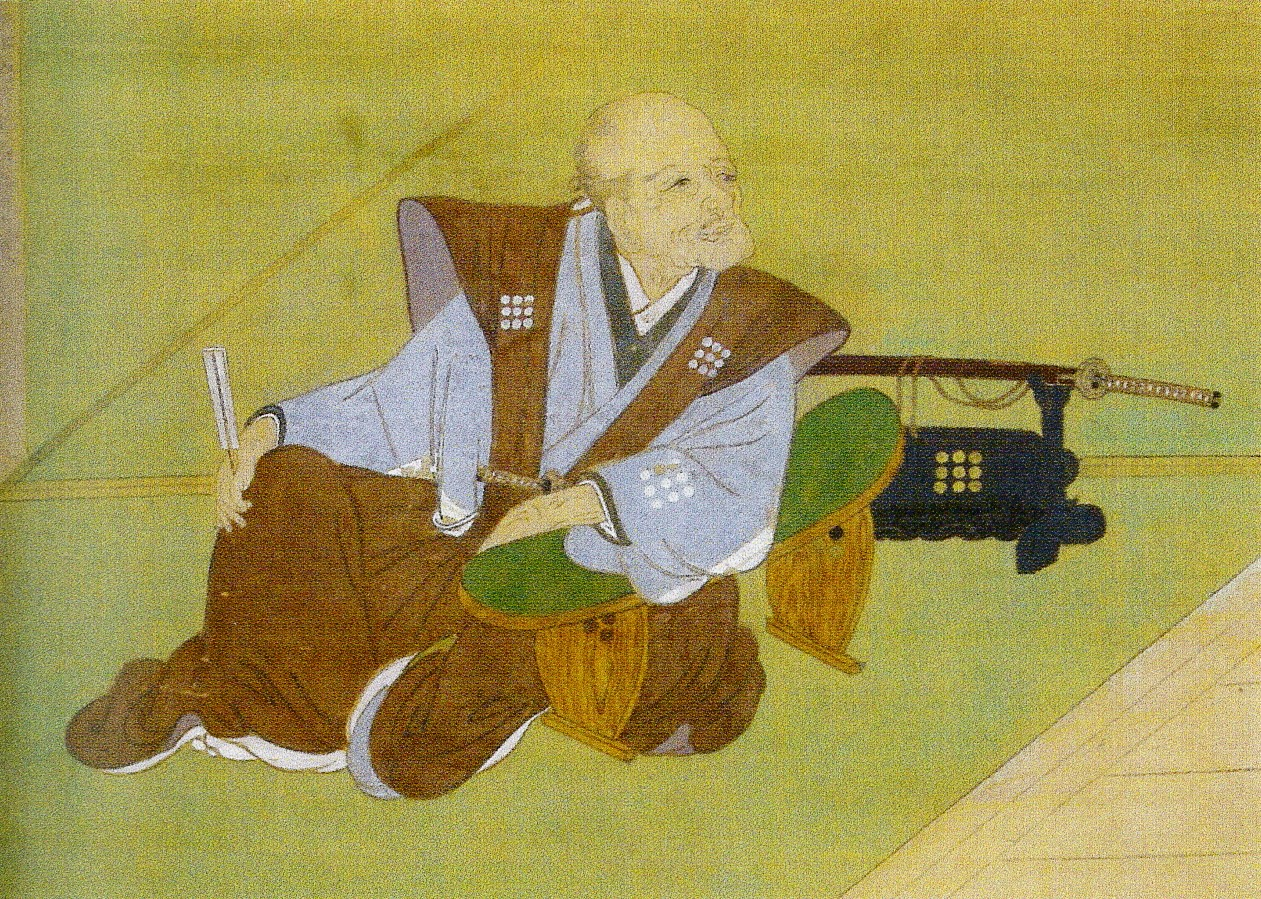
Hoshina Masasada

Hoshina Masasada (保科 正貞) (June 14, 1588 – December 22, 1661) was a Japanese daimyō of the Edo period, who ruled the Iino Domain. He was first a senior hatamoto with a 3000 koku income, before he was made lord of Iino.

Preceded by none	1st (Hoshina) Daimyō of Iino; 1648–1661	Succeeded by Hoshina Masakage
