= Doshisha Women's College of Liberal Arts =

Private women's college in Kyoto, Japan

- 同志社女子大学
- Emblem
- Other names: Dojo (同女, Dōjo)
- Motto: Latin: Ego sum vitis vera
- Motto in English: I am the true vine
- Type: Private
- Established: Founded 1876; Chartered 1949
- President: Kiyoshi Kawasaki
- Faculty: 836
- Administrative staff: 251
- Students: 6,538
- Undergraduates: 6,466
- Postgraduates: 52
- Location: Kyoto, Kyoto, Japan; 35°01′47″N 135°45′49″E
- Campus: Urban/suburban, 530 acres (210 ha)
- Colors: White & purple
- Website: www.dwc.doshisha.ac.jp/english/

Doshisha Women's College of Liberal Arts (同志社女子大学, Dōshisha joshi daigaku) is a private women's college in Kyotanabe, Kyoto, Japan. The predecessor of the school was founded in 1876, and it was chartered as a university in 1949.

== History ==
In 1875, Protestant educator Niijima Jō (Joseph Hardy Neesima) founded Doshisha Eigakko (Doshisha English School: the present Doshisha University) as a boys' school, receiving a helping hand from the American Board of Commissioners for Foreign Missions.

The following year, Niijima Jō's wife, Niijima Yae, and the American missionary Alice J. Starkweather opened a Joshi-juku (small girls' school) at the former residence of Yanagiwara family (a division of Fujiwara clan) on a site within the grounds of the current Kyoto Gyoen National Garden (Kyoto Imperial Garden). In 1877, it was renamed to Doshisha Bunko Nyokoba (Doshisha Branch School for Girls) and Niijima Jō became the principal. The school was soon renamed to Doshisha Jogakko (Doshisha Girls' School), and in 1878 it was moved to the current Imadegawa campus with the first self-owned school building built with financial aid from the Women's Board of Missions for the Pacific. American-trained nurse Hisa Nagano was an alumna of Doshisha Girls' School.

In 1930, while Matsuda Michi was dean, the girls' school became Doshisha Joshi Senmon Gakko (Doshisha Women's College), a three-year tertiary institution under the Senmon Gakko Rei (Professional School Ordinance).

After World War II, it became Doshisha Joshi Daigaku (Doshisha Women's College of Liberal Arts), and was chartered as a four-year higher education institution in 1949. The first graduate program started in 1967. A new campus, the Kyotanabe Campus, was opened in 1986, about 30 km to the south of the Imadegawa campus.

== Faculties, departments and graduate schools ==
- Faculties and departments (undergraduate levels)
  - Faculty of Liberal Arts
    - Department of Music (Music Performance / Theoretical Studies in Music)
    - Department of Information and Media
    - Department of International Studies
  - Faculty of Contemporary Social Studies
    - Department of Social Systems Studies
    - Department of Childhood Studies
  - Faculty of Pharmaceutical Sciences
    - Department of Clinical Pharmacy
  - Faculty of Nursing
    - Department of Nursing
  - Faculty of Culture and Representation
    - Department of English
    - Department of Japanese Language and Literature
  - Faculty of Human Life and Science
    - Department of Human Life Studies
    - Department of Food Science and Nutrition (Food Science / Nutrition and Dietetics)
- Graduate schools
  - Literary Studies
    - English (M.A. and Ph.D. degrees)
    - Japanese Studies (M.A. and Ph.D. degrees)
    - Information and Culture Studies (M.A. degree)
  - International Social Systems Studies
    - International Social Systems Studies (M.A. degree)
  - Pharmaceutical Sciences
    - Clinical Pharmaceutical Sciences (Ph.D. degree)
  - Human Life and Science
    - Life Style Design Studies (M.A. degree)
    - Food and Nutrition Studies (M.S. degree)
- As of 2013, Doshisha Women's College of Liberal Arts employs 278 full-time and 553 part-time faculty members across its Kyoto campuses.

== Campuses ==
Doshisha Women's College of Liberal Arts

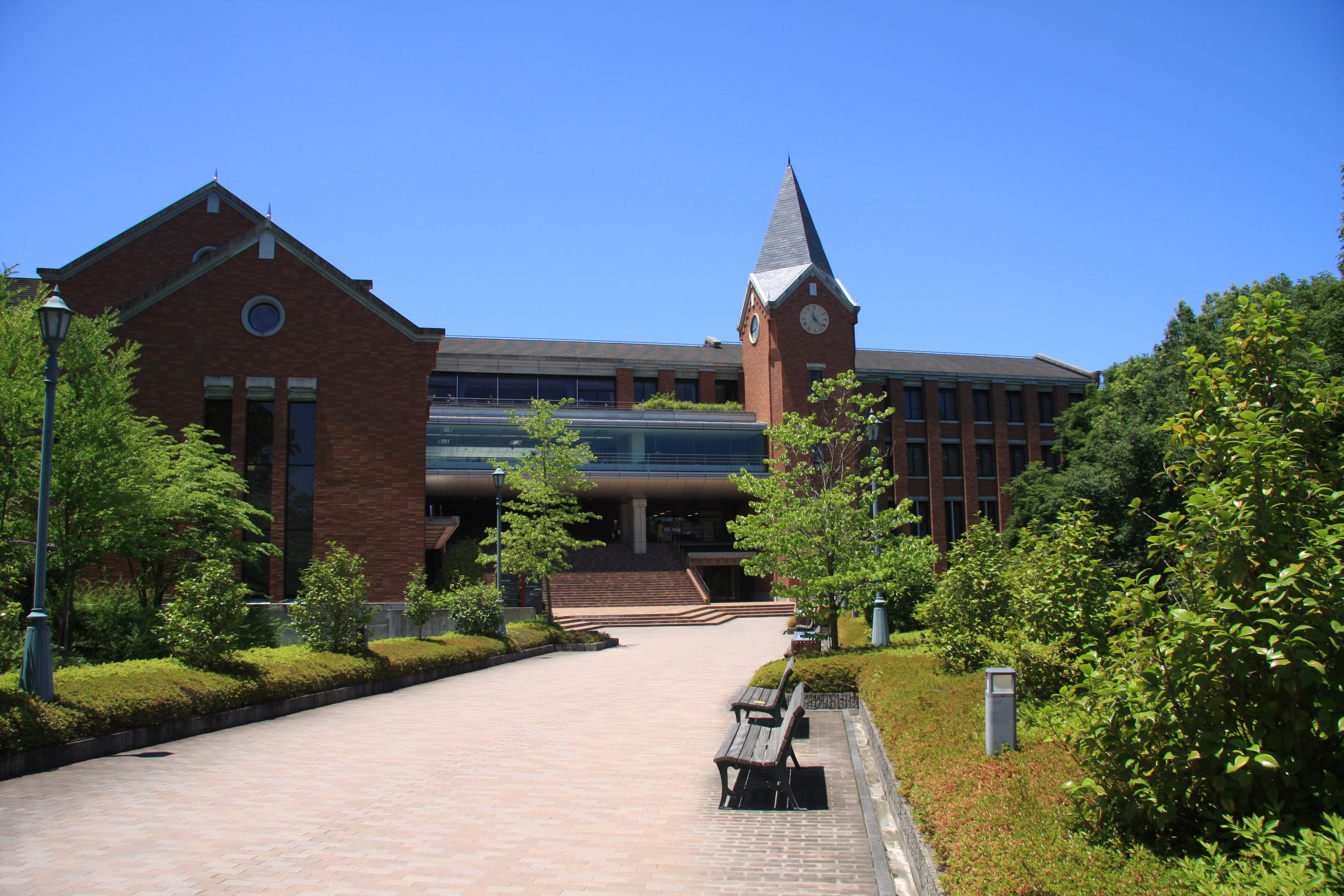
Yuwakan, Kyotanabe campus

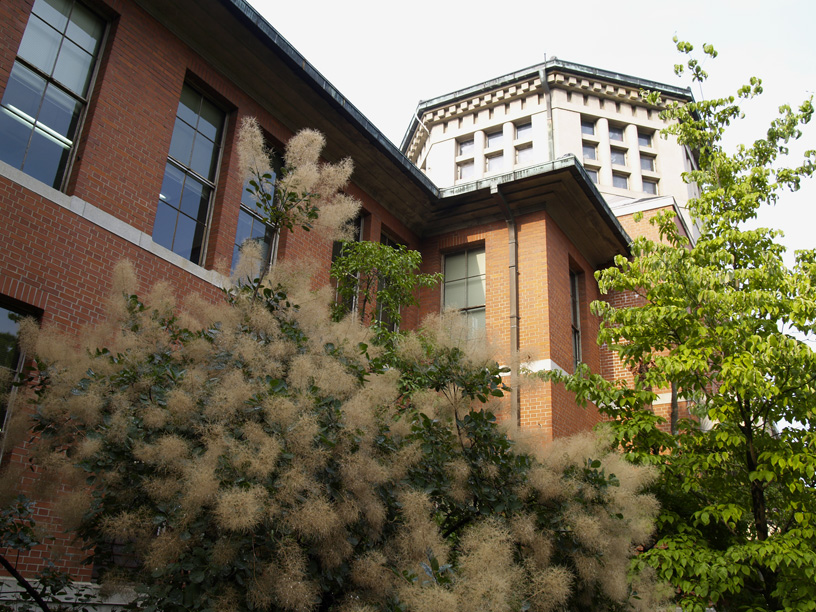
Eikoukan, Imadegawa campus

=== Kyoto ===
Doshisha Women's College has two campuses at Kyotanabe in southern Kyoto and at Imadegawa in central Kyoto. Kyoto, Japan's ancient capital from the beginning of Heian period to the end of the Edo period, has a 1,200-year history and attracts tourists from around the world. Traditional culture and arts such as the tea ceremony and flower arrangement have developed and have been preserved particularly in Kyoto. The city has hundreds of Buddhist temples and Shinto shrines, including some designated as World Heritage Sites, where many festivals such as the Aoi Matsuri, Gion Matsuri and Jidai Matsuri are held throughout the year. At the same time, Kyoto is a highly modern city, home to many of Japan's leading high-tech industries and a thriving international community.

=== Kyotanabe campus ===
The Kyotanabe campus is located in Kyōtanabe, Kyoto. It was opened in 1986 as Tanabe campus, part of the Kansai Science City and was renamed in 1999. The campus is located to the east across from the Kyotanabe campus of Doshisha University. It now houses 4 faculties (Faculties of Liberal Arts, Contemporary Social Studies, Pharmaceutical Sciences and Nursing ) and 3 graduate schools.

=== Imadegawa campus ===
The Imadegawa campus is located in the former residences of Nijō family and Fushimi-no-miya, situated in the center of Kyoto City, across from Kyoto Imperial Palace. It is located adjacent to the Imadegawa campus of Doshisha University. Inside the campus, the two buildings James-kan (built in 1913) and Eiko-kan (built in 1932) are registered as Tangible Cultural Properties of Japan. This campus houses 2 faculties (Faculties of Culture and Representation and Human Life and Science) and 2 graduate schools.

== Student life ==
=== Festivals ===
- Doshisha Eve - Held to coincide with and commemorate the Doshisha's Foundation Day, the occasion of "Doshisha Eve", the college festival, offers a variety of lectures, concerts, performances, exhibitions, and outdoor booths. This festival is held for three days prior to November 29, the founding date of Doshisha, at the Imadegawa campus.
- Shakespeare Eve - An especially unique event is "Shakespeare Eve", held annually in November on the Imadegawa campus. Fourth-year students from the Department of English independently produce, promote, and perform a Shakespearean play.

=== Club activities ===
There are a total of 53 official clubs and circles as extracurricular activities (as of Apr. 1, 2015). These clubs are classified into four categories: Religious Club, Cultural Club, Sports Club, and Circle.

- Religious Club: Joyous Bells, Choir etc. (4 clubs)
- Cultural Club: Announce Club, Cinema Club, Kado (Ikebana) Club, Kimono Club, Mandolin Club, and Sado (Japanese Tea Ceremony) Club etc. (25 clubs)
- Sports Club: Archery Club, Basketball Club, Dance Club, Flamenco Club, Canoe (Kayak) Club, Tennis Club, and Kyūdō Club etc. (21 clubs)
- Circle: Sports fan, and Messiah Choir etc. (3 circles)

== Employment opportunities ==
As of 2012, around 11.6% of undergraduates were able to find employment in one of the top 400 companies in Japan, which places Doshisha Women's College third overall among women's universities in the west part of Japan, after Nara Women's University and Kobe College.

== International programs ==
"Internationalism" is one of the main college policies, and Doshisha Women's College has a Division of International Affairs to offer students more than 40 international programs in addition to classroom studies and to encourage students to be more interested in international studies. The International programs are categorized into four areas: Outbound, Inbound, English Study Support and After-graduation.

- Outbound programs include Summer/Spring Short Study Abroad, Teaching Japanese to Foreign Students, One-semester English Language Study Abroad, One year/semester Study Abroad.
- Inbound programs include Japanese Studies Program, Japanese Language Immersion Course and one year/semester Visiting Students.
- English Study Support Programs include English Chatroom, English Speaking & Writing Support, TOEFL/English Camps, Extra Curricular English Classes and English Study Support Room.
- After-graduation Programs include transfer to Amherst College and admission to a graduate school of a US university, based on Doshisha Women's College's recommendation.

Doshisha Women's College was designated by Kyoto as one of the "Kyoto Global Universities" on October 31, 2016, and will receive a grant from the city from 2016 to 2019 to enrich the international programs especially inbound programs.

== List of partner universities and colleges ==
United States (19 institutions)

- Bemidji State University (Bemidji, Minnesota)
- Castleton University (Castleton, Vermont)
- Chatham University (Pittsburgh, Pennsylvania)
- Emporia State University (Emporia, Kansas)
- Mary Baldwin University (Staunton, Virginia)
- Millikin University (Decatur, Illinois)
- New England College (Henniker, New Hampshire)
- Oregon State University (Corvallis, Oregon)
- Smith College (Northampton, Massachusetts)
- Sweet Briar College (Sweet Briar, Virginia)
- University of Arkansas, Fort Smith (Fort Smith, Arkansas)
- University of California, Irvine (Irvine, California)
- University of California, Riverside (Riverside, California)
- University of Massachusetts Amherst (Amherst, Massachusetts)
- University of Nebraska at Kearney (Kearney, Nebraska)
- University of Oregon (Eugene, Oregon)
- University of Southern California (Los Angeles, California)
- Youngstown State University (Youngstown, Ohio)

Canada (12 institutions)

- Acadia University (Wolfville, Nova Scotia)
- Algoma University (Sault Ste. Marie, Ontario)
- Mount Allison University (Sackville, New Brunswick)
- Saint Mary's University (Halifax), Nova Scotia)
- St. Thomas University (Fredericton, New Brunswick)
- Trent University (Peterborough, Ontario)
- University of Alberta (Edmonton, Alberta)
- University of Guelph (Guelph, Ontario)
- University of Manitoba (Winnipeg, Manitoba)
- University of Victoria (Victoria, British Columbia)
- University of Winnipeg (Winnipeg, Manitoba)
- Vancouver Island University (Nanaimo, British Columbia)

United Kingdom (11 institutions)

- Lancaster University (Lancaster, England)
- Newcastle University (Newcastle upon Tyne, England)
- Oxford Brookes University (Oxford, England)
- Queen's University Belfast (Belfast, Northern Ireland)
- Royal Holloway, University of London (Surrey, England)
- University of Bradford (Bradford, England)
- University of East Anglia (Norwich, England)
- University of Essex (Colchester, England)
- University of Exeter (Exeter, England)
- University of Leeds (Leeds, England)
- University of Warwick (Coventry, England)

Australia (6 Institutions)

- Deakin University (Melbourne, Geelong & Warrnambool, Victoria)
- Griffith University (Brisbane & Gold Coast, Queensland)
- Southern Cross University (Gold Coast, Coffs Harbour & Lismore, Queensland)
- University of Melbourne (Melbourne, Victoria)
- University of New South Wales (Sydney, New South Wales))
- University of Wollongong (Wollongong, New South Wales)

New Zealand (1 institution)

- Victoria University of Wellington (Wellington)

Germany (2 institutions)

- Hochschule Düsseldorf (Düsseldorf)
- Universität des Saarlandes (Saarlandes)

China (2 institutions)

- Peking University (Beijing)
- Xi'an Jiaotong University (Xi'an, Shaanxi)

Taiwan [the Republic of China] (6 institutions)

- Chinese Culture University (Taipei)
- Fu Jen Catholic University (New Taipei)
- National Kaohsiung University of Science and Technology (Kaohsiung)
- National University of Kaohsiung (Kaohsiung)
- Providence University (Taichung)
- Soochow University (Taipei)

Korea (2 institution)

- Seoul Women's University (Seoul)
- Sungshin Women's University (Seoul)

Philippines (3 institutions)

- Ateneo de Manila University (Quezon)
- De La Salle University (Manila)
- University of the Philippines Diliman (Quezon)

Vietnam (2 institutions)

- Foreign Trade University (Hanoi)
- VNU University of Languages and International Studies (Hanoi)

Thailand (2 institution)

- Chulalongkorn University (Bangkok)
- Thammasat University (Bangkok)

Malaysia (1 institution)

- University of Malaya (Kuala Lumpur)

== See also ==
- Doshisha Women's Junior College
- Kansai Science City
- Michi Matsuda
- Esther Lowell Hibbard
