= Iino Domain =

Iino Domain 飯野藩
- under Tokugawa shogunate Japan
- 1648–1871
- Capital: Iino jin'ya
  - Type: Daimyō
- Historical era: Edo period
  - Established: 1648
  - Disestablished: 1871
- Today part of: part of Chiba Prefecture

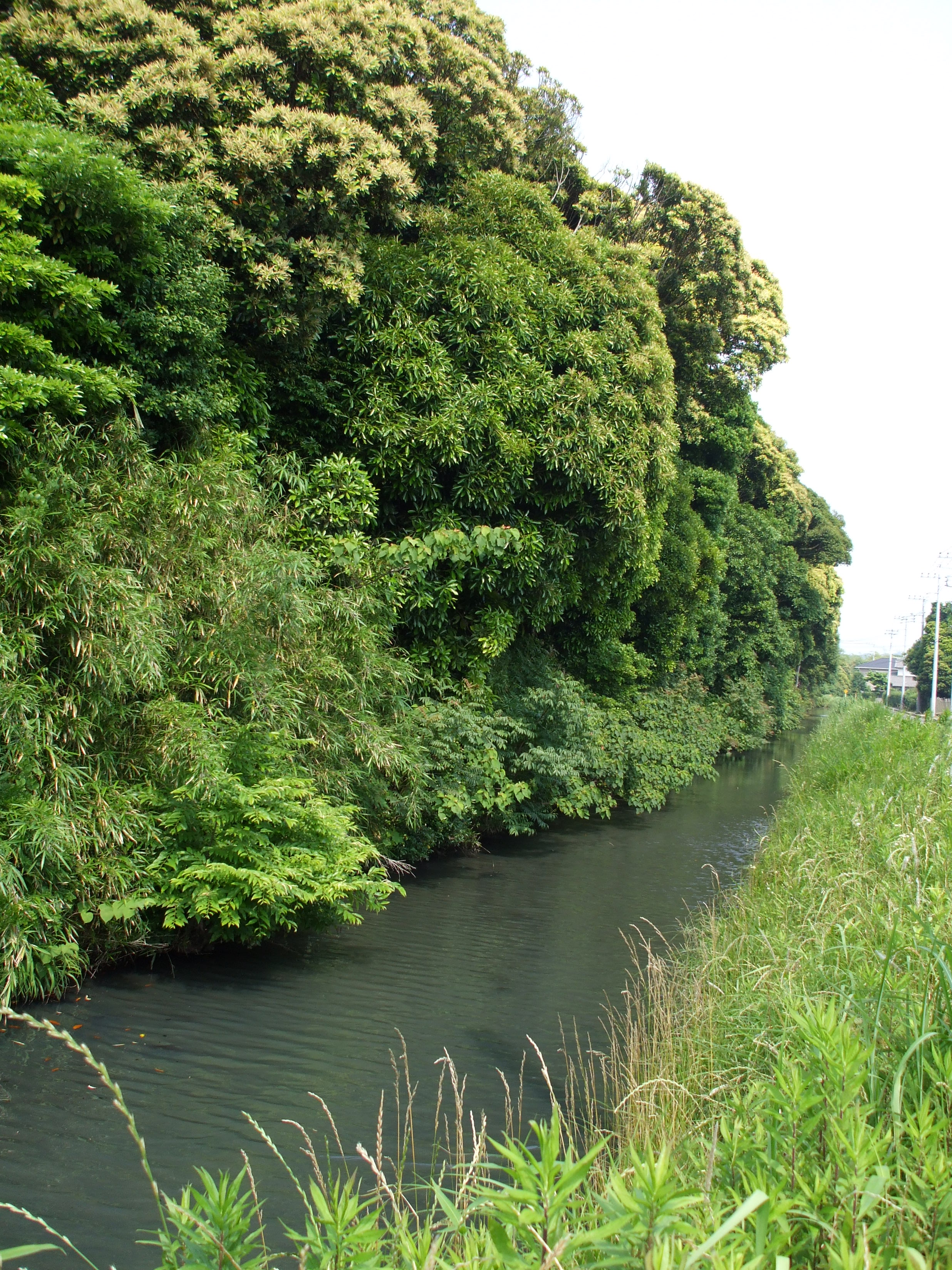
Site of Iino jin’ya in Futtsu, Chiba, administrative center of Iino Domain

Iino Domain (飯野藩, Iino-han) was a feudal domain under the Tokugawa shogunate of Edo period Japan, located in Kazusa Province (modern-day Chiba Prefecture). The domain was centered on Iino Jin’ya, a fortified residence in what is now the city of Futtsu, Chiba. It was ruled for the entirety of its history by a branch of the Hoshina clan (later Matsudaira clan) of Aizu.

== History ==
Iino Domain was created when a 7000 koku hatamoto, Hoshina Masasada was granted an additional 10,000 koku of territory in Settsu Province after his appointment as Justicar of Osaka in 1648. On his death, 2000 koku was given to his younger son, Hoshina Masafusa, reducing the domain to 15,000 koku. However, the domain expanded again to 20,000 koku under the tenure of Hoshina Masakage. The 10th (and final) daimyō of Iino Domain, Hoshina Masaari, served as wakadoshiyori, and played an important role as a commander in the Second Chōshū expedition. However, during the Boshin War, he switched sides to the Satchō Alliance and was later appointed to judge the guilt of those who had opposed the Meiji Restoration, including many of his relatives from the Hoshina clan of Aizu. Iino Domain became Iino Prefecture on the abolition of the han system in August 1871, and subsequently part of Kisarazu Prefecture, followed by Chiba Prefecture.

The domain had a population of 21,443 people in 4375 households per the 1869 census. The domain maintained its primary residence (kamiyashiki) in Edo in Azabu.

== Holdings at the end of the Edo period ==
As with most domains in the han system, Iino Domain consisted of several discontinuous territories calculated to provide the assigned kokudaka, based on periodic cadastral surveys and projected agricultural yields. In the case of Iino Domain, the exclave it controlled in Settsu Province was far larger than its home territory in Kazusa, and the domain maintained a secondary Jin’ya in that province.

- Kazusa Province
  - 10 villages in Sue District
  - 2 villages in Mouda District
  - 2 villages in Musha District
  - 4 villages in Katori District
- Settsu Province
  - 15 villages in Teshima District
  - 4 villages in Nose District
  - 9 villages in Kawabe District
  - 6 villages in Arima District
- Ōmi Province
  - 3 villages in Ika District
- Tanba Province
  - 15 villages in Amata District

== List of daimyōs ==
- Hoshina clan (fudai) 1648–1871

#	Name	Tenure	Courtesy title	Court Rank	kokudaka
1	Hoshina Masasada (保科正貞)	1648–1661	Danjō-no-jō (弾正忠)	Lower 5th (従五位下)	17,000→15,000 koku
2	Hoshina Masakage (保科正景)	1661–1686	Danjō-no-jō (弾正忠)	Lower 5th (従五位下)	15,000→20,000 koku
3	Hoshina Masakata (保科正賢)	1686–1714	Hyōbu-shōyū (兵部少輔)	Lower 5th (従五位下)	20,000 koku
4	Hoshina Masataka (保科正殷)	1715–1718	-none-	-none-	20,000 koku
5	Hoshina Masahisa (保科正寿)	1718–1739	Danjō-no-jō (弾正忠)	Lower 5th (従五位下)	20,000 koku
6	Hoshina Masatomi (保科正富)	1739–1770	Echizen-no-kami (越前守)	Lower 5th (従五位下)	20,000 koku
7	Hoshina Masanori (保科正率)	1770–1802	Danjō-no-jō (弾正忠)	Lower 5th (従五位下)	20,000 koku
8	Hoshina Masayoshi (保科正徳)	1802–1817	Shimosa-no-kami (下総守)	Lower 5th (従五位下)	20,000 koku
9	Hoshina Masamoto (保科正丕)	1817–1848	Danjō-no-jō (弾正忠)	Lower 5th (従五位下)	20,000 koku
10	Hoshina Masaari (保科正益)	1848–1871	Danjō-no-jō (弾正忠)	Lower 5th (従五位下)	20,000 koku
