= Ibuka =

Ibuka may refer to:

== People ==
- Ibuka Kajinosuke (1854–1935), Japanese samurai, ordained minister and educator of the late Edo period
- Yae Ibuka (1897–1989), Japanese nurse
- Masaru Ibuka(1908–1997), Japanese electronics industrialist and co-founder of Sony

== Other ==
- Ibuka (organisation), an umbrella organisation of groups that aid survivors of the 1994 Rwandan Genocide
