= Michi Matsuda =

Japanese educator (1868–post-1933)

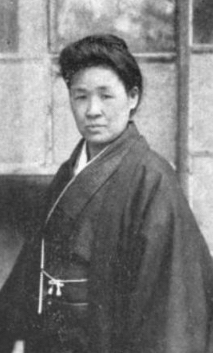
- Michi Matsuda, from a 1923 publication.
- Born: 1868; Kyoto
- Occupation: educator

Michi Matsuda (born 1868), also written as Matsuda Michi, was a Japanese educator who was head of the Doshisha Women's College (Doshisha Joshi Senmon Gakko) from 1922 to 1933. She was one of the first Japanese women to study in the United States, attending Bryn Mawr College and Columbia University.

== Early life ==
Michi Matsuda was born in Kyoto. She went to the United States in 1893 to study, beginning with two years of college preparation at Miss Stevens' school in Germantown, Pennsylvania. With a letter of recommendation from Tsuda Umeko, she attended Bryn Mawr College, earning a bachelor's degree in 1899. She was the first student to hold the American Women's Scholarship for Japanese Women, begun by Tsuda.

She returned to Bryn Mawr for further studies in economics and English from 1908 to 1910, with a scholarship from Pittsburgh Bryn Mawr Club, among other benefactors. She also attended Columbia University for graduate studies in sociology, in 1910 and 1911.

== Career ==
Matsuda taught at Kobe College from 1899 to 1904. She worked with the YWCA in Tokyo, and edited a women's journal, Meiji no Joshi, in 1907.

In 1922, she became the head of the Doshisha Women's College in Kyoto. She established majors in English, Music, and Food Science at Doshisha after 1930. She retired from the post in 1933. "Miss Matsuda's long unbroken devotion to the college, and her noble upright personality, combined with her scholarly mind, have added one more gem to the crown of Christian womanhood", commented fellow educator Kawai Michi on the occasion of Matsuda's retirement.

Matsuda served on the national committee of the YWCA in Japan, with Tsuda, Kawai, Kei Okami, and Tomo Inouye. She was named to the Doshisha University board of trustees in 1919. She was a member of the Japan branch of the Association of University Women.
