= Tsuruki Kofun Cluster =

Kofun period burial mound in Kyoto, Japan

Tsuruki Kofun Cluster (綴喜古墳群) is a Kofun cluster located in the Ōsumi-Hachiōji neighborhood of the city of Kyōtanabe, Kyoto in the Kansai region of Japan.

It is dominated by Ōsumi Kurumazuka Kofun (大住車塚古墳) a Kofun period keyhole-shaped burial mound. The tumulus was designated a National Historic Site of Japan in 1974.

The Ōsumi Minamizuka Kofun to the west has the same shape and size, but is not part of the National Historic Site designation. On November 10, 2022, the Yahatanishi Kurumazuka Kofun (八幡西車塚古墳), Tenriyama Kofun Cluster (天理山古墳群), and the Iioka Kurumazuka Kofun (飯岡車塚古墳) were additionally designated to the National Historic Site, and the name of the site was officially changed to the Tsuruki Kofun Cluster (綴喜古墳群).

== Ōsumi Kurumazuka Kofun ==
Ōsumi Kurumazuka Kofun
- 大住車塚古墳 (Japanese)
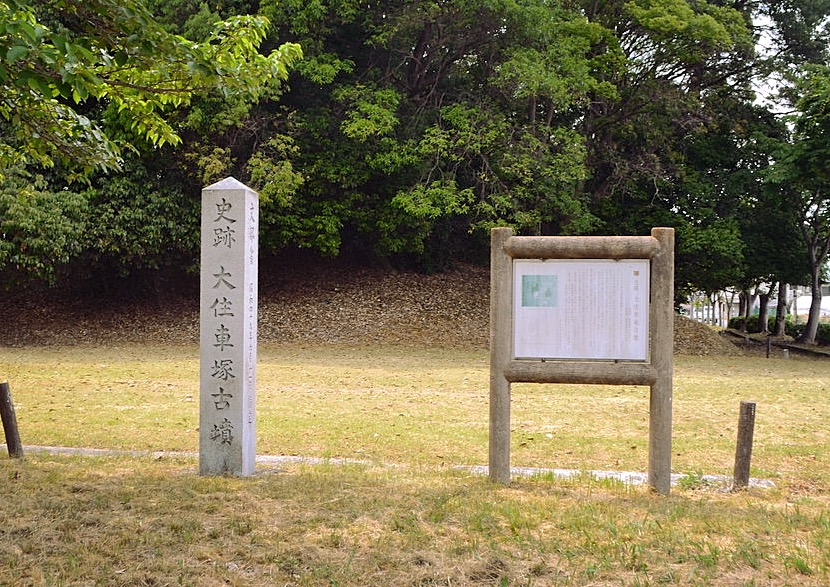
- Ōsumi Kurumazuka Kofun

- Ōsumi Kurumazuka Kofun Tsuruki Kofun Cluster (Japan)
- Interactive map of Ōsumi Kurumazuka Kofun
- 34°50′18″N 135°44′53″E
- Type: Kofun
- Periods: Kofun period
- Location: Kyōtanabe, Kyoto, Japan
- Region: Kansai region

History
- Built: c.3rd century

Site notes
- Public access: Yes (no facilities)

Ōsumi Kurumazuka Kofun (大住車塚古墳) is a Kofun period keyhole-shaped burial mound, located in the Ōsumi-Hachiōji neighborhood of the city of Kyōtanabe, Kyoto in the Kansai region of Japan. The tumulus was designated a National Historic Site of Japan in 1974.

The Ōsumi Kurumazuka Kofun is a zenpō-kōhō-fun (前方後方墳), which is shaped like two co-joined rectangles when viewed from above. It is located in the gently sloping rice fields on the west bank of the Kizu River. It was built during the early to middle Kofun period, from the end of the 4th century to the beginning of the 5th century. The total length of the tumulus is approximately 65 meters, the width at the rear is approximately 35 meters, and the width at the front facing northwest is approximately 18 meters. There are traces of a moat around the periphery, and the outer circumference is a rectangle approximately 60 meters wide and approximately 100 meters long. Fukiishi has been confirmed on the mound. The burial chamber is thought to be a pit-style stone chamber containing a clay coffin, but as it has not been excavated, surviving grave goods are unknown. According to legend, this is the tomb of the eighth son of the legendary Emperor Keitai, and it has been subsequently suspected that this legend was an Edo period fabrication.

The tumulus is about a ten-minute walk from Ōsumi Station on the JR West Katamachi Line (Gakkentoshi Line).

== See also ==
- List of Historic Sites of Japan (Kyoto)
