= Niijima Yae =

Japanese warrior, nurse, and scholar (1845–1932)

- 新島八重
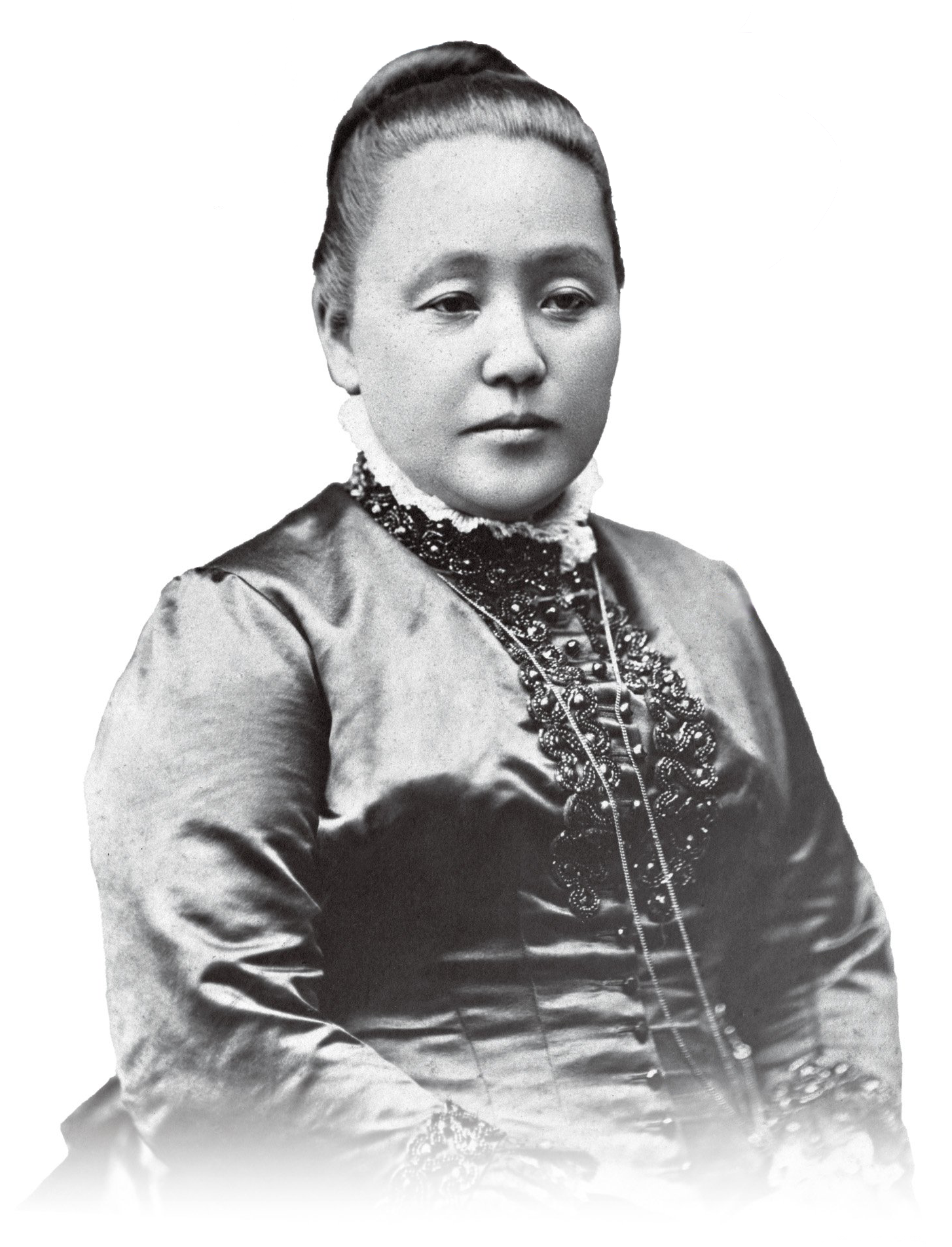
- Born: Yamamoto Yae (山本八重); 1 December 1845; Aizu, Mutsu Province, Japan
- Died: 14 June 1932 (aged 86); Kyoto, Kyoto Prefecture, Japan
- Resting place: Doshisha Cemetery, Kyoto, Japan
- Other name: Yamamoto Yaeko (山本八重子)
- Occupations: Nurse, former soldier
- Spouses: Shonosuke Kawasaki (m. 1865; div. 1871) Joseph Hardy Neesima (m. 1876; died 1890)
- Children: none
- Parents: Yamamoto Gonpachi (father); Yamamoto Saku (mother)
- Relatives: Yamamoto Kakuma (brother)
- Military career
- Allegiance: Aizu Domain
- Service years: 1868
- Conflicts: Battle of Aizu

Niijima Yae (新島八重, née Yamamoto (山本); 1 December 1845 – 14 June 1932), also known as Yamamoto Yaeko (山本 八重子), was a Japanese educator, nurse, and scholar during the Bakumatsu and Meiji era. Her samurai family belonged to the Hoshina clan, loyal to the Tokugawa Shogunate. Skilled in gunnery, she helped defend the Aizu Domain during the Boshin War, earning her the nicknames “Nightingale of Japan” and “Bakumatsu Joan of Arc”.

Yaeko served as a nurse during the Russo-Japanese War and Sino-Japanese War, and became the first woman outside of Imperial House of Japan after the Meiji Restoration (originated in the 1870s) to be decorated for her service to the country. She was famously known as the wife of Joseph Hardy Neesima, the founder of Doshisha English School in 1875. With the help of American missionary Alice J. Starkweather, they co-founded the Doshisha Girls’ School a year later.

== Early life ==
Yamamoto Yae was born the daughter of Yamamoto Gonpachi, a samurai and one of the official gunnery instructors in Aizu Domain, and his wife Saku. Her family claimed descent from the Takeda clan's retainer Yamamoto Kansuke. In 1865, she was married to Shonosuke Kawasaki, a Rangaku scholar from Izushi Domain.

=== Boshin War ===
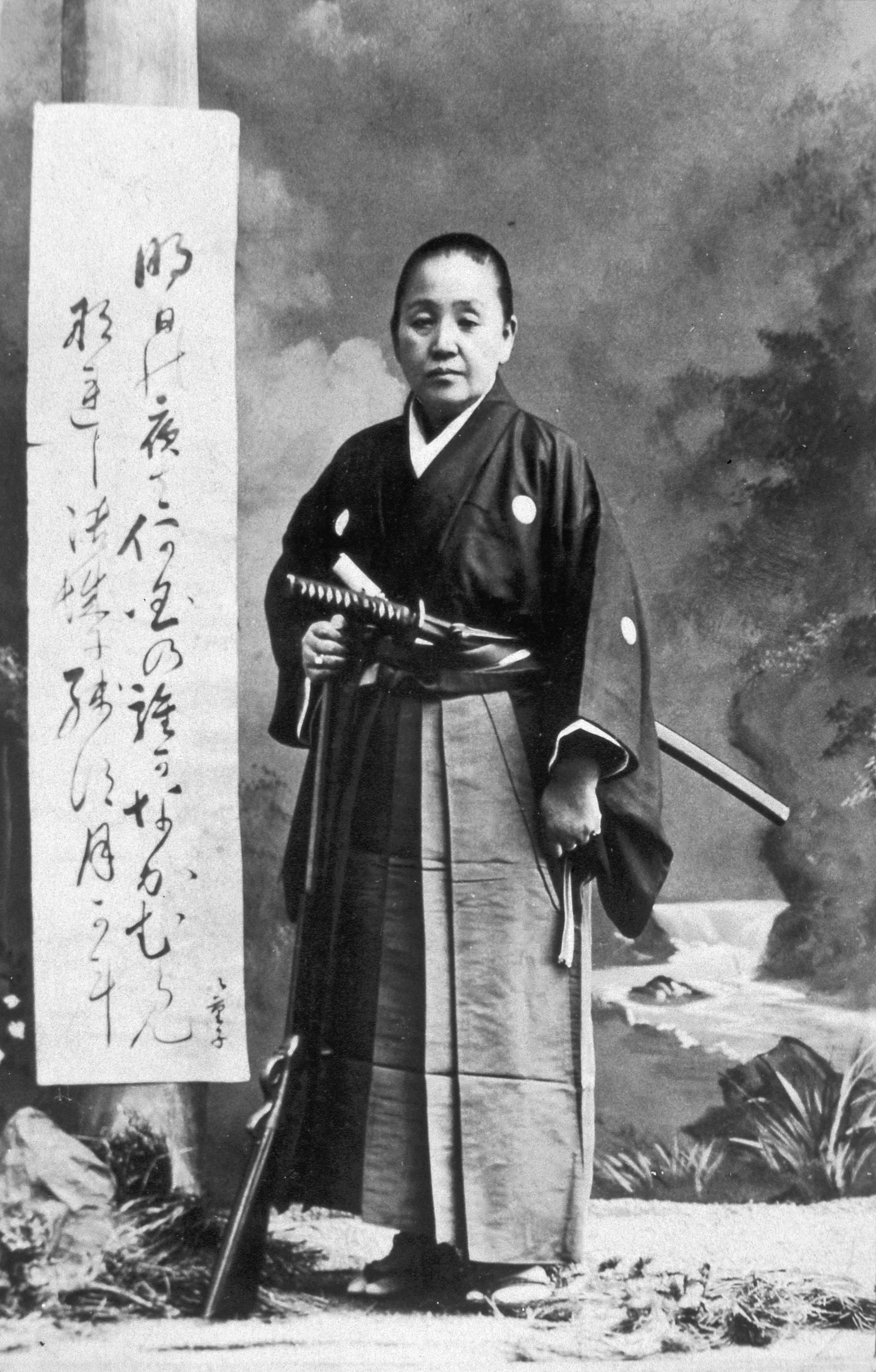
Niijama Yae with a katana, rifle and waka poem

Yae was skilled in gunnery, which was highly unusual for a woman of the Bakumatsu period. She took part in the defense of Aizu when the Boshin War broke out in 1868. During the Battle of Aizu, she fought against the Meiji government and its coalition forces, defending Aizuwakamatsu Castle with her Spencer carbine along with Aizu warriors.

After the surrender of Aizu Domain, Yaeko took shelter in nearby Yonezawa Domain in Yonezawa, Yamagata and stayed there for one year. Yae and her husband had separated after the defeat of Aizu, as Shonosuke became a prisoner of war. Their divorce was finalised in 1871.

== In Kyoto ==
In 1871, she traveled to Kyoto to look for her brother Yamamoto Kakuma, who had spent years as a prisoner of war in Satsuma custody. Upon her arrival in Kyoto, Yaeko was hired as a substitute instructor at Kyoto Women's School (ja) on the recommendation of her brother Kakuma, who was working as an advisor for the Kyoto prefectural government at that time.

While Yaeko was working at the women's school, she was acquainted with a sadō instructor from the house of Urasenke. Through their interaction, Yaeko was able to familiarise herself with the art of Japanese tea ceremony. She obtained the tea-master qualification in 1894 and became a tea master of the Urasenke tradition, with the art-name of Niijima Sōchiku (新島宗竹). During her tenure at the school, she was also acquainted with a kadō instructor from the house of Ikenobō. She was granted the certificate to practice flower arrangement from Ikenobō in 1896.

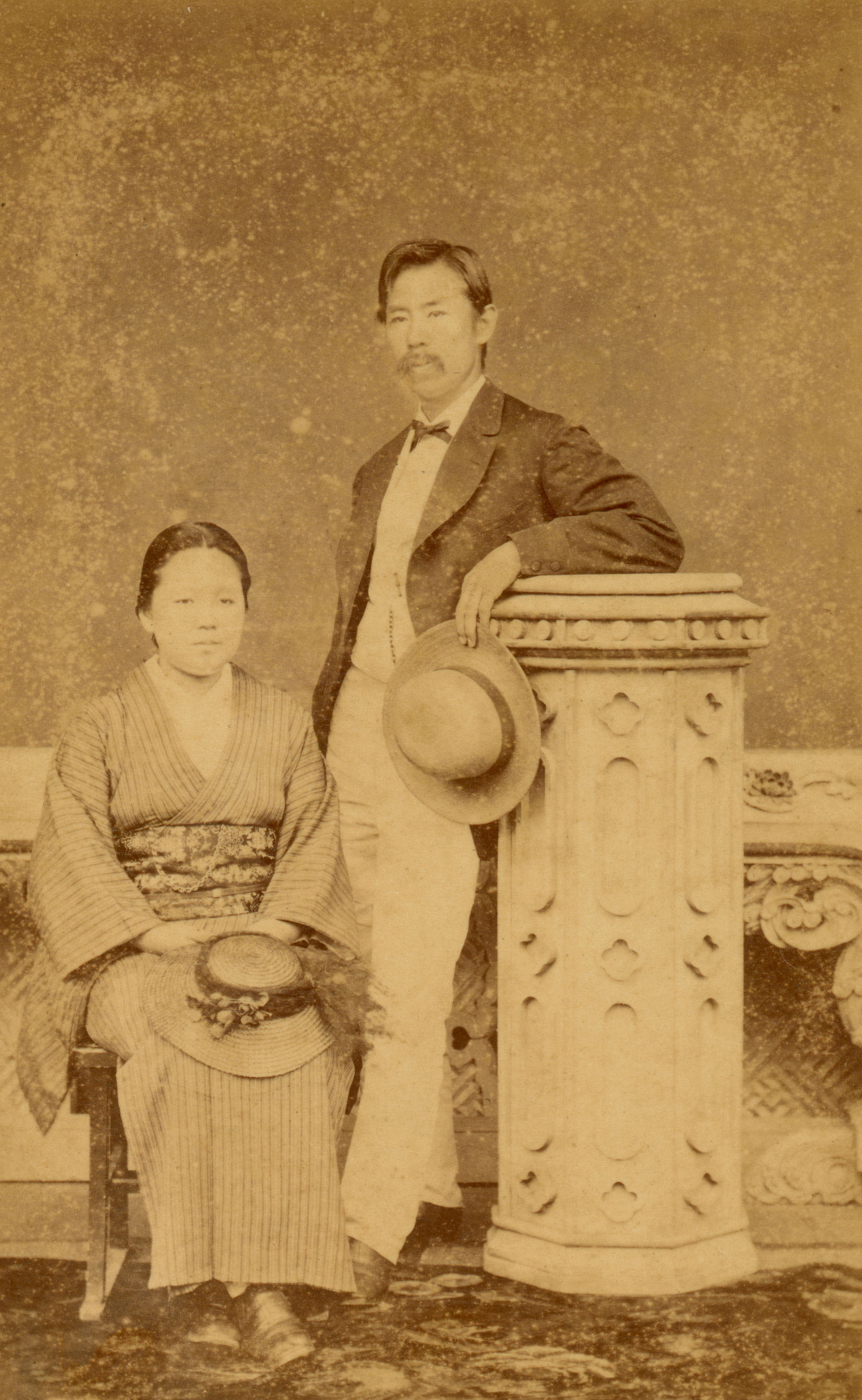
Yamamoto Yaeko and Joseph Hardy Neesima, 1876

Throughout the early 1870s, Yaeko remained in Kyoto, and became a Christian after she met Rev. Joseph Hardy Neesima, who used to visit her brother Kakuma back when they were in Aizu. Neesima was a former samurai who spent 10 years in the United States from 1864–74 to pursue higher education. He returned to Japan in 1874, and was in the process of building a Western school that promoted Christianity. However, the concept was vehemently opposed by Buddhists and Shintoists in Kyoto, who submitted several complaints to the prefectural government.

Yaeko and Neesima were engaged not long after he returned to Japan, in October 1875. Shortly afterward, Yaeko was dismissed from her position in the women's school following pressure from the government. Together with Neesima and Kakuma, Yaeko volunteered to assist in running the new school Neesima founded. She played an integral role in the founding of this Doshisha English School and its subsequent development.

Yaeko and Neesima were married on 3 January 1876. As Neesima was educated in the United States, he was also a believer in women's rights. Yaeko, with the help of the American missionary Alice J. Starkweather, opened a Joshijuku (small girls' school) at the former residence of the Yanagihara family. The girls' school was subsequently renamed to Doshisha Branch School for Girls and then to Doshisha Girls' School in 1877.

While it contradicted social norms of Edo period Japan, it happened to be balancing for a spirited woman like Yaeko. The courtesy given by Neesima toward Yaeko was viewed as a sign of shrewishness on the part of Yaeko, and she was consequently criticised as a "bad wife" by Japanese society throughout their marriage. Contrary to traditional Japanese couples, Neesima and Yaeko were friendly to each other. He praised her lifestyle as "handsome" in his letter to friends in the United States.

== Later career ==
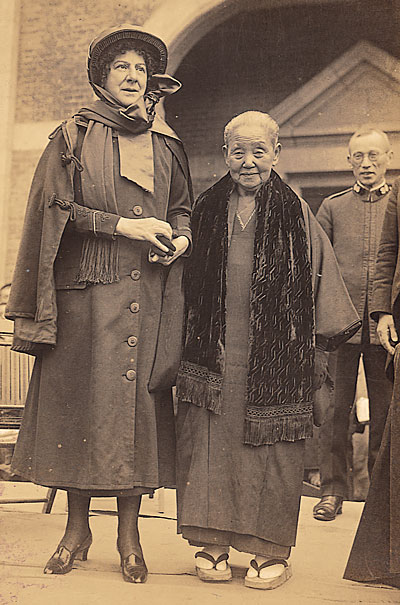
Niijima Yae (right) in her later years with Evangeline Booth, General of the Salvation Army (left), circa November 1929

Following the sudden death of Neesima on 23 January 1890, Yaeko and her colleagues at Doshisha School gradually began to drift apart. Doshisha students from Satsuma and Chōshū Domain were not warmly received by her, since they attacked Aizu during the Boshin War. In her later career, Yaeko turned her focus to nursing and became a member of Japanese Red Cross on 26 April 1890. During the First Sino-Japanese War, she joined the army and spent four months as a nurse stationed in Hiroshima. Yaeko led a team of 40 nurses to care for the wounded soldiers while working to improve the social status of trained nurses. Her efforts were recognised by the Japanese government, and she was awarded her first Order of the Precious Crown in 1896.

After the First Sino-Japanese War, Yaeko worked as an instructor in nursing schools. When the Russo-Japanese War broke out in 1904, she joined the army again and served as a volunteer nurse at Imperial Japanese Army hospital in Osaka for two months. For this service she received her second Order of the Precious Crown. She was further awarded a silver cup at the inauguration of the Shōwa Emperor in 1928 for her overall commitment to the country.

== Death ==
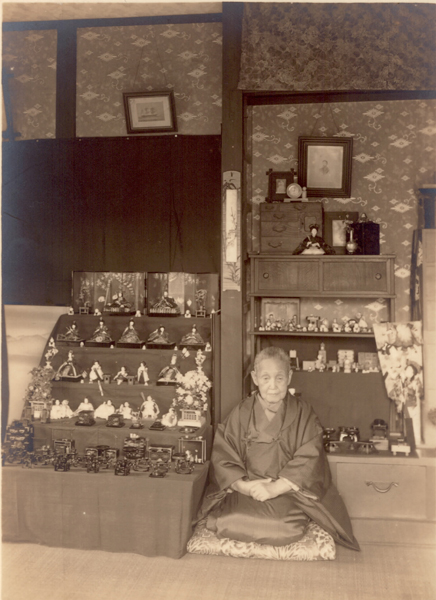
Niijima Yae on March 3, 1932, 3 months before her death

While Yaeko did not bear any children from her two marriages, she did adopt three children from Yonezawa Domain throughout her life. However, they were not closely connected. In her final years, she maintained her residence on Teramachi Street in Kyoto until she died on 14 June 1932 at the age of 86. She was given a funeral sponsored by Doshisha University. Her burial site is located at Doshisha Cemetery in Sakyō-ku, Kyoto.

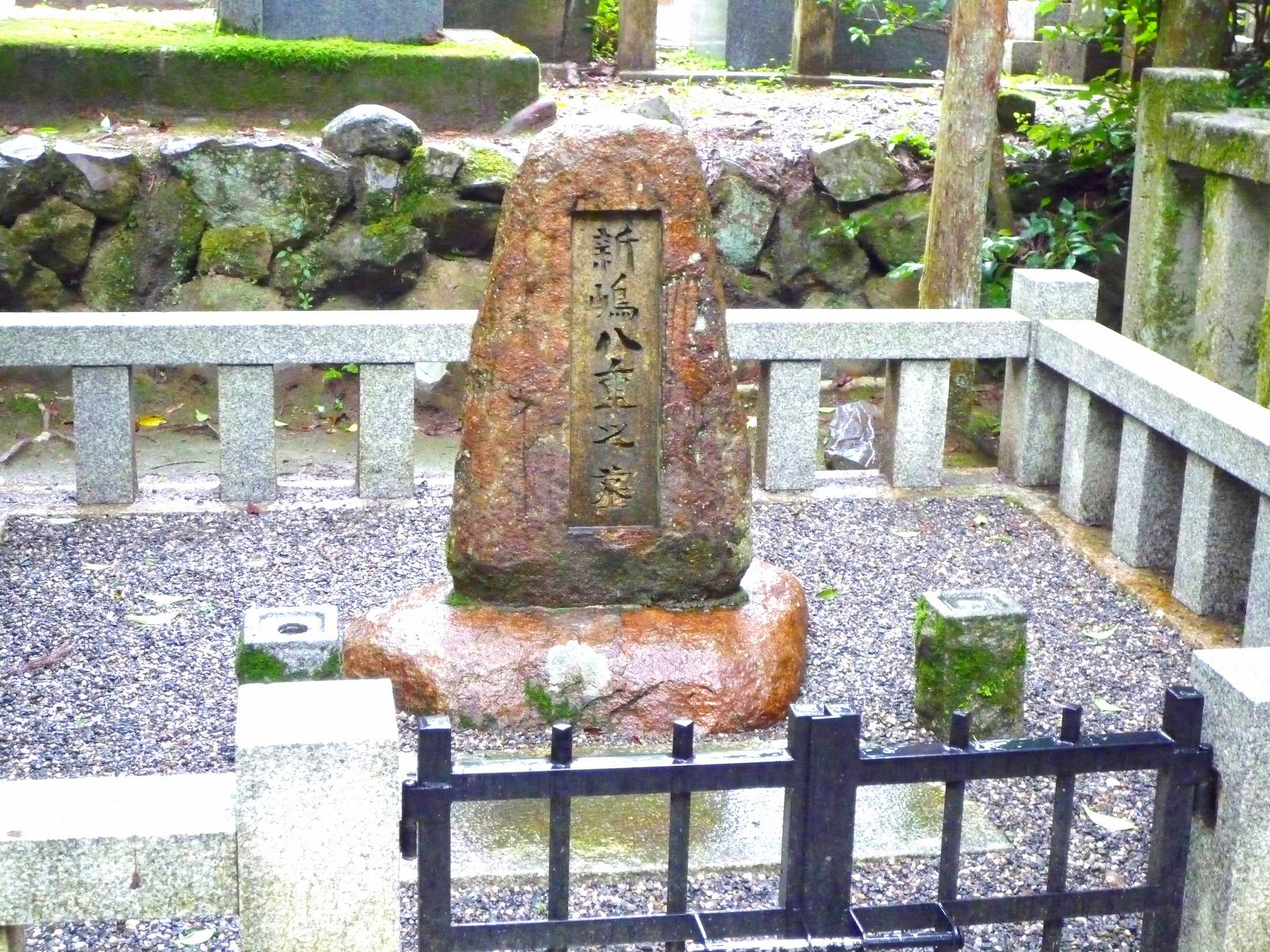
Niijima Yae's tomb stone at Doshisha Cemetery

== Honours ==
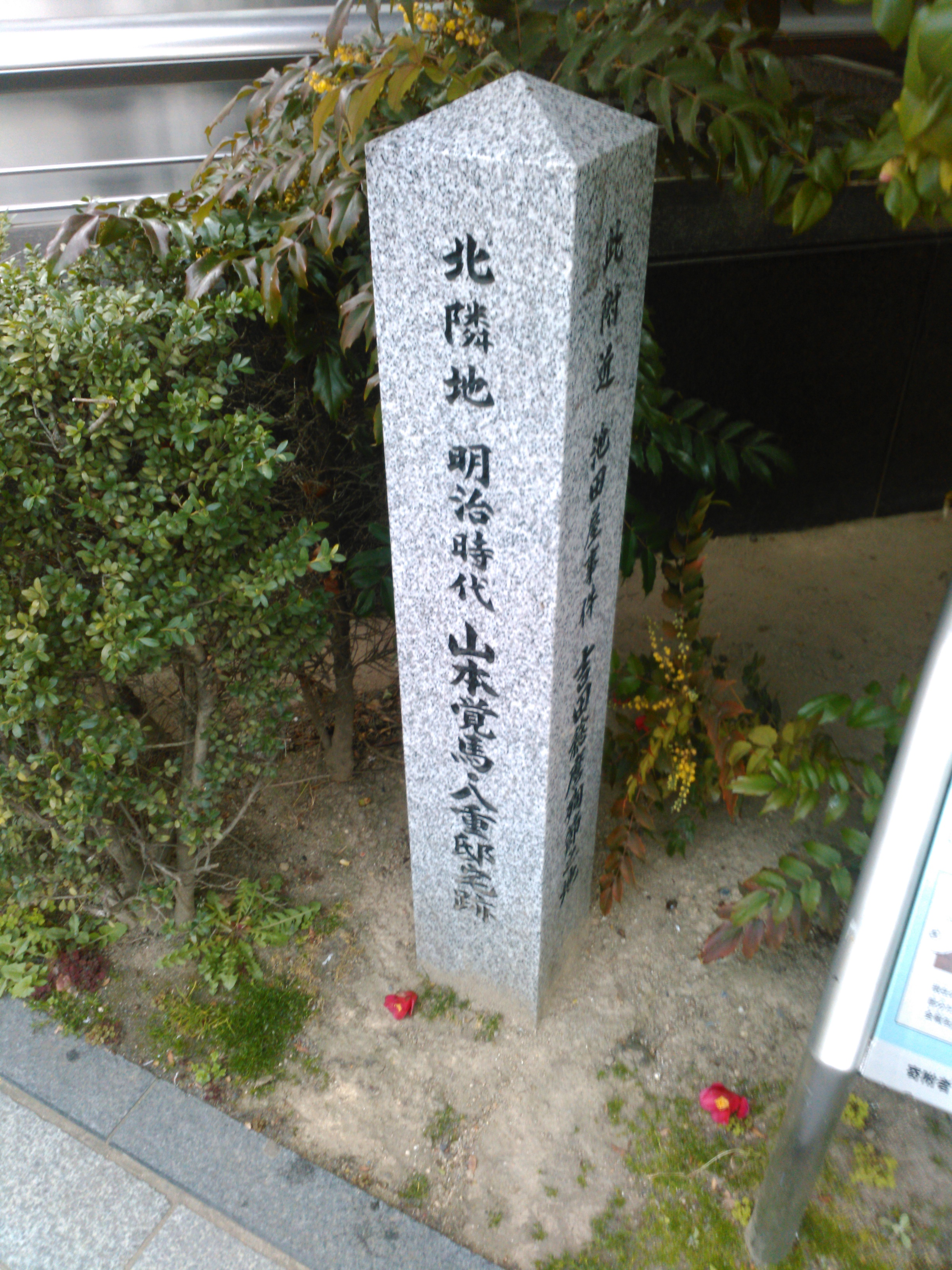
Yamamoto Kakuma and Niijima Yae's former residence monument

- Order of the Precious Crown, Seventh Class
- Order of the Precious Crown, Sixth Class

== In popular culture ==
Niijima Yae is a popular historical figure in Japan, and has appeared in various stories, comics (manga), and TV shows.

Stories

- Fukumoto Takehisa (ja), Niijima Yae series

- Aizu Onna Senki (1978) ISBN 4480802304
- Niijima Jō to Sono Tsuma (1978) ISBN 4103487011
- Handsome Woman, Saigo no Inori (2012) ISBN 978-4480804457

- Mitsugu Saotome, Meiji no Keimai (1990) ISBN 978-4404017932

Manga

- Yae no Sakura, (2013) ISBN 978-4-08-870674-0, published by Shueisha. The story was written by Yamamoto Mutsumi, and the artwork was drawn by Takemura Youhei.

TV

- The 2007 drama Byakkotai (ja) by TV Asahi, where she was portrayed by Nakagoshi Noriko.
- Yae no Sakura, the 2013 NHK taiga drama, where she is the main protagonist and portrayed by Haruka Ayase.

Games

- Tecmo Koei, Toukiden (2013)
