= Kyōtanabe =

Kyōtanabe 京田辺市
- City
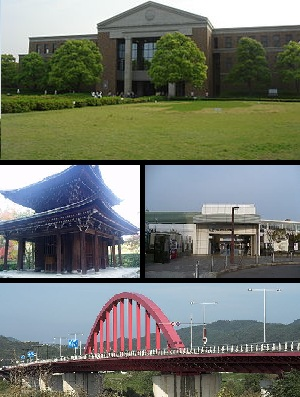
- Top:A campus of Doshisha University, Middle left:Shuonan Temple, Middle right:Matsui Yamate Station, Bottom:Yamashiro Bridge

- Flag Emblem
- Interactive map of Kyōtanabe
- Location in Japan
- Coordinates: 34°48′52″N 135°46′04″E
- Country: Japan
- Region: Kansai
- Prefecture: Kyoto

Government
  - Mayor: Takashi Kamimura (since April 2019)

Area
  - Total: 42.92 km^{2} (16.57 sq mi)

Population (September 1, 2023)
  - Total: 71,757
  - Density: 1,672/km^{2} (4,330/sq mi)
- Time zone: UTC+09:00 (JST)
- City hall address: Tanabe 80, Kyōtanabe-shi, Kyoto-fu 610-0393
- Climate: Cfa
- Website: Official website
- Symbols
- Flower: Rhododendron pulchrum
- Tree: Triadica sebifera

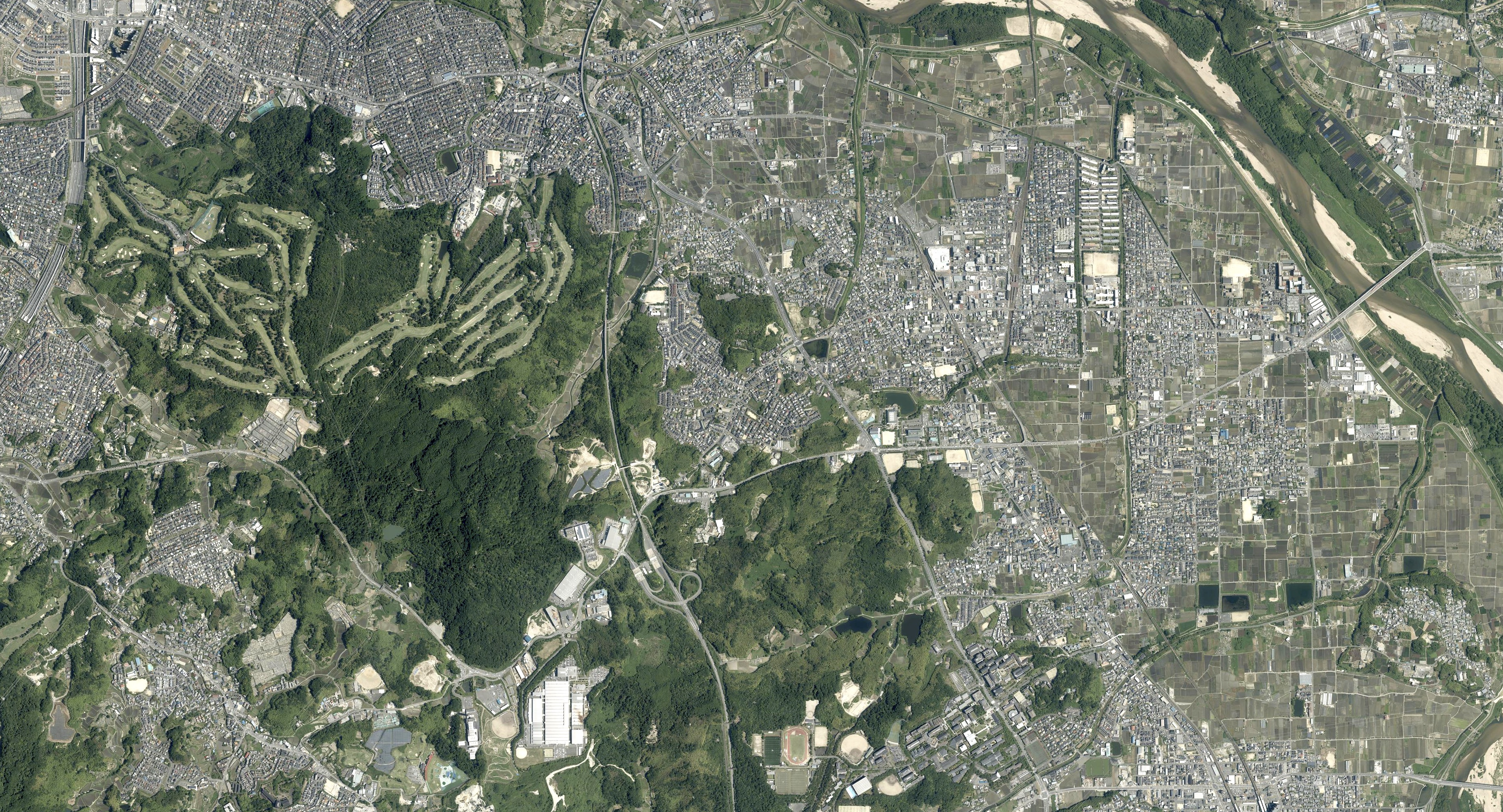
Aerial photograph of center area in 2021

Kyōtanabe (京田辺市, Kyōtanabe-shi) is a city located in the southern part of Kyoto Prefecture, Japan. As of 1 September 2023, the city has an estimated population of 71,757 in 31,555 households and a population density of 1700 persons per km^{2}. The total area of the city is 42.92 square kilometres (16.57 sq mi).

== Geography ==
Kyōtanabe is located in southern Kyoto Prefecture, bordered by Osaka Prefecture and Nara Prefecture. It is one of the three "Kansai Cultural and Academic Research City municipalities". The city is sandwiched between the Kizugawa River, which runs north–south on the east side of the city, and the Ikoma Mountains on the west.

=== Neighboring municipalities ===
Kyoto Prefecture

- Jōyō
- Kizugawa
- Sōraku District (Seika)
- Tsuzuki District (Ide)
- Yawata

Nara Prefecture

- Ikoma

Osaka Prefecture

- Hirakata

=== Climate ===
Kyōtanabe has a humid subtropical climate (Köppen Cfa), featuring a marked seasonal variation in temperature and precipitation. Summers are hot and humid, but winters are relatively cold with occasional snowfall. The average annual temperature in Kyōtanabe is 15.3 °C (59.5 °F). The average annual rainfall is 1,429.8 mm (56.29 in) with June as the wettest month. The temperatures are highest on average in August, at around 27.5 °C (81.5 °F), and lowest in January, at around 4.1 °C (39.4 °F). Its record high is 39.3 °C (102.7 °F), reached on 25 July 2026, and its record low is −6.8 °C (19.8 °F), reached on 27 February 1981.

Climate data for Kyōtanabe (1991−2020 normals, extremes 1978−present)
| Month | Jan | Feb | Mar | Apr | May | Jun | Jul | Aug | Sep | Oct | Nov | Dec | Year |
|---|---|---|---|---|---|---|---|---|---|---|---|---|---|
| Record high °C (°F) | 17.6 (63.7) | 22.8 (73.0) | 25.9 (78.6) | 30.6 (87.1) | 33.8 (92.8) | 37.5 (99.5) | 39.3 (102.7) | 39.0 (102.2) | 37.2 (99.0) | 32.7 (90.9) | 27.2 (81.0) | 23.3 (73.9) | 39.3 (102.7) |
| Mean daily maximum °C (°F) | 9.1 (48.4) | 10.0 (50.0) | 13.9 (57.0) | 19.9 (67.8) | 24.9 (76.8) | 28.0 (82.4) | 31.8 (89.2) | 33.4 (92.1) | 29.0 (84.2) | 23.2 (73.8) | 17.2 (63.0) | 11.6 (52.9) | 21.0 (69.8) |
| Daily mean °C (°F) | 4.1 (39.4) | 4.6 (40.3) | 8.0 (46.4) | 13.5 (56.3) | 18.6 (65.5) | 22.6 (72.7) | 26.5 (79.7) | 27.5 (81.5) | 23.4 (74.1) | 17.4 (63.3) | 11.3 (52.3) | 6.2 (43.2) | 15.3 (59.6) |
| Mean daily minimum °C (°F) | −0.6 (30.9) | −0.4 (31.3) | 2.3 (36.1) | 7.2 (45.0) | 12.6 (54.7) | 18.0 (64.4) | 22.4 (72.3) | 23.0 (73.4) | 18.9 (66.0) | 12.4 (54.3) | 6.2 (43.2) | 1.4 (34.5) | 10.3 (50.5) |
| Record low °C (°F) | −6.6 (20.1) | −6.8 (19.8) | −4.1 (24.6) | −2.1 (28.2) | 0.2 (32.4) | 6.7 (44.1) | 13.8 (56.8) | 14.5 (58.1) | 9.1 (48.4) | 2.6 (36.7) | −1.8 (28.8) | −5.1 (22.8) | −6.8 (19.8) |
| Average precipitation mm (inches) | 51.0 (2.01) | 63.4 (2.50) | 108.0 (4.25) | 106.8 (4.20) | 141.0 (5.55) | 204.2 (8.04) | 181.5 (7.15) | 152.3 (6.00) | 156.9 (6.18) | 140.0 (5.51) | 74.0 (2.91) | 56.9 (2.24) | 1,429.8 (56.29) |
| Average precipitation days (≥ 1.0 mm) | 6.0 | 6.6 | 10.0 | 10.0 | 9.9 | 12.0 | 11.4 | 8.7 | 10.7 | 9.4 | 6.7 | 6.5 | 107.9 |
| Mean monthly sunshine hours | 130.5 | 127.8 | 167.2 | 186.3 | 201.9 | 155.0 | 170.9 | 216.7 | 163.3 | 162.8 | 141.4 | 138.0 | 1,961.8 |
Source: Japan Meteorological Agency

== Demographics ==
Per Japanese census data, the population of Kyōtanabe in 2020 is 73,753 people. Kyōtanabe's population has increased roughly sevenfold over the past century. The city has grown almost continuously since the census began in 1920, and saw especially rapid growth in the late 20th century.

Historical population

| Year | Pop. | ±% |
|---|---|---|
| 1920 | 10,921 | — |
| 1925 | 10,895 | −0.2% |
| 1930 | 11,404 | +4.7% |
| 1935 | 12,018 | +5.4% |
| 1940 | 12,505 | +4.1% |
| 1945 | 15,332 | +22.6% |
| 1950 | 15,391 | +0.4% |
| 1955 | 15,387 | −0.0% |
| 1960 | 15,793 | +2.6% |
| 1965 | 17,333 | +9.8% |
| 1970 | 21,507 | +24.1% |

| Year | Pop. | ±% |
|---|---|---|
| 1975 | 30,022 | +39.6% |
| 1980 | 39,198 | +30.6% |
| 1985 | 44,465 | +13.4% |
| 1990 | 48,899 | +10.0% |
| 1995 | 53,040 | +8.5% |
| 2000 | 59,577 | +12.3% |
| 2005 | 64,008 | +7.4% |
| 2010 | 67,904 | +6.1% |
| 2015 | 70,835 | +4.3% |
| 2020 | 73,753 | +4.1% |

Kyōtanabe population statistics

== History ==
The area of Kyōtanabe was part of ancient Yamashiro Province. Kyōtanabe was briefly the capital of Japan during the reign of the legendary Kofun period Emperor Keitai. The life of the Imperial court was centered at Tsutsuki Palace where the emperor lived in 511–518. The village of Tanabe in Tsuzuki District, Kyoto was established on April 1, 1889 with the creation of the modern municipalities system and was elevated to town status on October 12, 1906. On April 1, 1997 Tanabe was elevated to city status, as the 12th city in Kyoto Prefecture after Yawata, and the 669th city in Japan. In order to avoid confusion with Tanabe, Wakayama, the city was named "Kyōtanabe" by adding "Kyō" from Kyoto Prefecture.

== Government ==
Kyōtanabe has a mayor-council form of government with a directly elected mayor and a unicameral city council of 20 members. Kyōtanabe, collectively with the municipalities of Tsuzuki District, Kyoto contributes two members to the Kyoto Prefectural Assembly. In terms of national politics, the city is part of the Kyoto 6th district of the lower house of the Diet of Japan.

== Economy ==
Kyōtanabe has a mixed economy based on commerce, agriculture and light manufacturing. Tsubakimoto Chain, Dai Nippon Printing and Meiji have major factories in the city.

== Education ==
=== Colleges and universities ===
- Doshisha Women's College of Liberal Arts
- Doshisha Women's Junior College

=== Primary and secondary education ===
Kyōtanabe has nine public elementary schools and three public junior high schools operated by city government and one public high school operated by the Kyoto Prefectural Board of Education. There is also one private junior high and one private high school.

== Transportation ==
=== Railways ===
JR West - Katamachi Line (Gakkentoshi Line)

- JR Miyamaki - Dōshishamae - Kyōtanabe - Ōsumi - Matsuiyamate

- Kintetsu Railway Kyoto Line

- Shin-Tanabe - Kōdo - Miyamaki - Kintetsu Miyazu

=== Highways ===
- Shin-Meishin Expressway
- Daini Keihan Expressway
- Keinawa Expressway
- National Route 1
- National Route 24
- National Route 307

== Local attractions ==
- Ōsumi Kurumazuka Kofun, National Historic Site

== Notable people from Kyōtanabe ==
- Meg Hemphill, track and field athlete
- Momo Hirai, singer, dancer, model, MC, member of South Korean girl group Twice
- Akinari Kawazura, football player (Omiya Ardija, J2 League)
- Takuya Muguruma, former football player
- Kenji Takao, running coach and former long-distance runner (10,000 metres)
