= Doshisha Women's Junior College =

- 同志社女子大学短期大学部
- Type: private
- Active: 1986–2003
- Location: Kyōtanabe, Kyoto, Japan
- Website: http://www.dwc.doshisha.ac.jp/about/chronology.html

Doshisha Women's Junior College (同志社女子大学短期大学部, Doshisha Joshi Daigaku Tanki Daigakubu) is a private junior college in Kyōtanabe, Kyoto, Japan.

== History ==
（References:）

- In 1986 the Junior College was established at City of Kyōtanabe.
- In 1999 the Junior College was the last year of registration of student.
- In 2003 the Junior College was discontinued.

== Names of Academic department ==
- Japanese language and Literature
- English language

== Advanced course ==
- None

== See also ==
- Doshisha Women's College of Liberal Arts
- Doshisha University
