= Yamamoto Kakuma =

Japanese samurai

Yamamoto Kakuma 山本覚馬
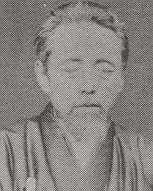
- Yamamoto Kakuma
- Born: February 25, 1828; Aizu, Japan
- Died: December 28, 1892 (aged 64); Kyoto, Japan

Yamamoto Kakuma (山本 覚馬; February 25, 1828 – December 28, 1892) was a Japanese samurai of the late Edo period, who went on to become an educator and politician in the Meiji era.

== Biography ==
A native of Aizu, Yamamoto claimed descent from the famed military strategist Yamamoto Kansuke. A child prodigy, he could read at age four, and recite Chinese Jueju poetry at age five. He was sent to Edo at age 22, to study with Katsu Kaishū, under the direction of Sakuma Shōzan, rangaku and modern military science. He returned to Aizu at age 28, and became an instructor of hōjutsu at the Nisshinkan, the Aizu domain's academy.

In 1862, he was assigned to assist the Aizu Domain daimyō Matsudaira Katamori during the latter's tenure in Kyoto as Kyoto Shugoshoku. The situation in Kyoto was very unsettled, and Yamamoto fought against Chōshū Domain samurai during the Kinmon Incident on August 20, 1864. After the start of the Boshin War of the Meiji Restoration, he did not participate in the nearby Battle of Toba–Fushimi, but remained behind with his forces in Kyoto itself to attack the fortified residence of the Satsuma Domain. During the attack, he suffered a concussion and subsequently lost his eyesight. He was taken into custody by Satsuma forces soon afterwards. After the end of the war, he was pardoned through the intercession of Iwakura Tomomi.

Yamamoto's sister was Neesima Yae, who also fought in the Boshin War; he introduced his sister to Joseph Hardy Neesima and they later married.

Yamamoto served as a member of the Kyoto Prefectural Assembly. After becoming a Christian, he worked with Joseph Hardy Neesima to found Doshisha University in Kyoto. Kakuma himself served as the university's second president.

Apart from his work in education, Yamamoto was also an author. One of his best-known works was a lengthy work on national reform, penned during his captivity in 1868.

Yamamoto was portrayed by actor Ryū Raita in the 1987 miniseries Byakkotai, and by the actor Hidetoshi Nishijima in the 2013 NHK taiga drama Yae no Sakura.
