= Aizu =

Region of Fukushima, Japan

Aizu 会津
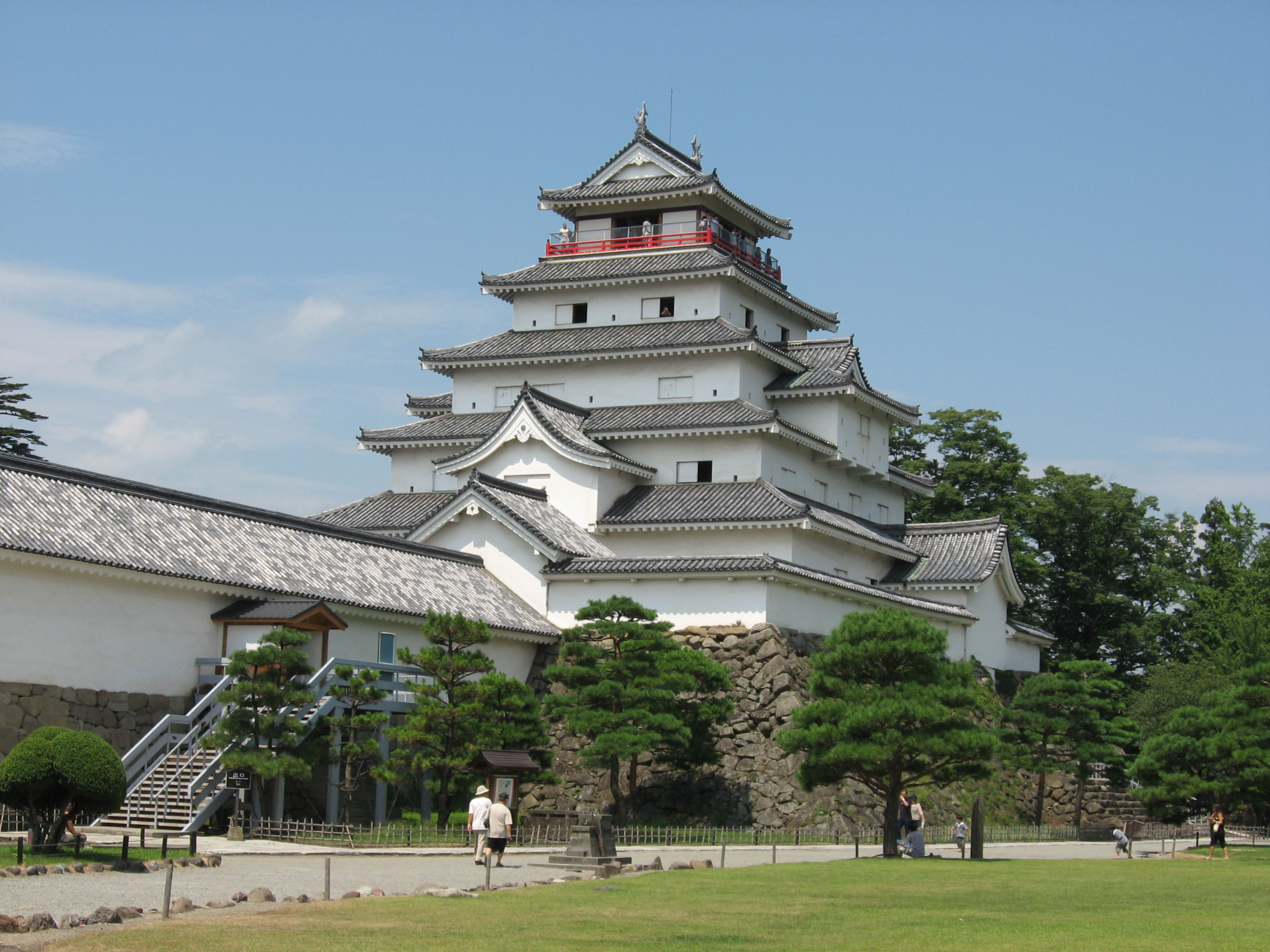
- Tsuruga Castle, located in Aizuwakamatsu

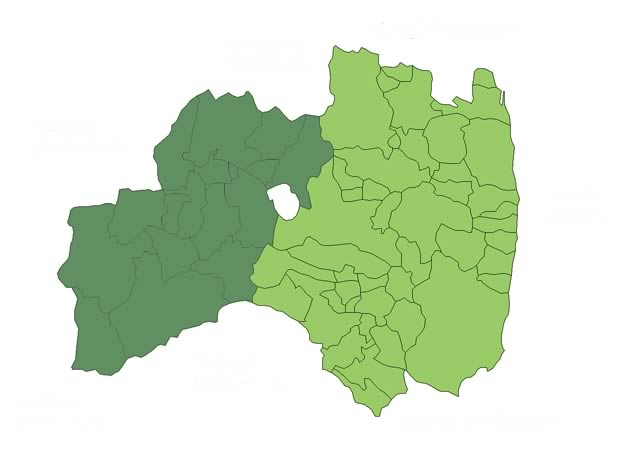
- Aizu comprises the western third of Fukushima Prefecture
- Country: Japan
- Prefecture: Fukushima

Area
  - Total: 5,420.69 km^{2} (2,092.94 sq mi)

Population (1 October 2017)
  - Total: 270,648
  - Density: 49.9287/km^{2} (129.315/sq mi)

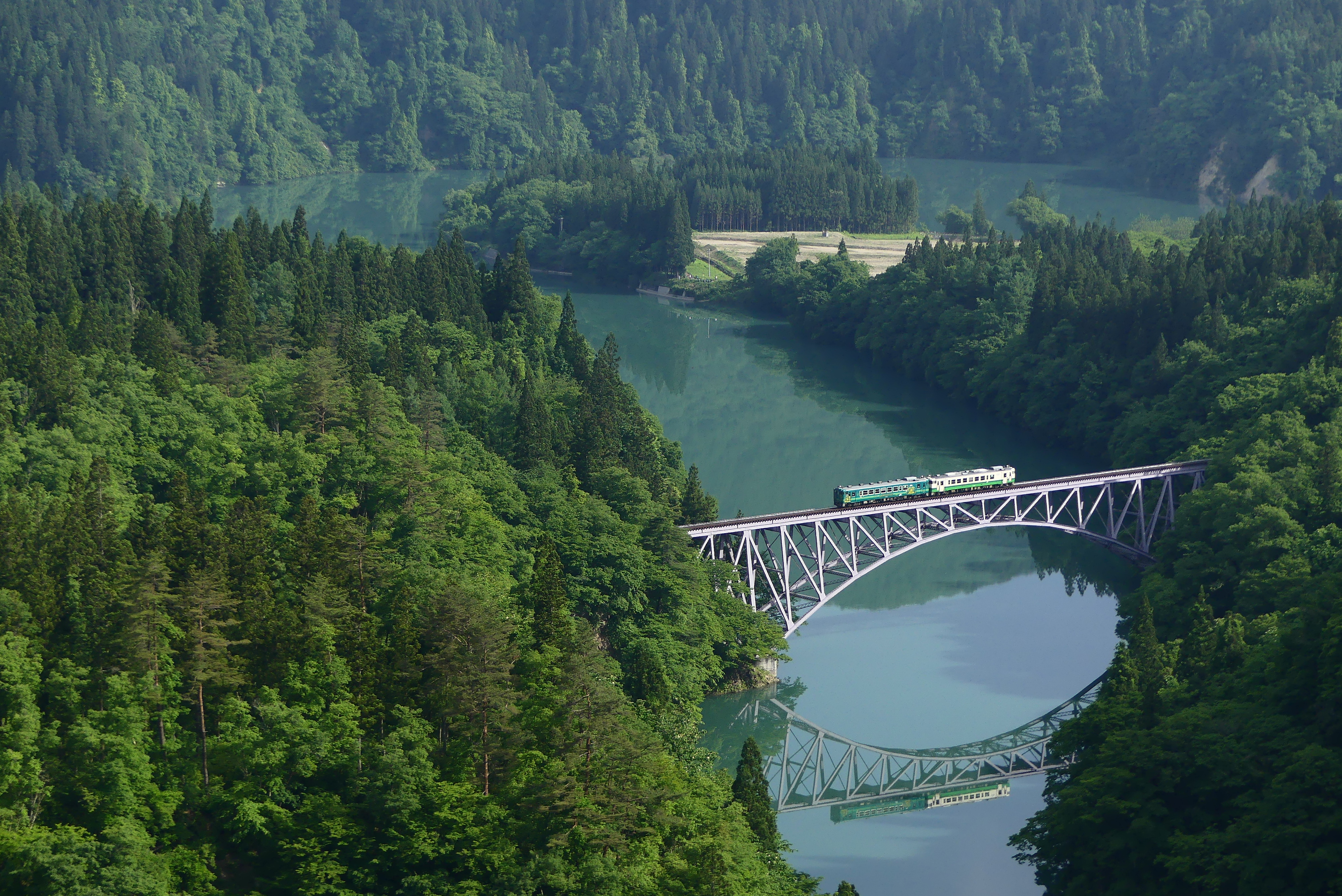
Tadami River and Tadami Line

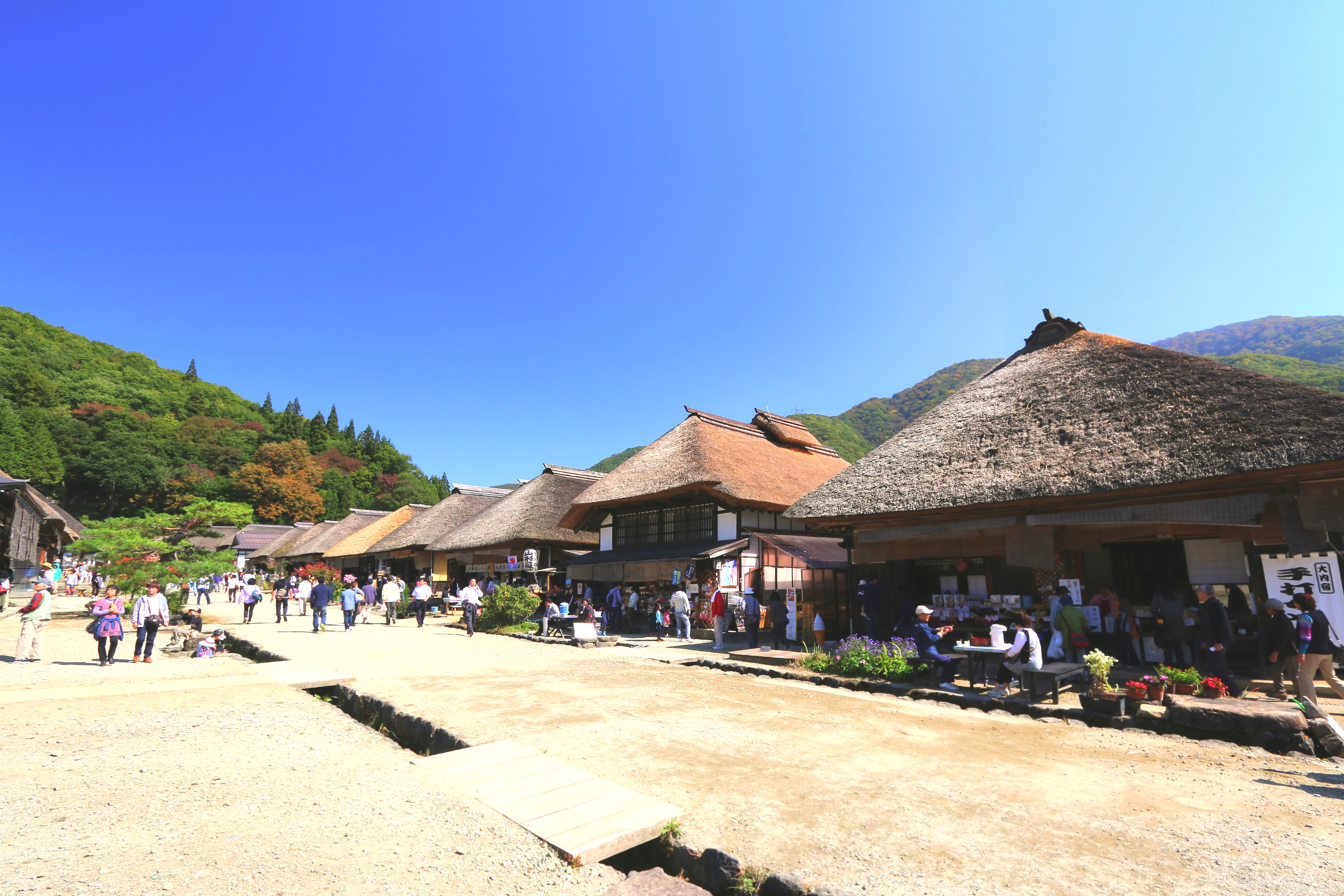
Ōuchi-juku

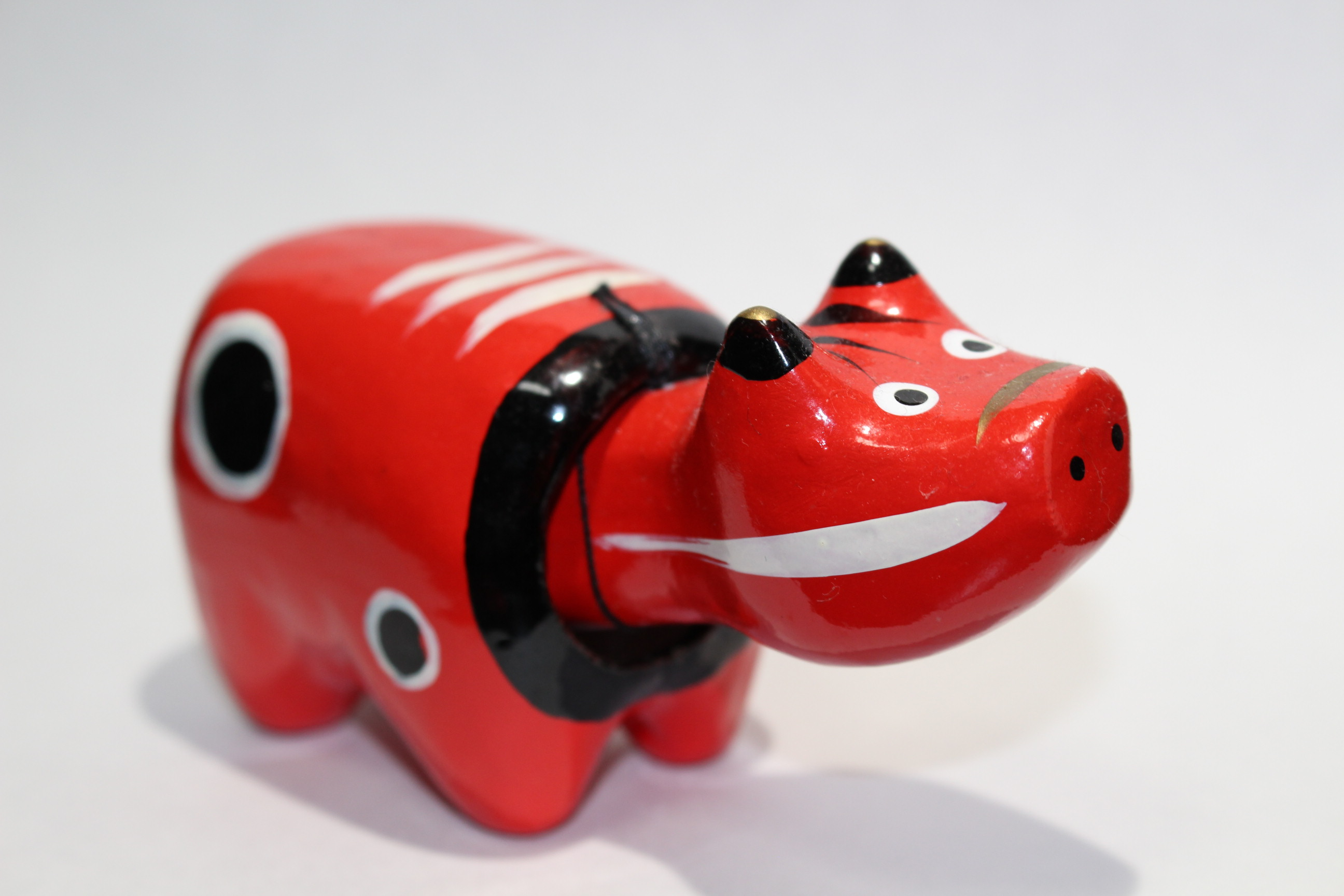
Akabeko

Aizu (会津) is the westernmost of the three regions of Fukushima Prefecture, Japan. The other two regions are Nakadōri in the central area of the prefecture and Hamadōri in the east. As of October 1, 2010, it had a population of 291,838. The principal city of the area is Aizuwakamatsu.

It was part of Mutsu Province; the area once was part of Iwase Province created during the reign of Empress Genshō. The Yōrō Ritsuryo established the Iwase Province in 718 through the division of the Michinoku Province (Mutsu Province). It was composed of five districts of Shirakawa (白河), Iwase (石背), Aizu (会津), Asaka (安積) and Shinobu (信夫). The area encompassed by the province reverted to Mutsu some time between 722 and 724.

During the Edo period, Aizu Domain (会津藩, Aizu-han) was a feudal domain under the Tokugawa shogunate which ruled most of the region from Aizuwakamatsu Castle. Following the Meiji restoration, it became part of the short-lived Iwashiro Province before becoming a region of Fukushima Prefecture.

Although never an official province in its own right, Aizu has a very strong regional identity.

== Notable people ==
The following list is alphabetized by Japanese name order (i.e. surname followed by given name).

- Akizuki Teijirō (1824–1900), Aizu samurai, educator.
- Dewa Shigetō (1856–1930), an admiral of the Imperial Japanese Navy, elevated to the peerage with the title of danshaku (baron).
- Ibuka Kajinosuke (1854–1935), former samurai turned Christian pastor, responsible for bringing the YMCA to Japan.
- Ito Okei (1852-1871), Japanese woman who immigrated to America as part of the Wakamatsu Tea and Silk Farm Colony; subsequently, she is also the first to be buried on American soil.
- Matsudaira Setsuko (1909–1995), daughter of Matsudaira Tsuneo; later married Yasuhito, Prince Chichibu, Emperor Hirohito's brother.
- Matsudaira Teru (1832–1884), female warrior, she was an aristocrat during the late Edo, she participated in the siege of Aizuwakamatsu Castle.
- Matsudaira Tsuneo (1877–1949), son of Matsudaira Katamori, ambassador to the U.S. and UK.
- Nakano Takeko (1847–1868), female warrior.
- Niijima Yae (born: Yamamoto Yaeko, 1845–1932), female warrior, co-founder of Doshisha University, instructor in the women's division of Doshisha and wife of Niijima Jo (Joseph Hardy Neesima), nurse, tea master.
- Noguchi Hideyo (1876–1928), a doctor who made considerable contributions to the fight against syphilis and yellow fever.
- Saigō Tanomo (1830–1903), former chief councilor of the Aizu clan; later, a teacher of Sōkaku Takeda and a chief priest of the Tōshōgū Shrine.
- Saitō Kiyoshi (1907–1997), sōsaku-hanga artist.
- Satō Kei (1928–2010), film actor.
- Shiba Gorō (1860–1945), prominent at the Siege of the Peking Legations, 1900.
- Takamine Hideo (1854–1910), former samurai, graduate of Oswego Normal School in New York State, Meiji-era educator and head of the Tokyo Normal School, Tokyo Art School, Tokyo Women's Normal School and Tokyo Music School. He is best known for introducing Pestallozian teaching methods to Japan and educational reform.
- Takeda Sōkaku, a famous martial artist of Daito Ryu.
- Tokugawa Tsunenari (1940– ), grandson of Matsudaira Tsuneo; former head of the main Tokugawa family.
- Uryu Iwako (1829–1897), prominent social worker.
- Yamakawa Futaba (1844–1909), a co-worker of Takamine Hideo, head administrator at the Tokyo Women's Normal School, she is best known for her support of women's education.
- Yamakawa Hiroshi (1845–1898) Brother of Kenjiro, Sutematsu, and Futaba; a notable military leader who defended the domain, later organized Aizu refugees, a key figure in the relief of Kumamoto Garrison during the Seinan War or Satsuma Rebellion and General in the Meiji Era.
- Yamakawa Kenjirō (1854–1931), graduate of Yale University, physicist, researcher, academic administrator, President of Tokyo University and Kyoto University.
- Yamakawa Sutematsu (1860–1919), graduate of Vassar College, after marriage to Oyama Iwao, she was known as Oyama Sutematsu, an organizer at the Rokumeikan, supporter of numerous organizations such as the Red-Cross in Japan and Women's Patriotic Society. She assisted in the founding of Tsuda College (which was organized by her close lifelong friend Tsuda Umeko).
- Yamamoto Kakuma (1828–1892), former samurai, co-founder of Doshisha University.
