= Ibuka Kajinosuke =

Japanese samurai

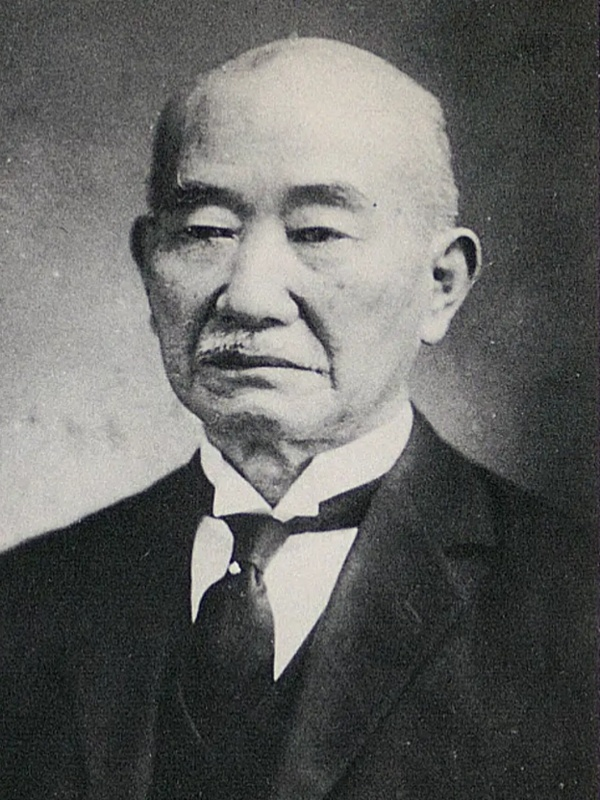
Rev.Ibuka Kajinosuke

Ibuka Kajinosuke (井深 梶之助; July 4, 1854 – June 24, 1940) was a Japanese samurai of the late Edo period, who became a Christian during the Meiji period. He was born in Aizu, and fought in the Boshin War. In his adult life, he also became an ordained minister; he was also an educator.
