= Hoshina Masakage =

Japanese daimyō

Hoshina Masakage (保科 正景) (October 15, 1616 – July 2, 1700) was a Japanese daimyō of the Edo period, who ruled the Iino Domain. His court title was Danjō no chū. He was the son of Hoshina Masasada, but was dispossessed of family headship due to his father's adoption of an outside heir. However, after his father's death, Masakage was reinstated, and inherited rulership of the Iino domain. He held a variety of low to mid-level posts in the Tokugawa shogunate, including that of Nikkō Sairei-bugyō, connected with the shrine of Tokugawa Ieyasu at Nikkō.

Preceded by Hoshina Masasada	2nd (Hoshina) Daimyō of Iino; 1661–1686	Succeeded by Hoshina Masakata
