= Joseph Hardy Neesima =

Japanese missionary (1843–1890)

- Niijima Jō (新島 襄)
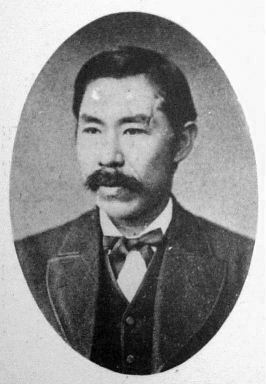
- Joseph Hardy Neesima
- Born: Niijima Shimeta; February 12, 1843; Edo, Musashi Province, Japan
- Died: January 23, 1890 (aged 46); Oiso, Kanagawa Prefecture, Japan
- Other name: Niijima Jō
- Occupation: educator
- Known for: first Japanese person to receive a bachelor's degree, founder of Doshisha University
- Spouse: Yamamoto Yaeko (m. 1876–1890)
- Parent(s): Niijima Tamiji (father); Niijima Tomi (mother)

Academic background
- Education: Phillips Academy; Amherst College; Andover Theological Seminary

Academic work
- Era: Meiji era
- Institutions: Doshisha English School (founder)

Niijima Jō (新島 襄) (born Niijima Shimeta (新島 七五三太); 12 February 1843 – 23 January 1890), better known by his English name Joseph Hardy Neesima, was a Japanese Protestant missionary and educator of the Meiji era who founded Doshisha English School (later Doshisha University).

He was the husband of Yamamoto Yaeko, a former soldier and nurse who served during the Boshin War, Russo-Japanese and Sino-Japanese War, who later founded Doshisha Girls' School.

== Early life ==
He was born in Edo (present-day Tokyo), the son of a retainer of the Itakura clan of Annaka. His childhood name was Niijima Shimeta (新島 七五三太). He attended Tokugawa Naval School from 1861.

When he was 21, he went to Hakodate, a port in the far north of Japan which was open to foreigners. He met Nicholas of Japan, chaplain of the Russian consulate there, and helped him to learn Japanese - Nicholai went on to establish the Russian Orthodox Church in Japan.

In 1864, laws on national isolation were still in effect in Japan, and Japanese people were not permitted to travel overseas without government permission. However, Niijima had read extensively on various rangaku topics, and was determined to go to America. At the age of 21, he entreated Captain William T. Savory, of Salem, Massachusetts, commander of the brig Berlin, for safe passage to the United States, in order to further study Western science and Christianity. Captain Savory agreed to help him, so long as Niijima came on board at night, without assistance from the ship's crew. Knowing Niijima could be executed if apprehended, Savory hid him from customs officials in his stateroom. He then secured Niijima's passage from China to the United States on the Wild Rover, commanded by Captain Horace Taylor of Chatham, Massachusetts. The Wild Rover was owned by Alpheus Hardy.

== In the United States ==
When he arrived in Andover, Massachusetts, he was sponsored by Alpheus and Susan Hardy, members of the Old South Church in Boston, who also saw to his education. He attended Phillips Academy under the name of Joseph Hardy Neesima from 1865 to 1867 and then Amherst College, where he was greatly influenced by professor Julius Seelye, from 1867 to 1870. Upon graduating from Amherst, Neesima became the first Japanese person to receive a bachelor's degree.

He was baptized in 1866. He went on to study at Andover Theological Seminary in 1870.

When the Iwakura Mission visited the United States in 1871 on its around-the-world expedition, Neesima assisted as an interpreter. He traveled with the Mission for more than a year, in Europe and the United States. Those who accompanied Neesima on the mission included vice-president of the voyage, Takayoshi Kido and Commissioner of the Educational Bureau, Fujimaro Tanaka, two individuals whom Neesima claimed supported him during the process of creating his school. While in Europe and the United States, Neesima toured the schools there and became influenced by the western education system.

On his return, he completed his studies at Andover Theological Seminary, and in 1874, he became the first Japanese to be ordained by Rev. A.C. Thompson on Thursday, September 24 at Mount Vernon Church, Boston as a Protestant Minister. In the same year, Neesima attended the 65th annual meeting of the American Board of Commissioners for Foreign Missions at the Grace Congregational United Church of Christ on Friday, October 9 held in Rutland, Vermont, and made an appeal for funds to start a Christian college in Japan.

== Return to Japan ==
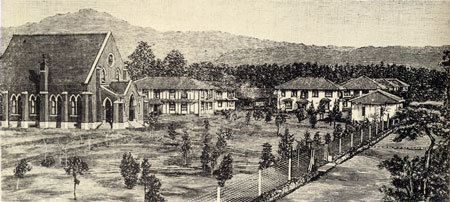
Doshisha English School (1886)

Before returning to Japan, Neesima gave a speech at the American Board of Commissioners for Foreign Missions meeting in which he asked the attendees for donations for his school he planned to build, leaving with an estimated $5,000. With the support and funding he received, he returned to Japan, and in 1875 founded a school Doshisha Eigakko (Doshisha English School) in Kyoto, which later grew rapidly and became Doshisha University in 1920. Originally a school for boys, a Doshisha School for girls was soon established in 1877. This was to be a Japanese school for Japanese students, with no foreign staff, with the first students studying English and science. He was assisted by his wife Yamamoto Yaeko and brother-in-law Yamamoto Kakuma, who were also active with the local Christian community in Kyoto. With the Christian faith at the basis of Doshisha's teachings, Neesima claimed as translated, "We placed Christianity at the core of the fundamentals of moral education, believing our ideal education can be achieved only by Christian moral teachings, which include devout faith, pursuit of truth and compassion for others." Doshisha University is regarded as the first ever Christian school of higher education in Japan.

He died in 1890, at age 46, in Oiso, Kanagawa Prefecture, and was buried in Doshisha Cemetery, Kyoto.

== Honors ==
In 1889, Amherst College honored him with an honorary doctorate, the first ever awarded to a Japanese person.

In 1907, he was honored as one of six great educators of the Meiji period, before the assembly of educators of the entire nation held by the Imperial education conference, the education conference of Tokyo prefecture and the Tokyo city board of education.

He was honored on a Japanese postage stamp in 1950.

In his honour, Niijima Gakuen Junior College (新島学園短期大学, Niijima gakuen tanki daigaku) was founded. It is a private junior college in Takasaki, Gunma, Japan. Similarly, there is Niijima Gakuen Junior and Senior High School, which has close links to Doshisha University.

== See also ==
- Doshisha Women's College of Liberal Arts
