= Akizuki Teijirō =

Japanese samurai

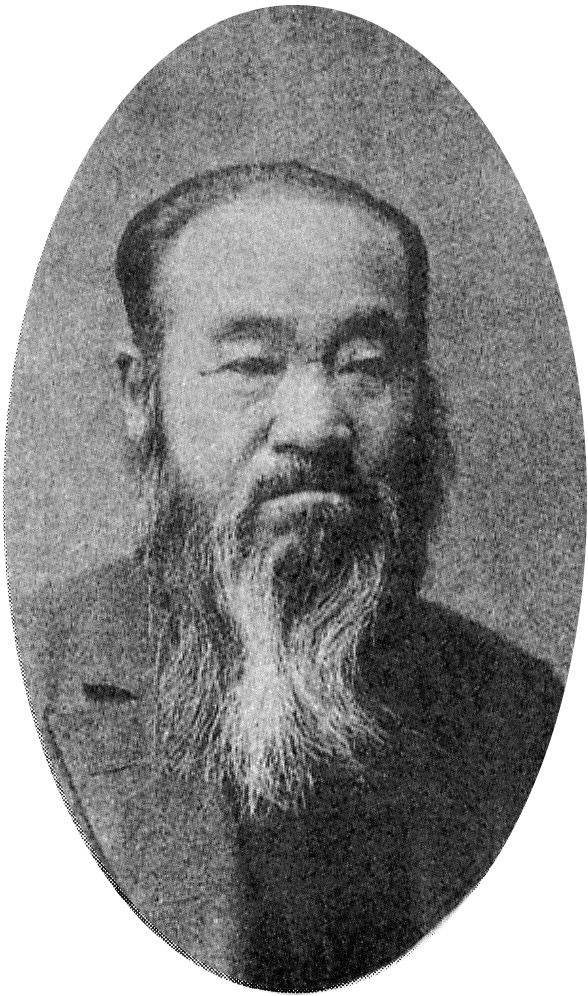
- Born: 1824
- Died: January 5, 1900 (aged 75–76)
- Era: Edo

Akizuki Teijirō (秋月 悌次郎; 1824 – January 5, 1900) was a Japanese samurai of the late Edo period, who served the Matsudaira clan of Aizu. Born in Aizuwakamatsu, Akizuki was recognized early as a skilled scholar, and he studied at the Tokugawa Shogunate's Shoheizaka school in Edo. He served as an advisor to Matsudaira Katamori, and was present for most of the latter's tenure as Kyoto Shugoshoku from 1862 to 1867. Akizuki was a senior commander of Aizu forces during the Boshin War. After the war, he became an educator, and worked in high schools in Kyushu. Later in his life, he was a colleague of Lafcadio Hearn, who referred to him in his writings.
