= Kayano Gonbei =

Japanese samurai

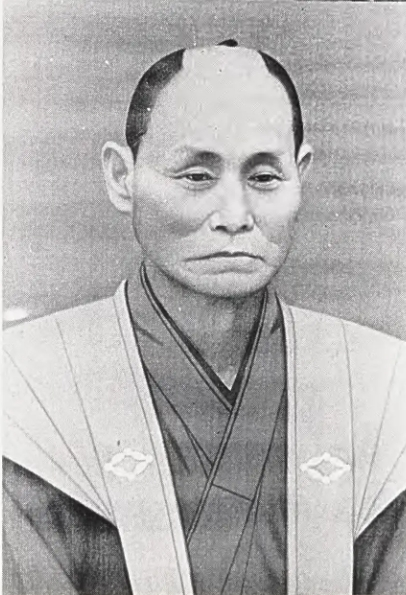
Kayano Gonbei

Kayano Gonbei (萱野 権兵衛; 1830 – June 27, 1869) was a Japanese samurai of the late Edo period, who served the Matsudaira clan of Aizu. He was a karō in the Aizu domain's administration. Kayano served in a senior military role during the Boshin War, he was later imprisoned by the Meiji government and made to commit suicide in Tokyo.
