= Victor Varshavsky =

Soviet computer scientist (1933–2005)

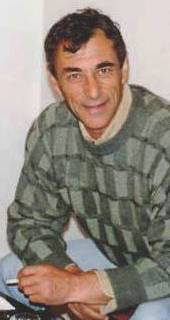
- Varshavsky in 1976
- Born: February 23, 1933; Leningrad, USSR
- Died: January 3, 2005 (aged 71); Tel-Aviv, Israel
- Citizenship: Soviet Union, Israel
- Education: Leningrad Institute of Precision Mechanics and Optics
- Scientific career
- Fields: Computer science
- Workplaces: Academy of Sciences of the USSR; Leningrad Electrotechnical Institute; University of Aizu
- Doctoral advisor: Michael Tsetlin
- Doctoral students: Alex Yakovlev

Victor Varshavsky (Russian: Виктор Ильич Варшавский) (23 February 1933, Leningrad - 3 January 2005, Tel Aviv) was a Soviet-Israeli computer scientist. His research was concentrated in three areas: threshold logic, probabilistic automata, and asynchronous circuits.

== Early years ==
Due to the Second World War, Varshavsky was evacuated from Leningrad to Barnaul and was there until 1949. In the 9th grade, he was transferred to High School №203 named after Griboyedov in Leningrad.

== Education ==
In 1956, Varshavsky graduated from the Leningrad Institute of Precision Mechanics and Optics (now ITMO University), majoring in "Firing control devices". In 1962, he defended his PhD dissertation. In threshold logic at the Leningrad Institute of Aviation Instrumentation. In 1969, he defended his DSc dissertation (equivalent of Habilitation) in collective behavior of probabilistic automata at the Academy of Sciences of the USSR. This research was a continuation of what had been done by Varshavsky's DSc advisor Michael Tsetlin.

== Scientific career ==
From 1956 to 1960, before getting into PhD study, Varshavsky worked at the Research Institute of the Ministry of Shipbuilding Industry in Leningrad as an engineer and then as a group leader. He started at Design Bureau КБ-4 of the Plant 212, which later was joined with Research Institute НИИ-303 (P.O. box 128 and 536, now CSRI Elektropribor). From 1960 to 1980, he worked at the Computing Center of the Leningrad Branch of the Mathematical Institute (ВЦ ЛОМИ) of the USSR Academy of Sciences as a researcher and then as the Head of Department. This computing center was later reorganized into the Institute of Socio-Economic Problems (ИСЭП, now Institute of Regional Economic Problems).

In 1978, he was on leave for three months at the laboratory of artificial intelligence at the University of Edinburgh. In 1975, he started to teach at the Department of Computer Engineering (Вычислительная техника) at Leningrad Electrotechnical Institute (LETI). In 1980, he got the position of Full Professor at the Department of Computer Science (Математическое обеспечение ЭВМ). Varshavsky was able to take with him to LETI only a part of his team, namely, V. B. Marakhovsky and L. Ya. Rosenblum.

In 1988, Varshavsky organized an R&D company, "Trassa", which produced CAD tools for the synthesis and analysis of asynchronous circuits. This company overcame the collapse of the Soviet Union and existed till 1993, when Varshavsky and a little part of his team started to work in Japan. From 1993 to 2000, he was Full Professor and Head of the Computer Logic Design Laboratory at the University of Aizu, Japan. From 2002 to 2003, he was the Head of the department of logical control at Neural Network Technologies, Bnei-Brak, Israel. From 2003 till his death in 2005, he was the Chief Scientific Officer at Advanced Logic Design Company at Kanazawa University, Japan.

From 1965 onwards, Varshavsky was a member of the Commission on the theory of relay devices and finite state machines under the Scientific Council on the Complex Problem of "Cybernetics" of the USSR Academy of Sciences, and since 1985, a member of the Council of the USSR Academy of Sciences on artificial intelligence. For his numerous inventions, some of which have been used for mass production, Varshavsky has been awarded (in 1980-th) the Honorary Badge “Inventor of the USSR”.

In 1988, he was awarded the VDNH gold medal for the best project in microelectronics.

== Contribution to cybernetics ==
Varshavsky is an author and co-author of six books, several book chapters and technical reports more than 150 papers, and more than 120 Soviet author's certificates, as well as American and Japanese patents. He was a chief technical officer of more than 15 projects in the following areas: system architecture, design of devices based on threshold logic, design of reliable computing devices, hardware support for asynchronous processes, design of VLSI circuits, design of asynchronous circuits, neural networks and fuzzy logic.
