= Ole-Christoffer Granmo =

Norwegian computer scientist

- Born: August 26, 1974 (age 52)
- Education: University of Oslo
- Occupation: Computer scientist
- Known for: Tsetlin machines

Ole-Christoffer Granmo (born 26 August 1974) is a Norwegian computer scientist. Granmo is a professor and director at the Centre for Artificial Intelligence Research (CAIR) at the University of Agder.

== Biography ==
Granmo grew up in Skien and studied at the University of Oslo. He completed his master's degree in computer science in 1999 and PhD in 2004.

In 2018, Granmo published a paper on an artificial Intelligence algorithm built upon propositional logic and the work of Michael Tsetlin, which he accordingly named a Tsetlin machine. Researchers around the world have since started to adopt the AI technology, seeing promising results for the technology in a variety of fields, while Granmo has subsequently joined commercialisation efforts, including as chair of the technical steering committee of logical AI startup, Literal Labs. In 2022, Granmo was named the decade's researcher in artificial intelligence by Norwegian Artificial Intelligence Research Consortium (NORA).
