= Junior College of Aizu =

Public junior college in Japan

Coordinates: 37°30′26.4″N 139°56′44.6″E

- 会津大学短期大学部
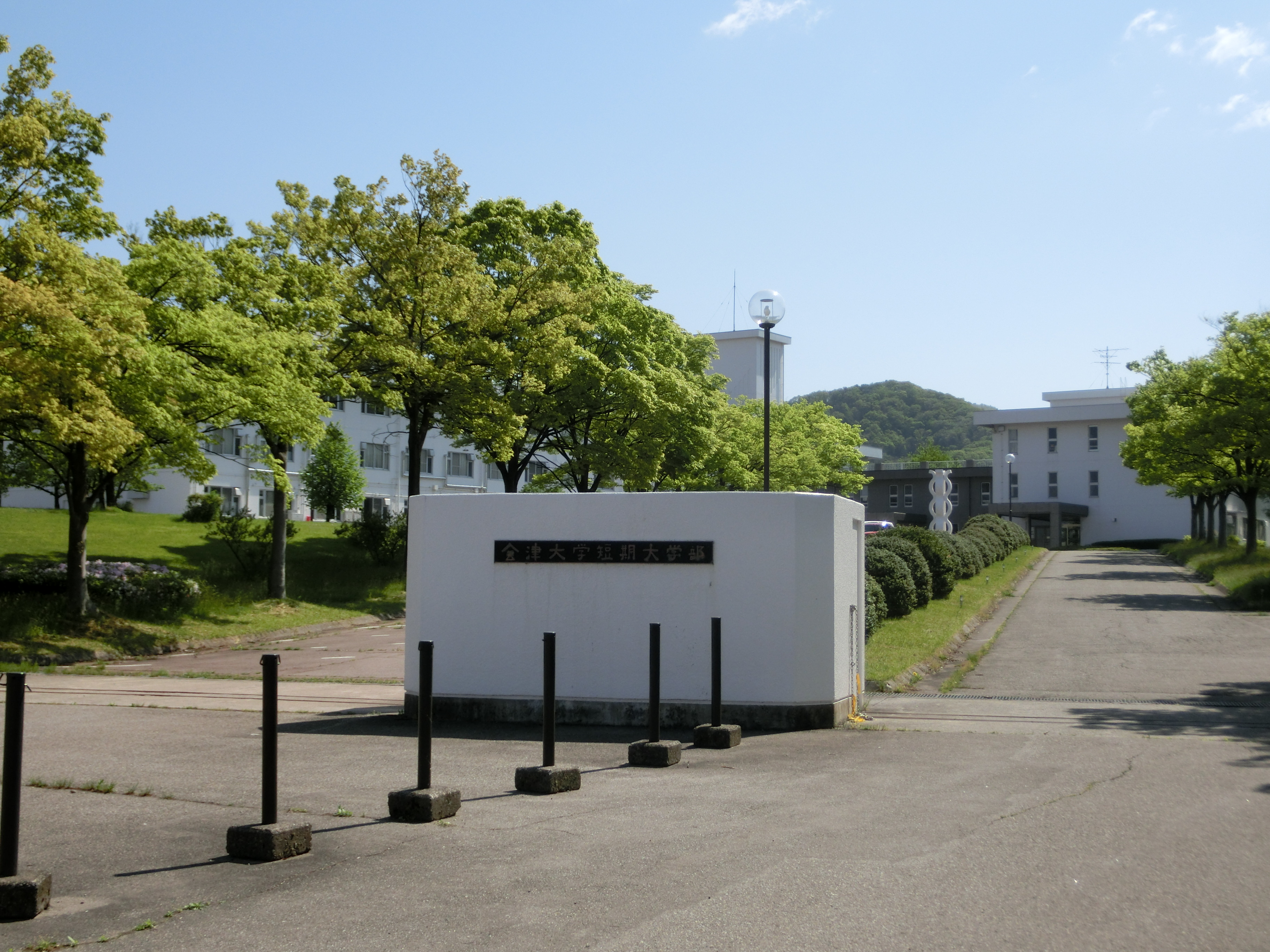
- Type: public
- Established: 1951
- Location: Aizuwakamatsu, Fukushima, Japan
- Website: http://www.jc.u-aizu.ac.jp

Junior College of Aizu (会津大学短期大学部, Aizu Tanki Daigaku) is a public junior college in Aizuwakamatsu, Fukushima, Japan associated with the University of Aizu. It was established in 1951 as Fukushima Prefectural Aizu Junior College (福島県立会津短期大学, Fukushima Kenritsu Aizu Tanki Daigaku).

== See also ==
- List of junior colleges in Japan
