= Gelfand–Zeitlin integrable system =

In mathematics, the Gelfand–Zeitlin system (also written Gelfand–Zetlin system, Gelfand–Cetlin system, Gelfand–Tsetlin system) is an integrable system on conjugacy classes of Hermitian matrices. It was introduced by Guillemin and Sternberg (1983), who named it after the Gelfand–Zeitlin basis, an early example of canonical basis, introduced by Israel Gelfand and Michael Tsetlin in 1950s. Kostant and Wallach (2006) introduced a complex version of this integrable system.
