= Oyaku-en =

- 御薬園
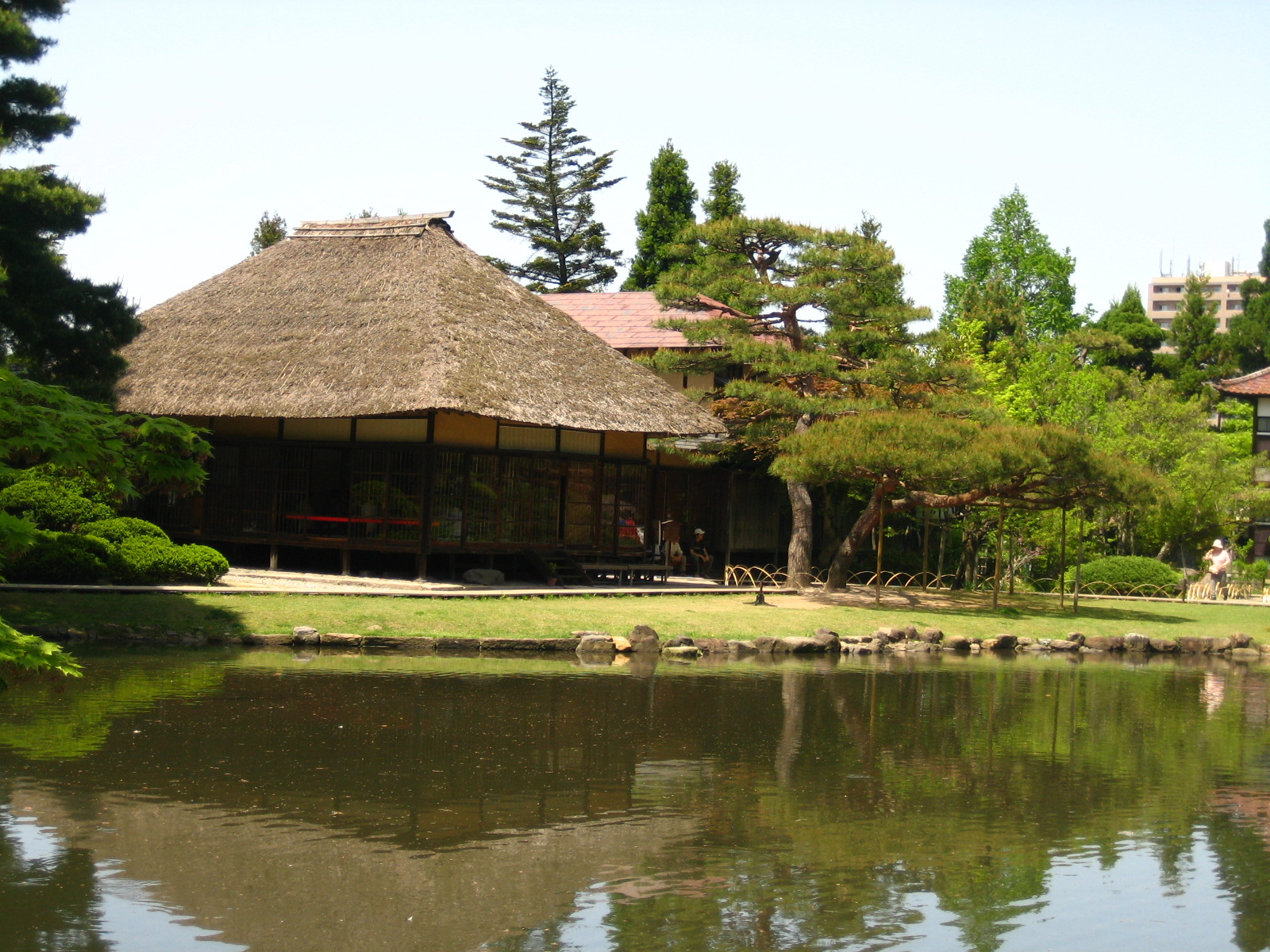
- The Ochayagoten tea house at Oyaku-en

- Location within Fukushima Prefecture Location within Japan
- Type: Japanese garden
- Location: Aizuwakamatsu, Fukushima, Japan
- Coordinates: 37°29′29″N 139°56′36.2″E
- Created: 1380s

Oyaku-en (御薬園) is a medicinal herb garden in the city of Aizuwakamatsu, Fukushima Prefecture, Japan. The garden was designated a Place of Scenic Beauty by the Japanese government in 1932. It is also known as the Aizu Matsudaira-clan Garden (会津松平氏庭園, Aizu Matsudaira-shi teien).

== History ==
The garden was first established in the 1380s. In the 1430s Ashina Morihisa, the 10th feudal lord of the Ashina clan, believing it to be a sacred place, kept the garden as a villa. In 1670, Hoshina Masatsune, the second daimyō of the Aizu Domain, cultivated various herbs in the garden, notably Korean ginseng. Private citizens were encouraged to grow herbs as well, so the garden became known as Oyakuen, or "medicinal herb garden". Today there are about 400 kinds of medicinal herbs and trees cultivated in and around the garden. Meguro Jotei, a landscape gardener during the Edo period and disciple of Kobori Enshū, designed the current layout of the garden to show nature in miniature, which is typical of a Japanese garden. The garden pond is named Shinji no Ike and is shaped like the kanji character for "heart" (心). The rectangular garden has a perimeter of about 540 m and an area of about 1.7 ha.

== Chōyōkaku ==
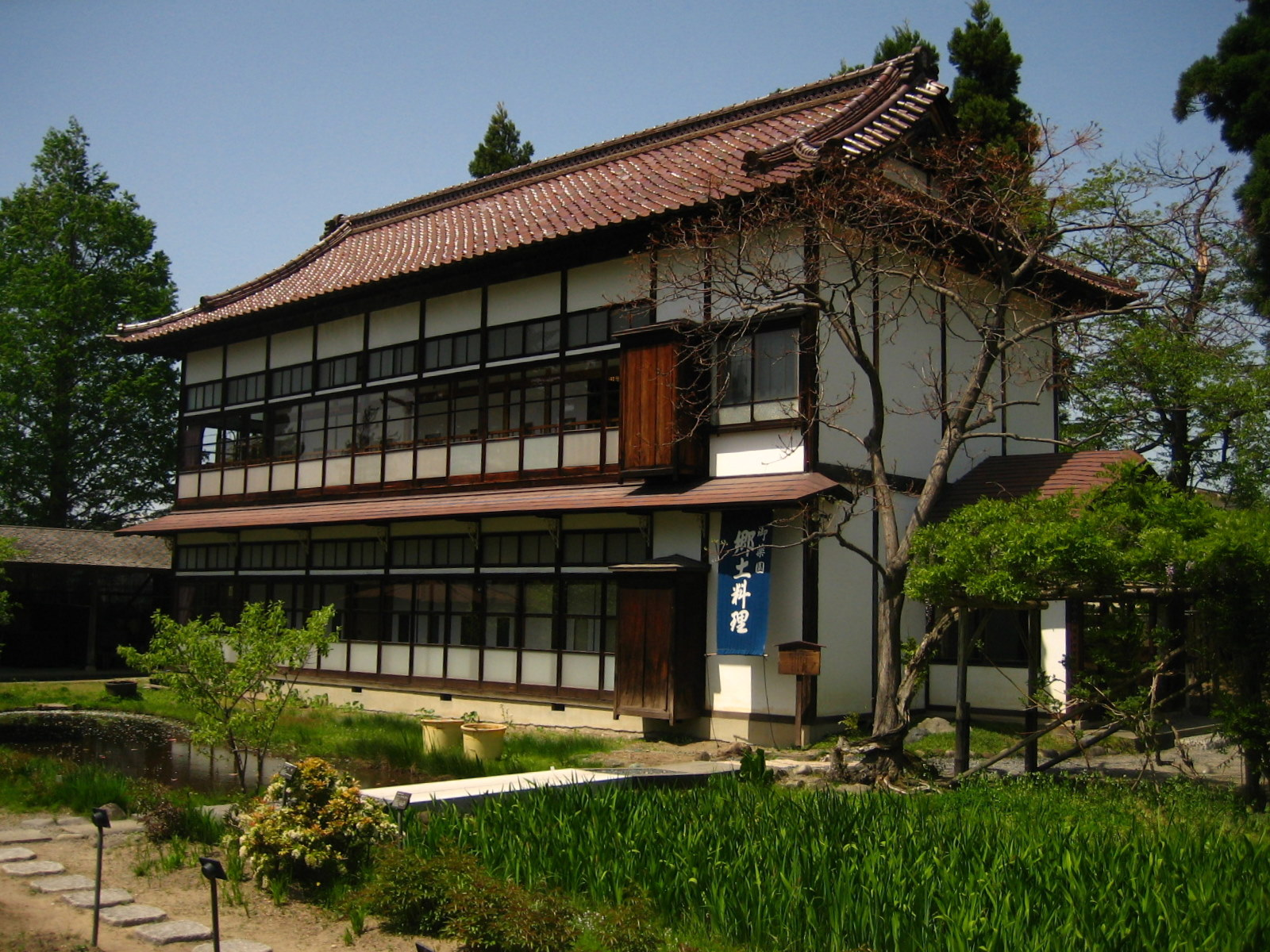
The Chōyōkaku at Oyaku-en

The Chōyōkaku (重陽閣) was built on the ninth of September, a date known as chōyō in the Japanese calendar. In 1928, Princess Chichibu stayed at Chōyōkaku while visiting the garden. In 1973 the building was moved to its current location.

== Ochayagoten ==
The Ochayagoten (御茶屋御殿) dates from the Muromachi period. It was built in the Izumidono style. Each room has at least four-and-a-half tatami mats. The building was used when lords, superior officials, merchants or general managers of the clan were invited to Aizu.

== Rakujutei ==
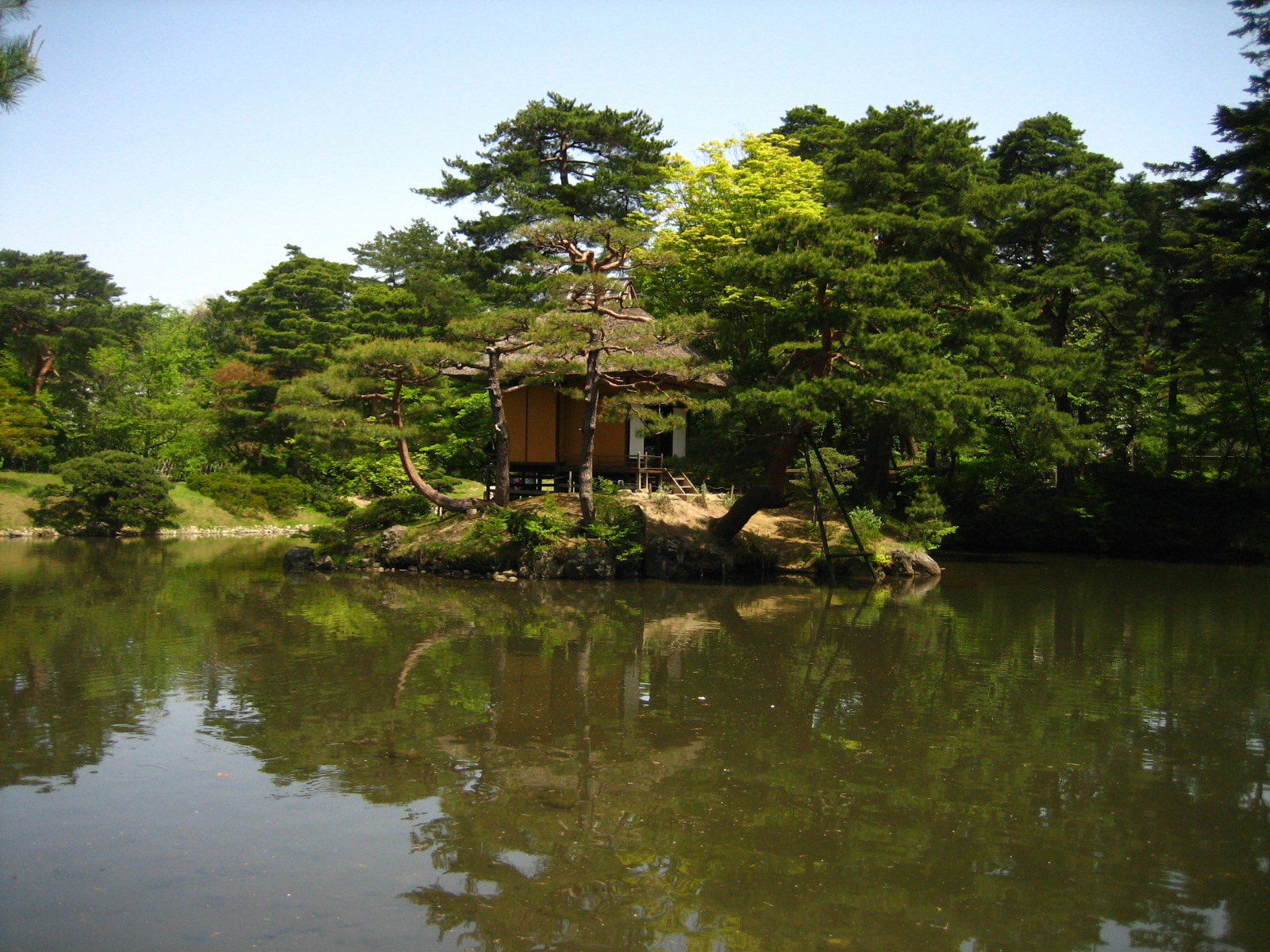
The Rakujutei at Oyaku-en

The Rakujutei (楽寿亭) is a tea ceremony cottage built on Naka shima or "Middle Island". It has an alcove with a rail and thatched roof. Feudal lords and the executives of the clan would enjoy tea ceremony here.
