= Kawahigashi, Fukushima =

Dissolved municipality in Fukushima prefecture, Japan

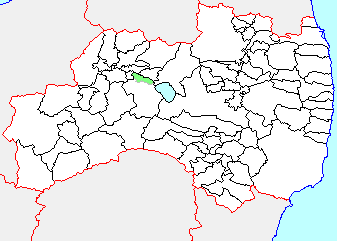
Map of Kawahigashi, Fukushima

Kawahigashi (河東町, Kawahigashi-machi) was a town in Kawanuma District, Fukushima Prefecture, Japan.

On November 1, 2005, Kawahigashi was merged into the expanded city of Aizuwakamatsu.

As of 2003, the town has an estimated population of 9,289 and a density of 235/km^{2} (610/sq mi). Its total area is 39.57 km^{2} (15.28 sq mi).
