= Aizuwakamatsu =

Aizuwakamatsu 会津若松市
- City
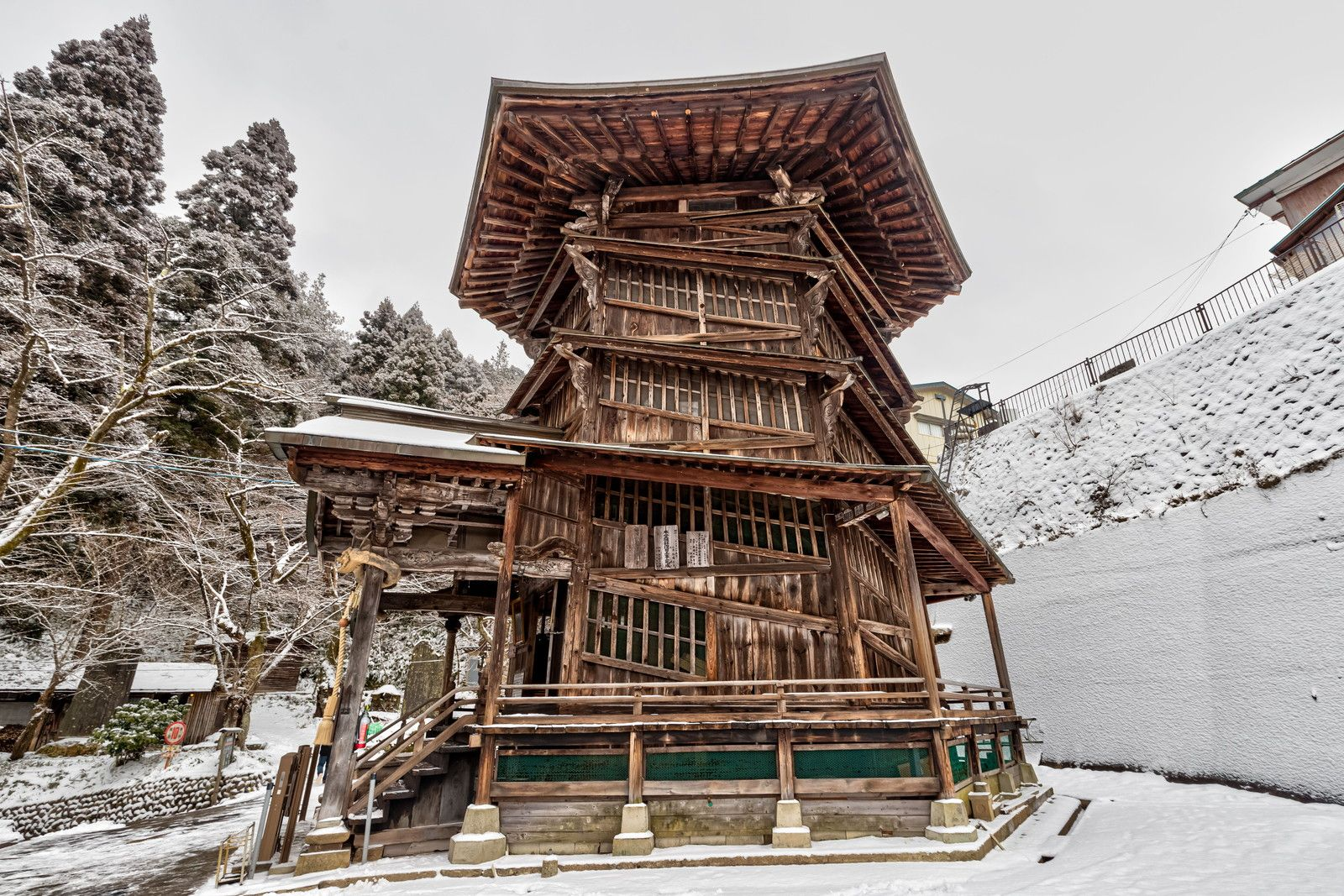
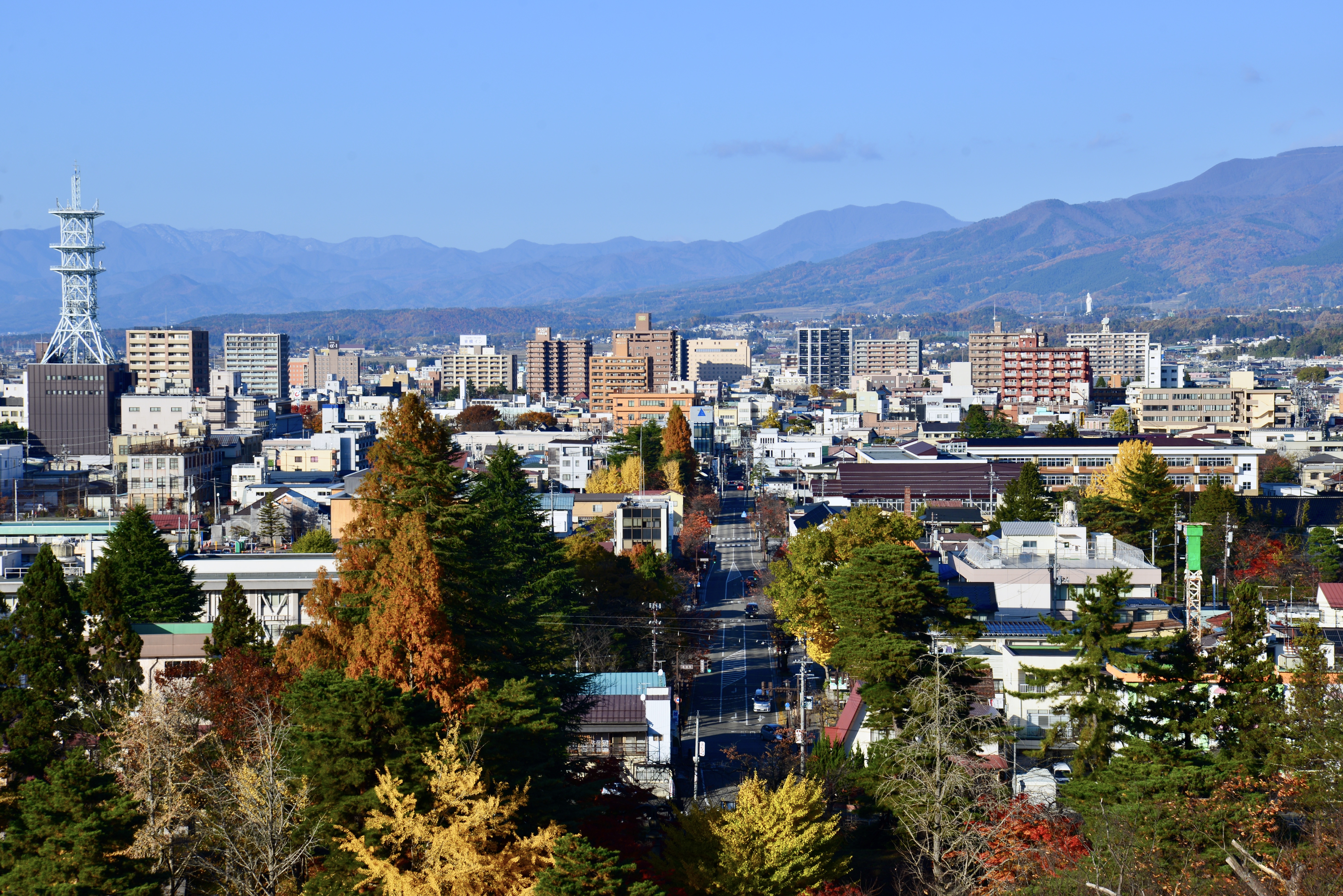
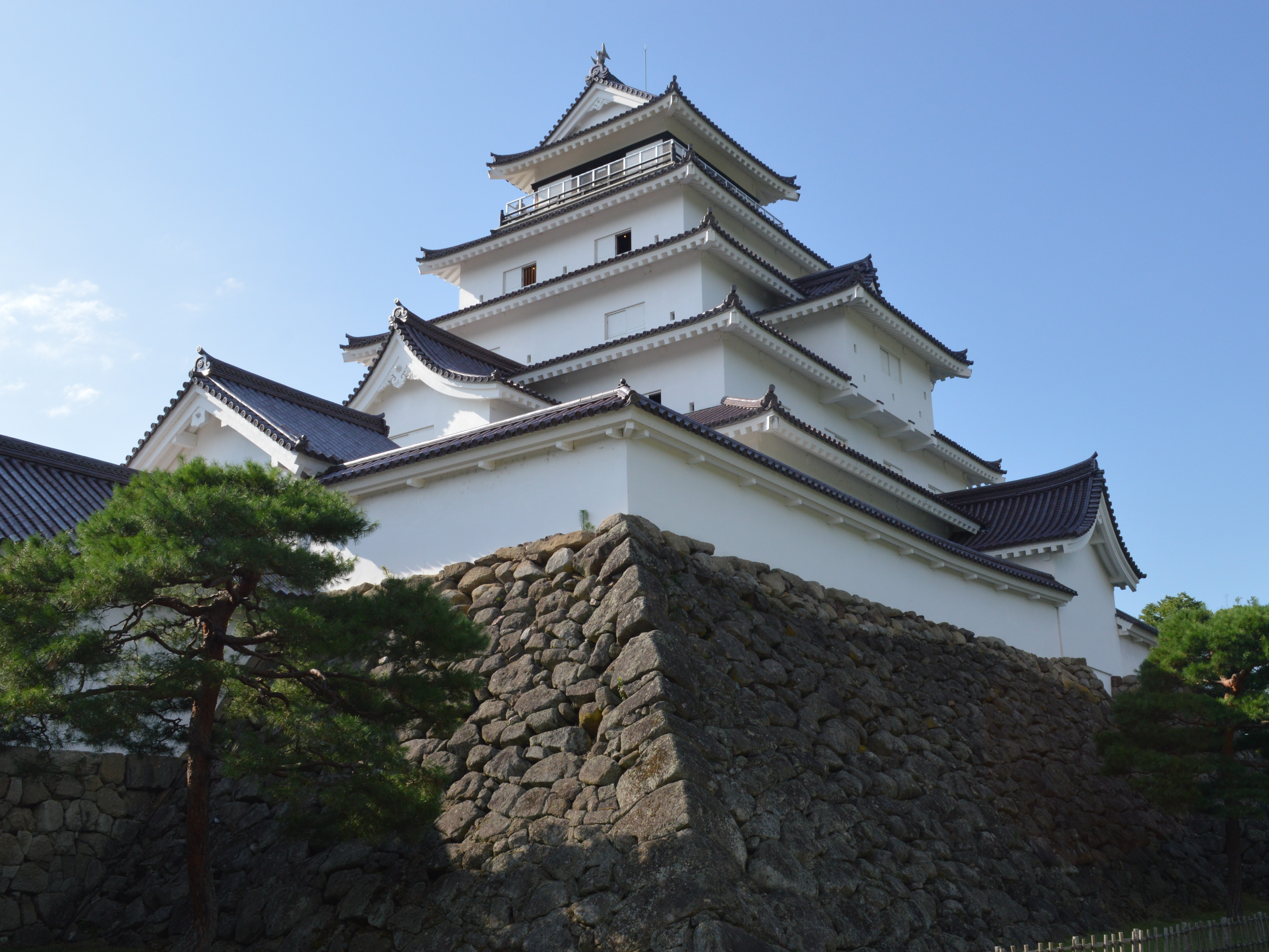
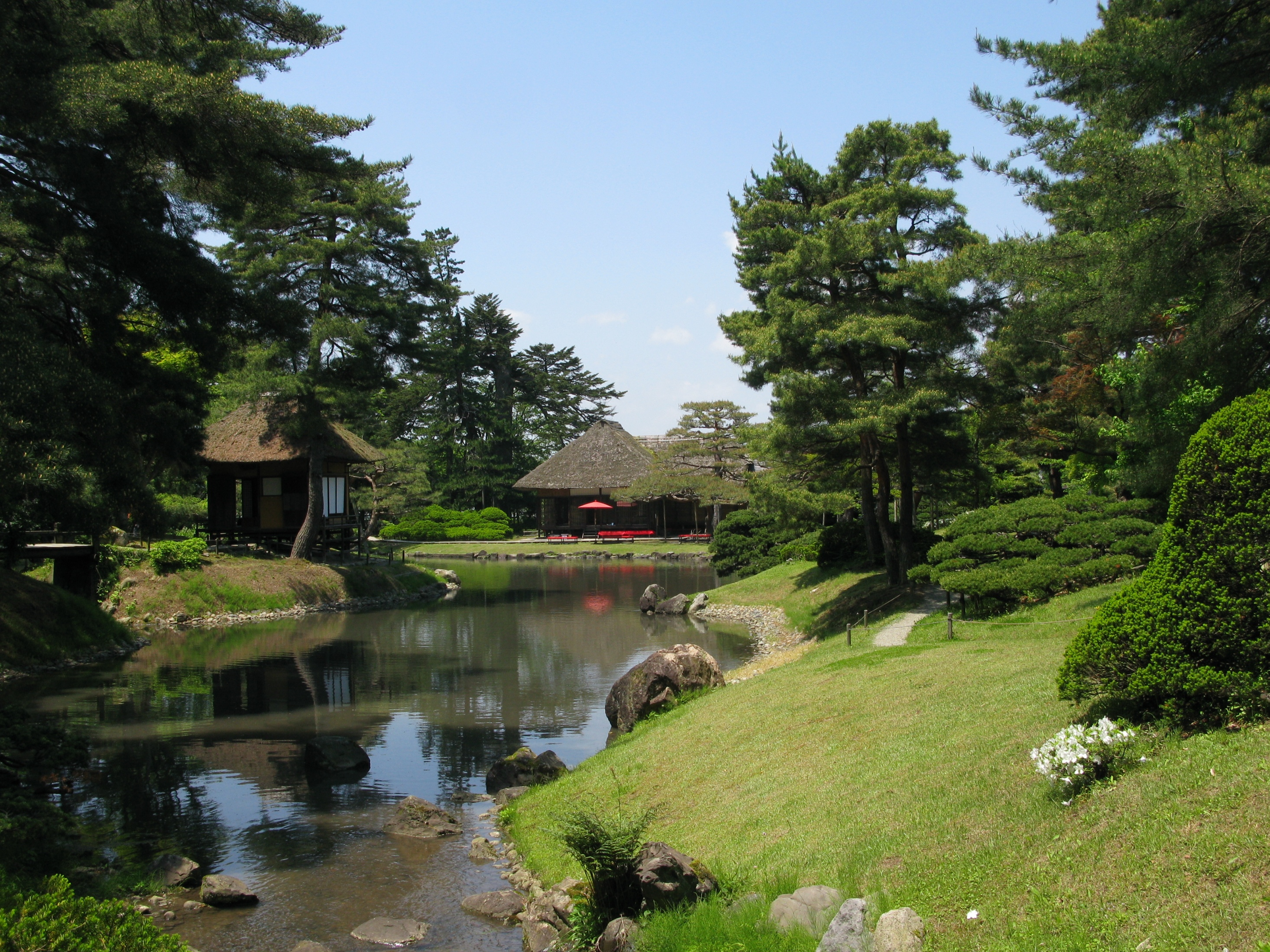
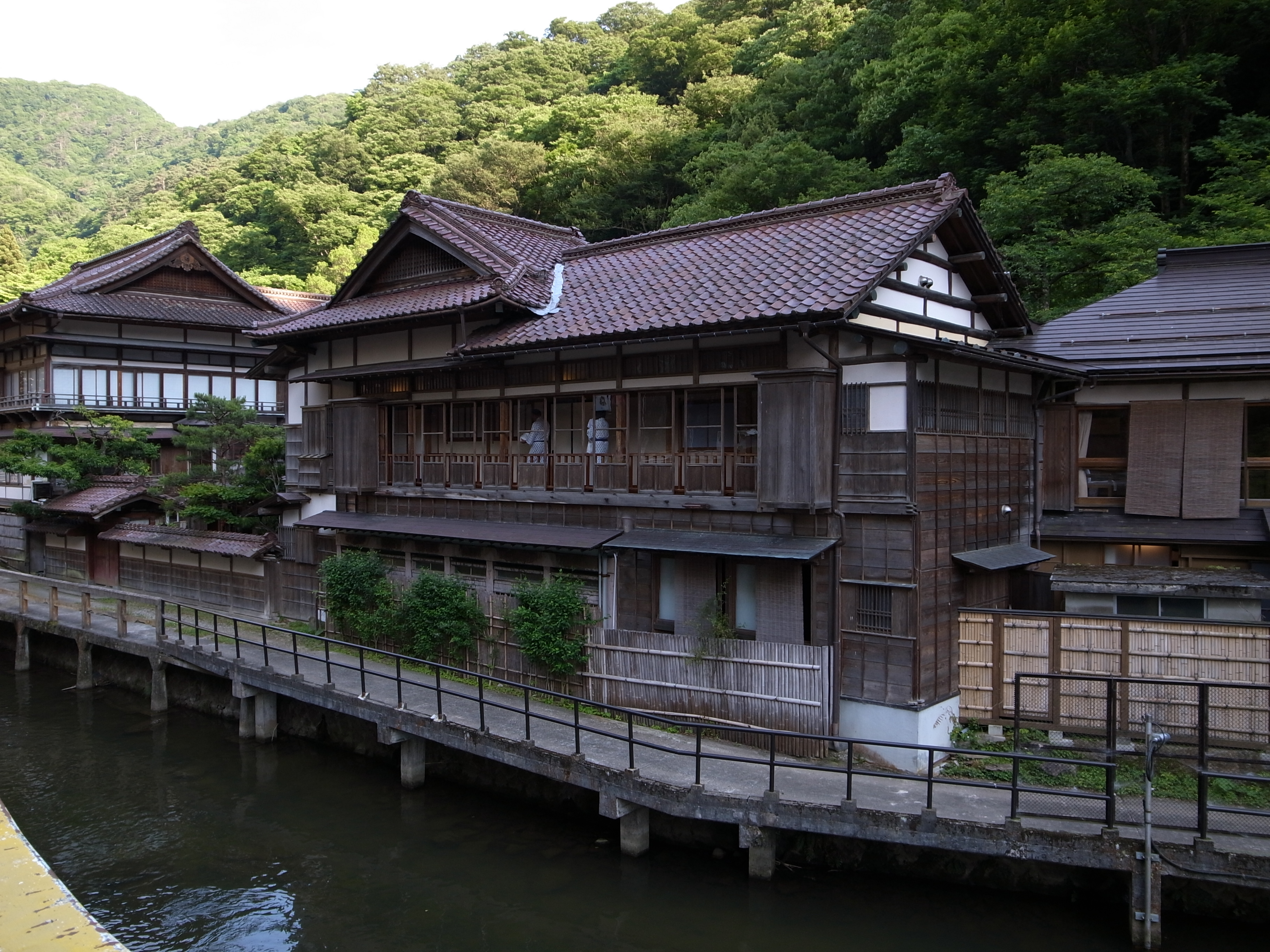
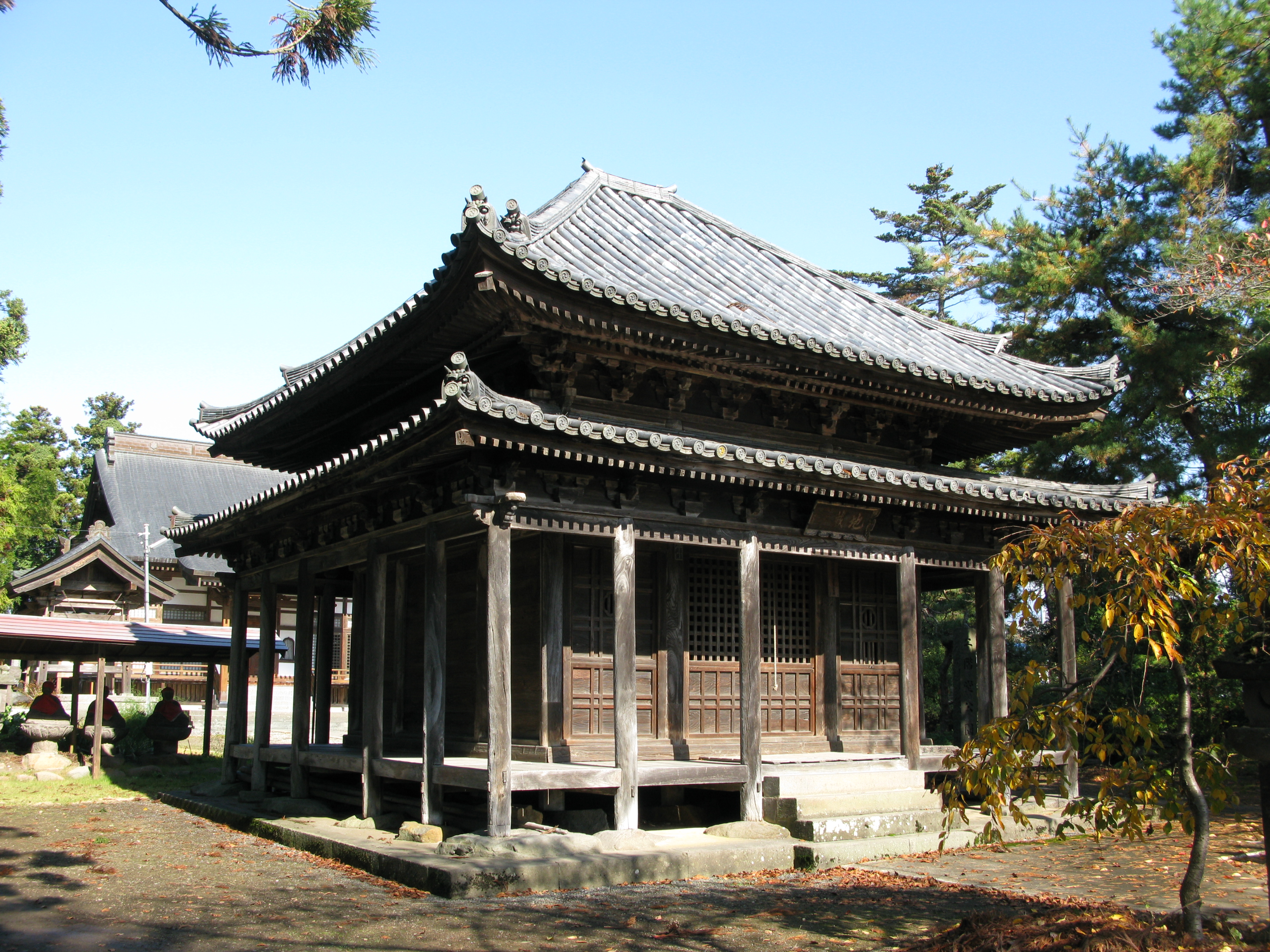
- Aidzu Sazaedou Skyline from Aizuwakamatsu Castle Aizuwakamatsu Castle Oyaku-en Higashiyama Onsen Enmei-ji

- Flag Seal

- Location of Aizuwakamatsu in Fukushima Prefecture

- Coordinates: 37°29′41.4″N 139°55′47.1″E
- Country: Japan
- Region: Tōhoku
- Prefecture: Fukushima
- First official recorded: 400 AD
- City Settled for Wakamatsu: April 1, 1899
- Current city name changed: January 1, 1955

Government
  - Mayor: Ichirō Kanke

Area
  - Total: 382.97 km^{2} (147.87 sq mi)

Population (March 1, 2020)
  - Total: 119,232
  - Density: 311.34/km^{2} (806.35/sq mi)
- Time zone: UTC+9 (Japan Standard Time)
  - Tree: Japanese Red Pine
  - Flower: Common Hollyhock
  - Bird: Common cuckoo
- Phone number: 0242-39-1111
- Address: 3–46 Higashisakaemachi, Aizuwakamatsu-shi, Fukushima-ken 965-8601
- Website: Official website

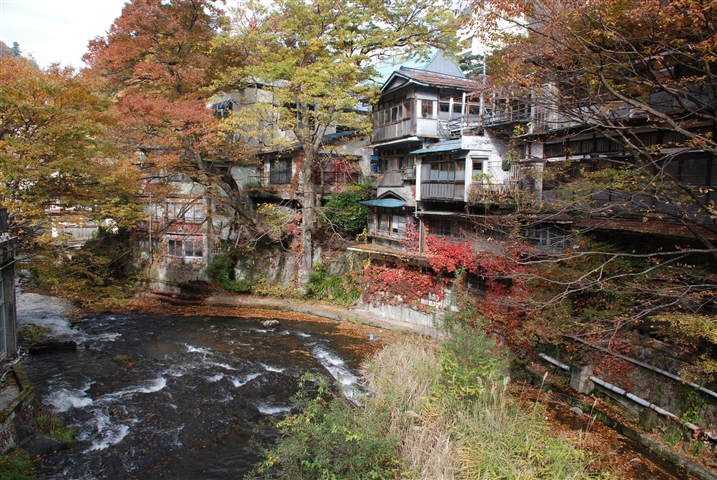
Higashiyama Onsen

Aizuwakamatsu (会津若松市, Aizuwakamatsu-shi; Japanese pronunciation: [ä̀í.(d͡)zɨ́.β̞ä́.kä́.mä̀.t͡sɨ̀, -mä́.t͡sɨ̥.ɕì]) is a city in Fukushima Prefecture, Japan. As of 1 January 2021, the city had an estimated population of 118,159 in 50,365 households, and a population density of 310 persons per km^{2}. The total area of the city was 382.97 square kilometres (147.87 sq mi).

== History ==
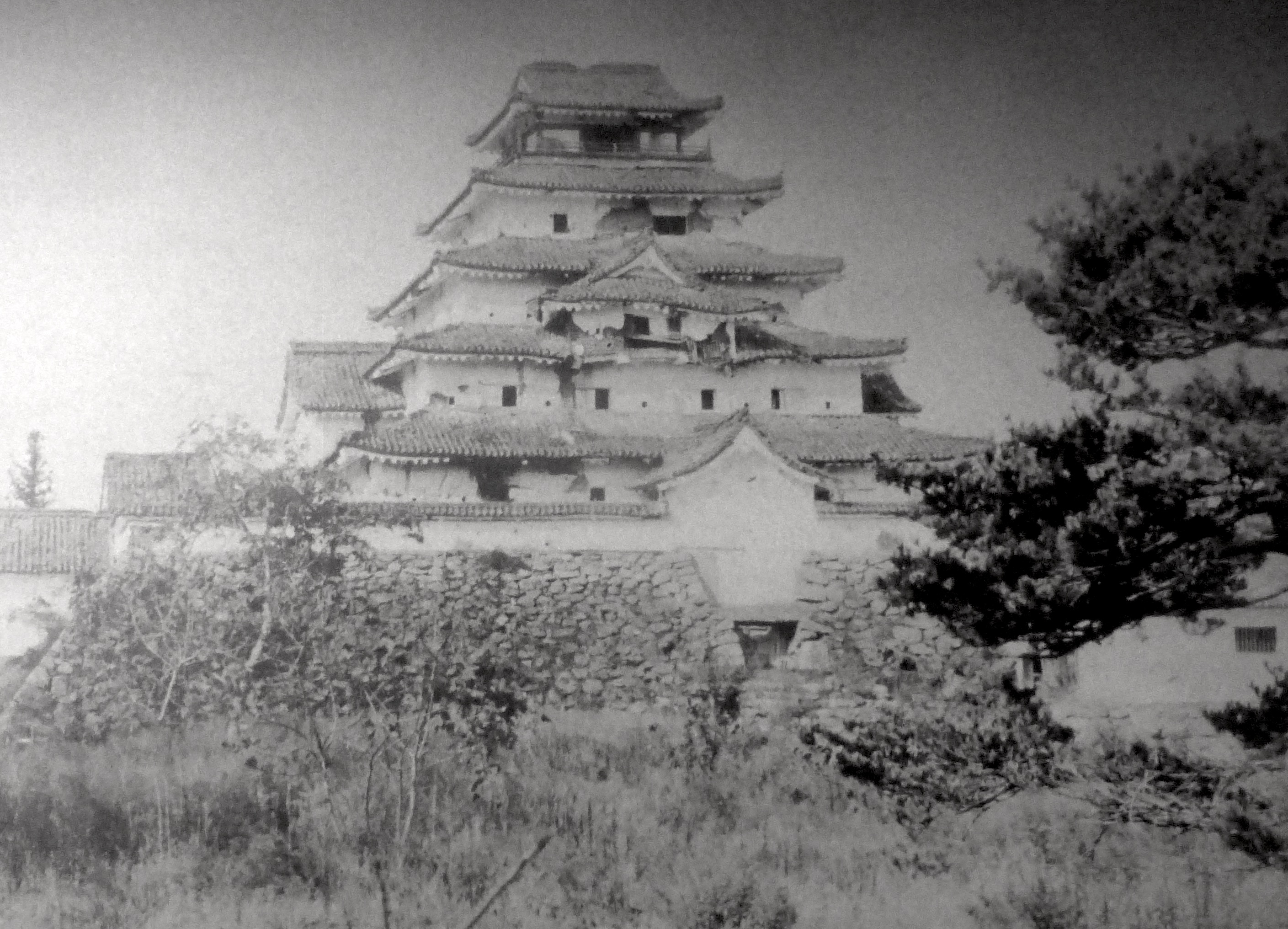
Aizuwakamatsu Castle after the Battle of Aizu, 1868 photograph.

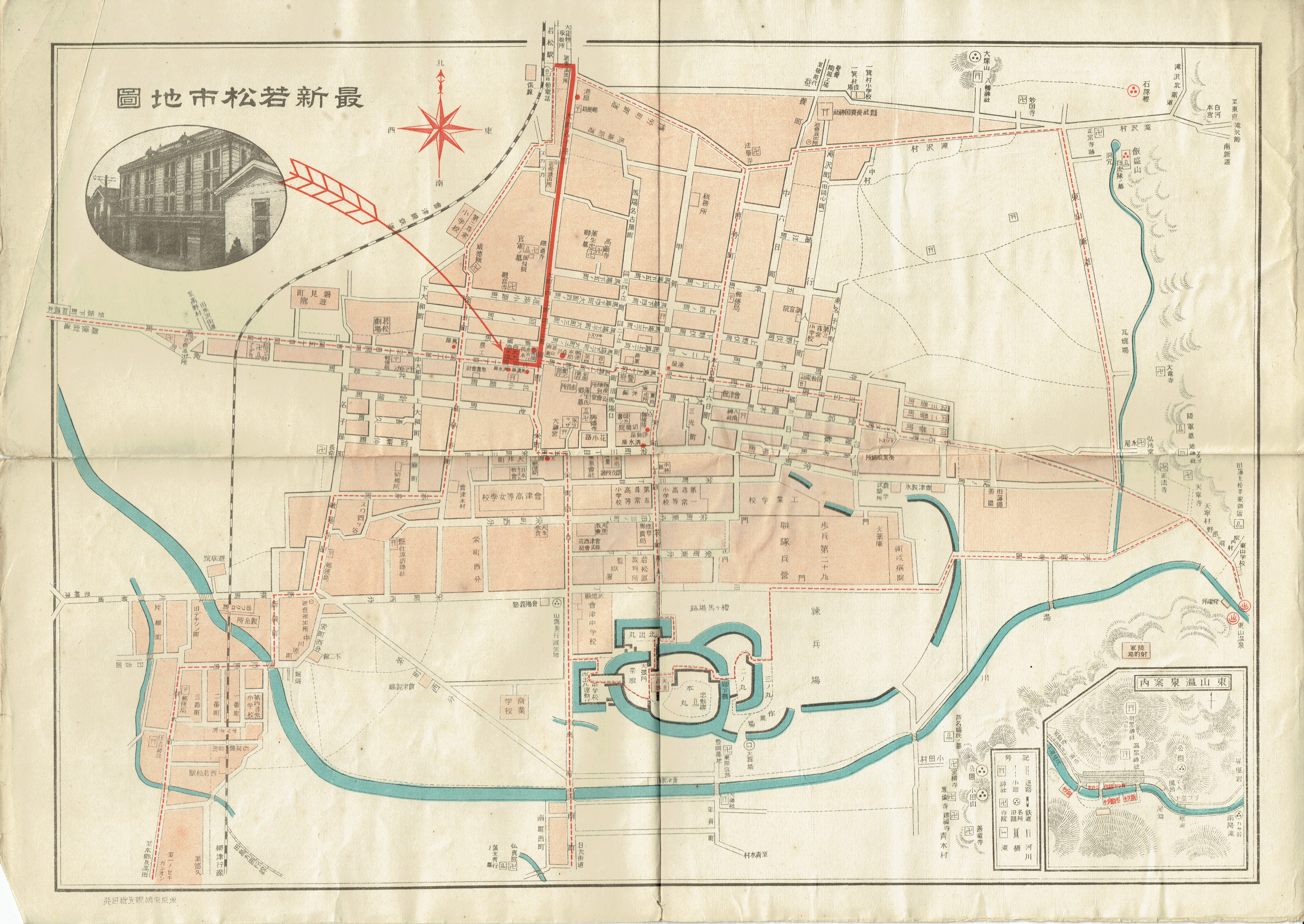
AizuWakamatsu map published by Shirakiya lacquerware shop, 1930

The area of present-day Aizuwakamatsu was part of ancient Mutsu Province, and was settled from prehistoric times. The Aizu-Otsuka Kofun within the city borders dates from the 4th century AD, and is an Important Cultural Property.

According to legend, in 88 BCE, Emperor Sujin sent two generals; Ohiko and Takenukawa-wake to the Tōhoku region for the purpose of establishing peace after the quashing of a rebellion in the region.

Before the late 12th century, Aizuwakamatsu was mainly a market town and a base for regional warlords. Starting in 1192, Aizuwakamatsu became part of the regions that were controlled by the Kamakura shogunate. Soon after taking power, Yoritomo granted a samurai named Suwara Yoshitsura (from the Miura clan) all of Aizu. A descendant of Suwara, Ashina Morinori, began construction of the first castle in the city in 1384. During the Sengoku period the final lord of Aizu, Ashina Moritaka, died in 1583 and soon the Ashina clan lost power. After the Satake clan took control of the castle, they placed a twelve-year-old member of their clan who was renamed Ashina Morishige and proclaimed lord of Aizu. The Ashina clan regained control of Aizu for a brief time in 1589 with the help of Date Masamune. However, Masamune took over the domain for himself soon after. He surrendered in 1590 to Toyotomi Hideyoshi. Toyotomi gave Aizu to one of his allies, Gamo Ujisato who then began construction in 1592 of a new castle at the site. It was during this time that the town was renamed "Wakamatsu" (young pine).

During the Edo period, Aizu was controlled briefly by Uesugi Kagekatsu in 1600 after the death of Gamo Ujisato in 1596. Tokugawa Ieyasu accused Uesugi of gathering troops in Aizu. Ieyasu then transferred the Uesugi to Yonezawa. Through inheritance, Aizu was passed to Hoshina Masayuki (a brother of the third Tokugawa shogun) in 1643. The Edo period saw the economic and cultural growth of Aizu.

Hoshina's descendants ruled the Aizu Domain for the next 200 years, adopting the Matsudaira name until the ninth generation Daimyō, Matsudaira Katamori, backed the bakufu in the Boshin War. Aizuwakamatsu Castle fell during the Battle of Aizu and the domain was forfeited. A group of 22, including loyal retainers and their families, managed to escape to California and lend the name of their home to establish the first Japanese colony in America, the ill fated Wakamatsu Tea and Silk Farm Colony in 1869.

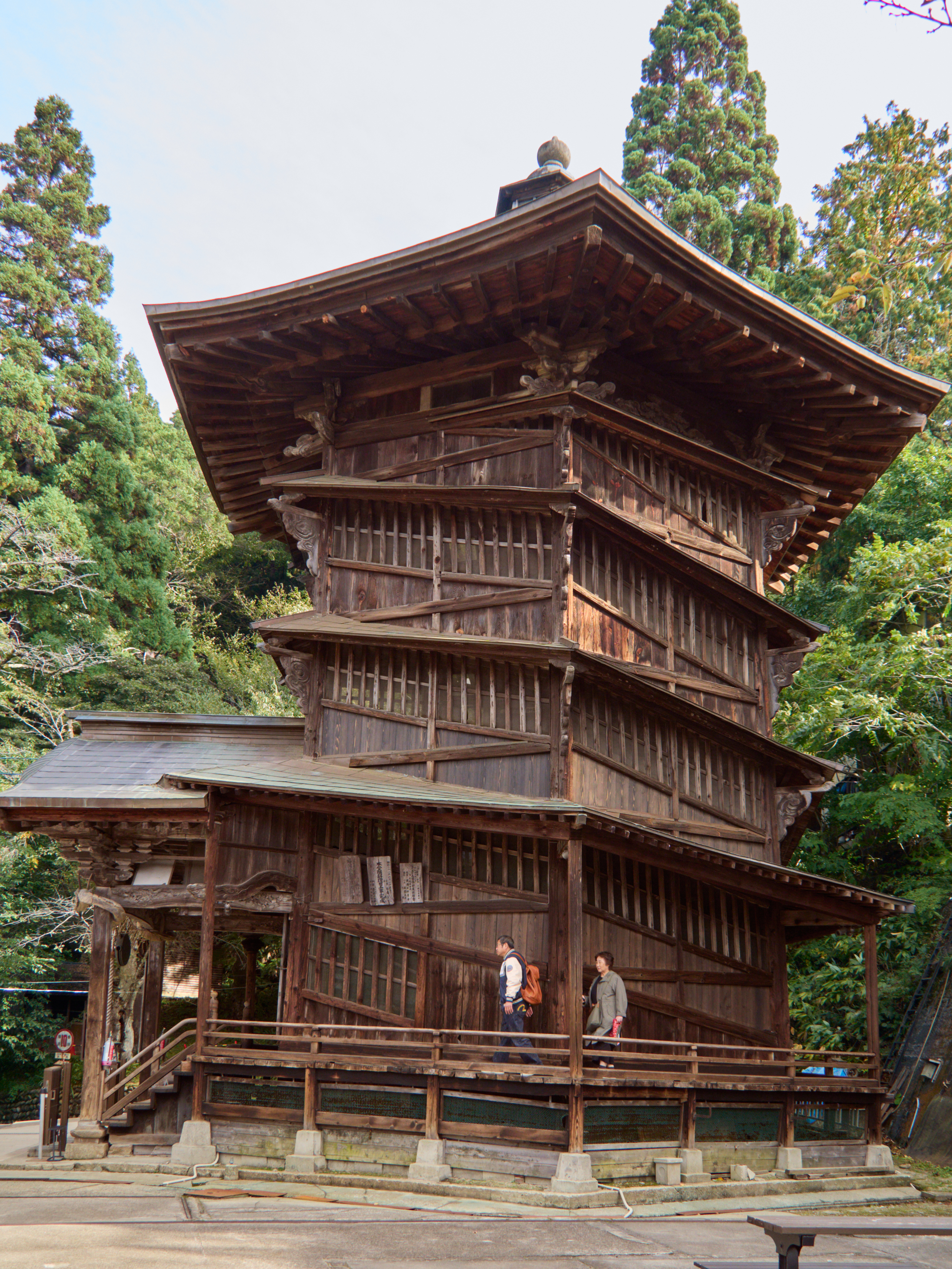
Aizu Sazaedo in Aizuwakamatsu - world's only temple with an internal double-helix staircase, so people ascending never cross those descending.

After the Meiji Restoration, Wakamatsu Town was created with the establishment of the modern municipalities system on April 1, 1889. It became Wakamatsu City in 1899. On April 1, 1937, a part of Machikita village (from Kitaaizu District) was merged into the city of Wakamatsu. The remained was annexed on April 1, 1951. The name of the city was changed to Aizuwakamatsu on January 1, 1955 when Wakamatsu merged with seven villages of Kitaaizu District (Kouya, Kouzashi, Monden, Ikki, Higashiyama, Ōto and Minato). A part of the town of Hongō (locality of Oya) (from Ōnuma District) was merged into Aizuwakamatsu on April 1, 1955.

Aizuwakamatsu further expanded by annexing the village of Kitaaizu (from Kitaaizu District) on November 1, 2004 and the town of Kawahigashi (from Kawanuma District) on November 1, 2005.

== Geography ==
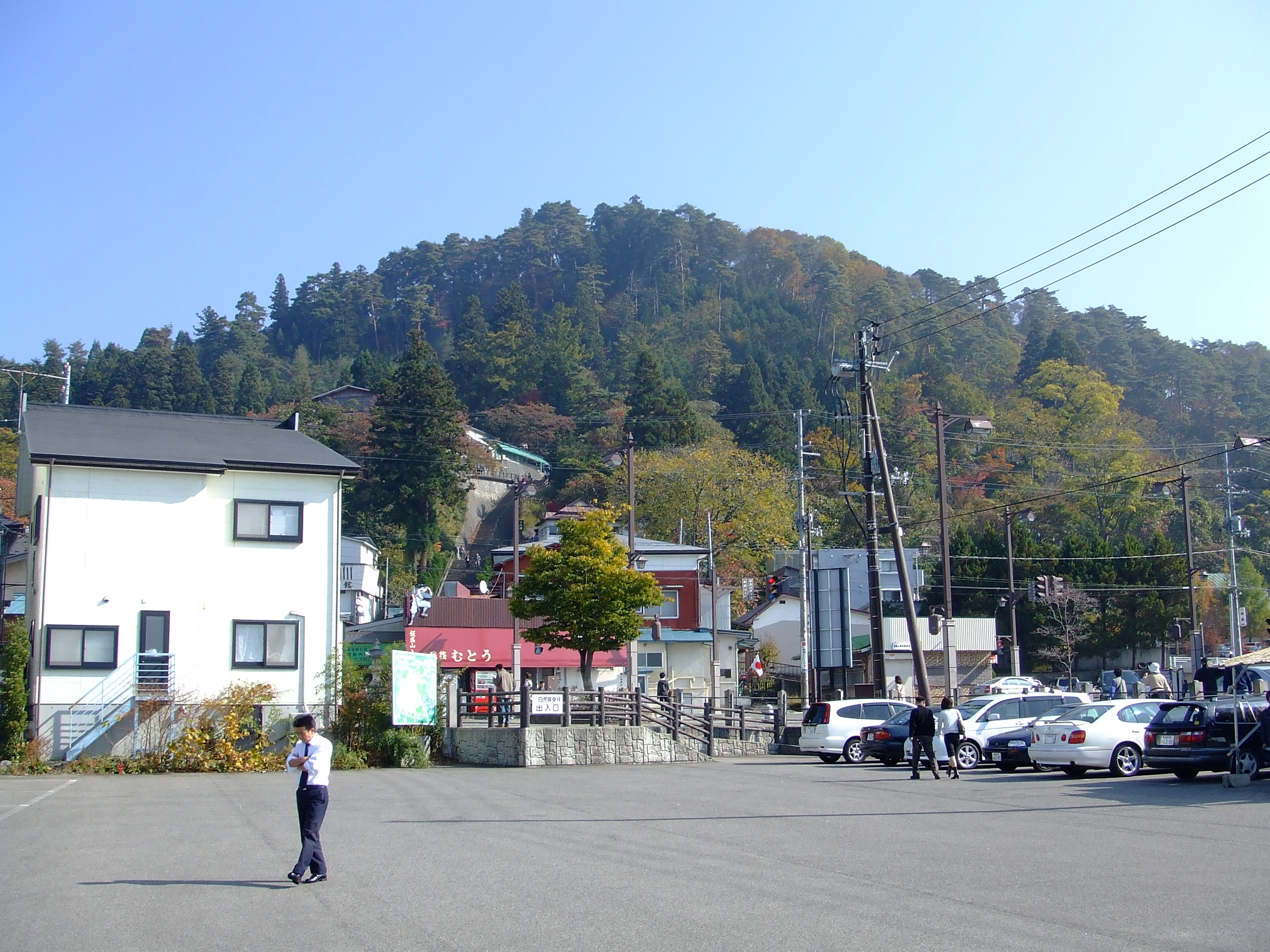
Mount Iimori

Aizuwakamatsu is located in the western part of Fukushima Prefecture, in the southeast part of Aizu basin.

=== Mountains ===
- Mount Iimori
- Mount Oda
- Mount Ōtodake (1416 m)
- Mount Seaburi

=== Rivers ===
- Aga River
- Nippashi River
- Sesenagi River
- Yugawa River

=== Lakes ===
- Lake Higashiyama
- Lake Inawashiro
- Lake Sohara
- Lake Wakasato

=== Hot springs ===
- Ashinomaki Onsen
- Higashiyama Onsen

=== Administrative divisions ===
There are 11 administrative divisions (hamlets or 大字 (ooaza)) in the city.

- Higashiyama
- Ikki
- Kawahigashi
- Kitaaizu
- Kouya
- Kouzashi
- Machikita
- Minato
- Monden
- Ōto
- Wakamatsu

=== Neighboring municipalities ===
Fukushima Prefecture

- North: Kitakata, Aizubange, Yugawa, Bandai
- East: Kōriyama, Inawashiro
- West: Aizumisato
- South: Shimogo, Tenei

The city skyline seen from Aizuwakamatsu Castle, 2017

== Climate ==
Aizuwakamatsu has a hot-summer humid continental climate (Köppen Dfa) closely bordering on a humid subtropical climate (Köppen Cfa) with the January average just below the 0°C isotherm to be classified as the latter, characterized by warm summers and cold winters with heavy snowfall. Although it is located in an inland valley, Aizuwakamatsu's climate resembles that of the Hokuriku region on the Sea of Japan coast. Snowfall is very heavy during the winter at 4.78 metres (190 in), and snow cover reaches an average maximum of 0.39 metres (15.35 in) and has reached as much as 1.15 metres (45.3 in) for short periods, a figure one would usually associate with much colder regions like the Labrador Peninsula. The average annual temperature in Aizuwakamatsu is 11.2 °C. The average annual rainfall is 1270 mm with September as the wettest month. The temperatures are highest on average in August, at around 25.2 °C, and lowest in January, at around −0.3 °C.

Climate data for Wakamatsu, Aizuwakamatsu (1991–2020 normals, extremes 1953–present)
Month	Jan	Feb	Mar	Apr	May	Jun	Jul	Aug	Sep	Oct	Nov	Dec	Year
Record high °C (°F)	13.1 (55.6)	20.2 (68.4)	23.5 (74.3)	30.5 (86.9)	35.6 (96.1)	36.4 (97.5)	38.8 (101.8)	38.7 (101.7)	37.1 (98.8)	31.3 (88.3)	25.7 (78.3)	20.9 (69.6)	38.8 (101.8)
Mean maximum °C (°F)	7.6 (45.7)	10.3 (50.5)	18.3 (64.9)	26.1 (79.0)	30.3 (86.5)	32.1 (89.8)	34.5 (94.1)	35.6 (96.1)	32.8 (91.0)	26.3 (79.3)	19.0 (66.2)	12.8 (55.0)	35.9 (96.6)
Mean daily maximum °C (°F)	2.9 (37.2)	4.0 (39.2)	8.9 (48.0)	16.6 (61.9)	22.7 (72.9)	26.0 (78.8)	29.2 (84.6)	30.8 (87.4)	26.1 (79.0)	19.5 (67.1)	12.2 (54.0)	5.7 (42.3)	17.1 (62.8)
Daily mean °C (°F)	−0.3 (31.5)	0.1 (32.2)	3.7 (38.7)	10.1 (50.2)	16.2 (61.2)	20.5 (68.9)	24.0 (75.2)	25.2 (77.4)	20.8 (69.4)	14.1 (57.4)	7.4 (45.3)	2.2 (36.0)	12.0 (53.6)
Mean daily minimum °C (°F)	−3.4 (25.9)	−3.5 (25.7)	−0.7 (30.7)	4.3 (39.7)	10.3 (50.5)	15.9 (60.6)	20.1 (68.2)	20.8 (69.4)	16.6 (61.9)	9.8 (49.6)	3.3 (37.9)	−0.9 (30.4)	7.7 (45.9)
Mean minimum °C (°F)	−8.7 (16.3)	−8.9 (16.0)	−5.6 (21.9)	−1.5 (29.3)	3.4 (38.1)	10.3 (50.5)	15.7 (60.3)	16.2 (61.2)	9.6 (49.3)	3.0 (37.4)	−2.0 (28.4)	−5.9 (21.4)	−10.0 (14.0)
Record low °C (°F)	−14.4 (6.1)	−15.2 (4.6)	−11.9 (10.6)	−4.6 (23.7)	−1.2 (29.8)	6.9 (44.4)	9.1 (48.4)	10.3 (50.5)	4.8 (40.6)	−1.5 (29.3)	−5.9 (21.4)	−14.4 (6.1)	−15.2 (4.6)
Average precipitation mm (inches)	102.4 (4.03)	69.2 (2.72)	77.5 (3.05)	63.1 (2.48)	75.8 (2.98)	108.6 (4.28)	196.4 (7.73)	139.1 (5.48)	124.0 (4.88)	112.6 (4.43)	75.5 (2.97)	108.7 (4.28)	1,253 (49.33)
Average snowfall cm (inches)	121 (48)	90 (35)	41 (16)	3 (1.2)	0 (0)	0 (0)	0 (0)	0 (0)	0 (0)	0 (0)	1 (0.4)	72 (28)	328 (129)
Average precipitation days (≥ 0.5 mm)	19.0	16.1	16.6	12.0	11.4	12.2	15.2	12.6	12.4	12.4	15.1	18.3	173.2
Average snowy days (≥ 1 cm)	19.1	16.3	7.7	0.6	0.0	0.0	0.0	0.0	0.0	0.0	0.3	10.1	54.2
Average relative humidity (%)	82	79	74	67	67	73	79	77	79	80	83	84	77
Mean monthly sunshine hours	78.0	99.0	144.0	172.0	201.2	165.3	156.9	195.1	141.8	122.1	89.1	67.1	1,631.6
Source: Japan Meteorological Agency (1991–2020 normals, extremes 1953–present)

== Demographics ==
Per Japanese census data, the population of Aizuwakamatsu peaked around the year 1990, and it has since declined to pre-1960 levels.

Historical population
Year	Pop.	±%
1950	115,578	—
1960	119,402	+3.3%
1970	120,839	+1.2%
1980	130,883	+8.3%
1990	136,336	+4.2%
2000	135,415	−0.7%
2010	126,125	−6.9%
2020	117,376	−6.9%

== Government ==
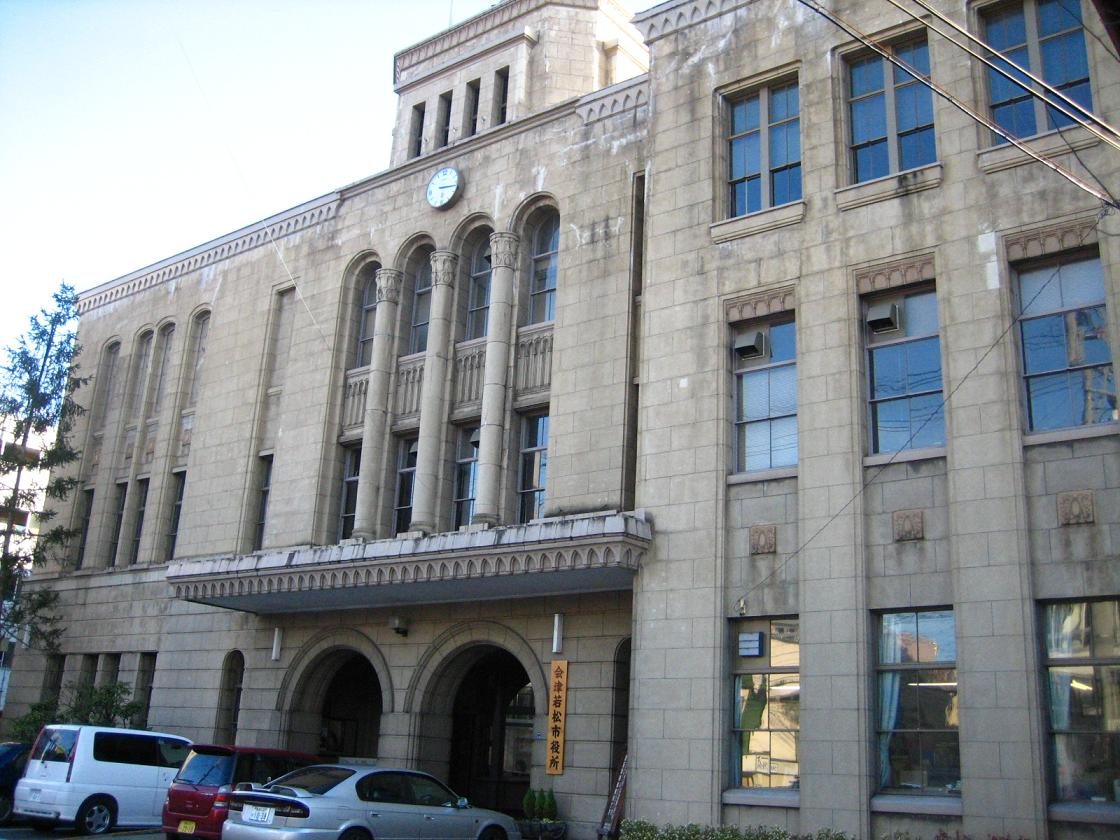
Aizuwakamatsu City Hall

Aizuwakamatsu has a mayor-council form of government with a directly elected mayor and a unicameral city legislature of 29 members The city contributes four members to the Fukushima Prefectural Assembly. In terms of national politics, the city is part of Fukushima Electoral District 4 for the lower house of the Diet of Japan.

== Economy ==
Aizuwakamatsu is a local commercial center. The area is traditionally noted for sake brewing and lacquerware. Modern industries include textiles, wood processing and electronics.

== Education ==
Aizuwakamatsu has one prefectural university and a private junior college. The city has 19 public elementary school and 11 public junior high schools operated by the city government. In addition, there is one private elementary school and one private junior high school. The Fukushima Prefectural Board of Education operates five public high schools and one combined junior/senior high school. The prefecture also operates two special education schools.

=== Universities and colleges ===
- Junior College of Aizu
- University of Aizu

=== Senior high schools ===
==== Public (prefectural) ====
- Aizu High School (会津高等学校)
- Aoi High School (葵高等学校)
- Aizu Gakuhō High School (会津学鳳高等学校)
- Wakamatsu Shōgyō High School (若松商業高等学校)
- Aizu Kōgyō High School (若松工業高等学校)
- Aizu Second High School (会津第二高等学校)

==== Private ====
- Aizuwakamatsu Xaverio Gakuen High School (会津若松ザベリオ学園高等学校)
- Jinai High School (仁愛高等学校)
- Wakamatsu 1st High School (若松第一高等学校)

=== Junior high schools ===
==== Public (municipal) ====
- Aizuwakamatsu First Junior High School (会津若松市立第一中学校)
- Aizuwakamatsu Second Junior High School (会津若松市立第二中学校)
- Aizuwakamatsu Third Junior High School (会津若松市立第三中学校)
- Aizuwakamatsu Fourth Junior High School (会津若松市立第四中学校)
- Aizuwakamatsu Fifth Junior High School (会津若松市立第五中学校)
- Aizuwakamatsu Sixth Junior High School (会津若松市立第六中学校)
- Ikki Junior High School (一箕中学校)
- Ōto Junior High School (大戸中学校)
- Minato Junior High School (湊中学校)
- Kitaaizu Junior High School (北会津中学校)
- Kawahigashi Junior High School (河東中学校)
- Aizu Gakuhō Junior High School (会津学鳳中学校, prefectural)
  - Note: All junior high schools are municipal except for Aizu Gakuhō Junior High School.

==== Private ====
- Aizuwakamatsu Xaverio Gakuen Junior High School (会津若松ザベリオ学園中学校)

== Transportation ==
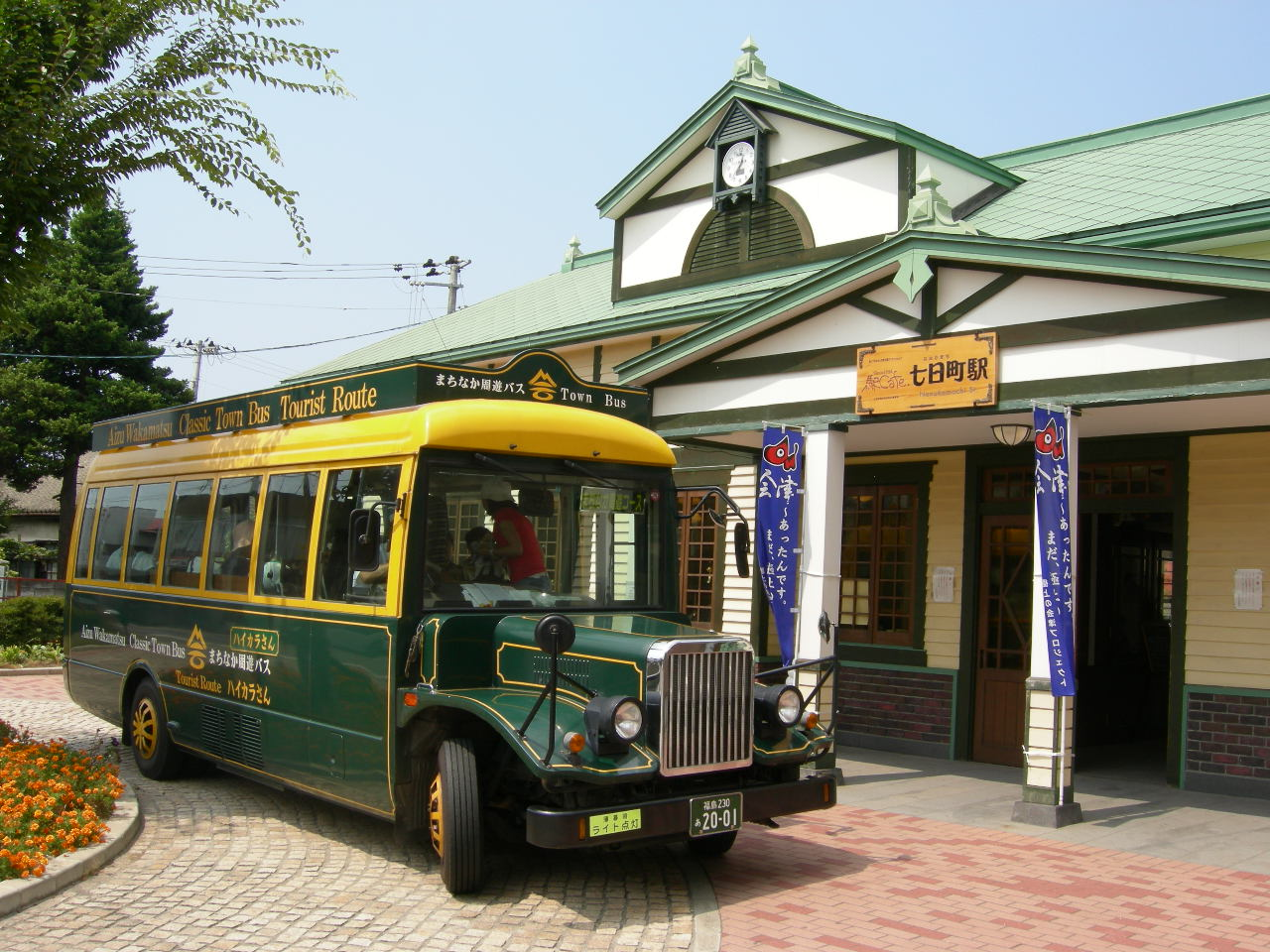
Classic Town Bus "Haikara-san"

=== Railway ===
JR East – Banetsu West Line

- Higashi-Nagahara – Hirota – Aizu-Wakamatsu – Dōjima

JR East – Tadami Line

- Aizu-Wakamatsu – Nanukamachi – Nishi-Wakamatsu – Aizu-Hongō

Aizu Railway – Aizu Line

- Nishi-Wakamatsu – Minami-Wakamatsu – Monden – Amaya – Ashinomaki-Onsen – Ōkawa-Dam-Kōen – Ashinomaki-Onsen-Minami

=== Highway ===
- Ban-etsu Expressway – Bandai-Kawahigashi IC – Aizu-Wakamatsu IC
- National Route 49
- National Route 118
- National Route 121
- National Route 252
- National Route 294
- National Route 401

=== Bus ===
- Aizu Bus

== Media ==
=== Television ===
- Fukushima Broadcasting
- Fukushima Central Television
- Fukushima Television Broadcasting
- NHK Fukushima
- TV-U Fukushima

=== Newspapers ===
- Fukushima Mimpō
- Fukushima Min-Yū

=== Radio ===
- FM Aizu

== Sister cities ==
=== Japanese sister cities ===
- (Aomori Prefecture) Mutsu, Aomori, since September 23, 1984
- (Tokushima Prefecture) Naruto, Tokushima, since October 30, 1999
- (Nagano Prefecture) Ina, Nagano, since September 24, 2000
- (Kanagawa Prefecture) Yokosuka, Kanagawa, since April 17, 2005

=== International sister cities ===
- Jingzhou, China since June 15, 1991
- (United States) Saipan, since September 22, 2006
- (United States) Lee's Summit, Missouri, United states, Since November 21, 2002

== Local attractions ==
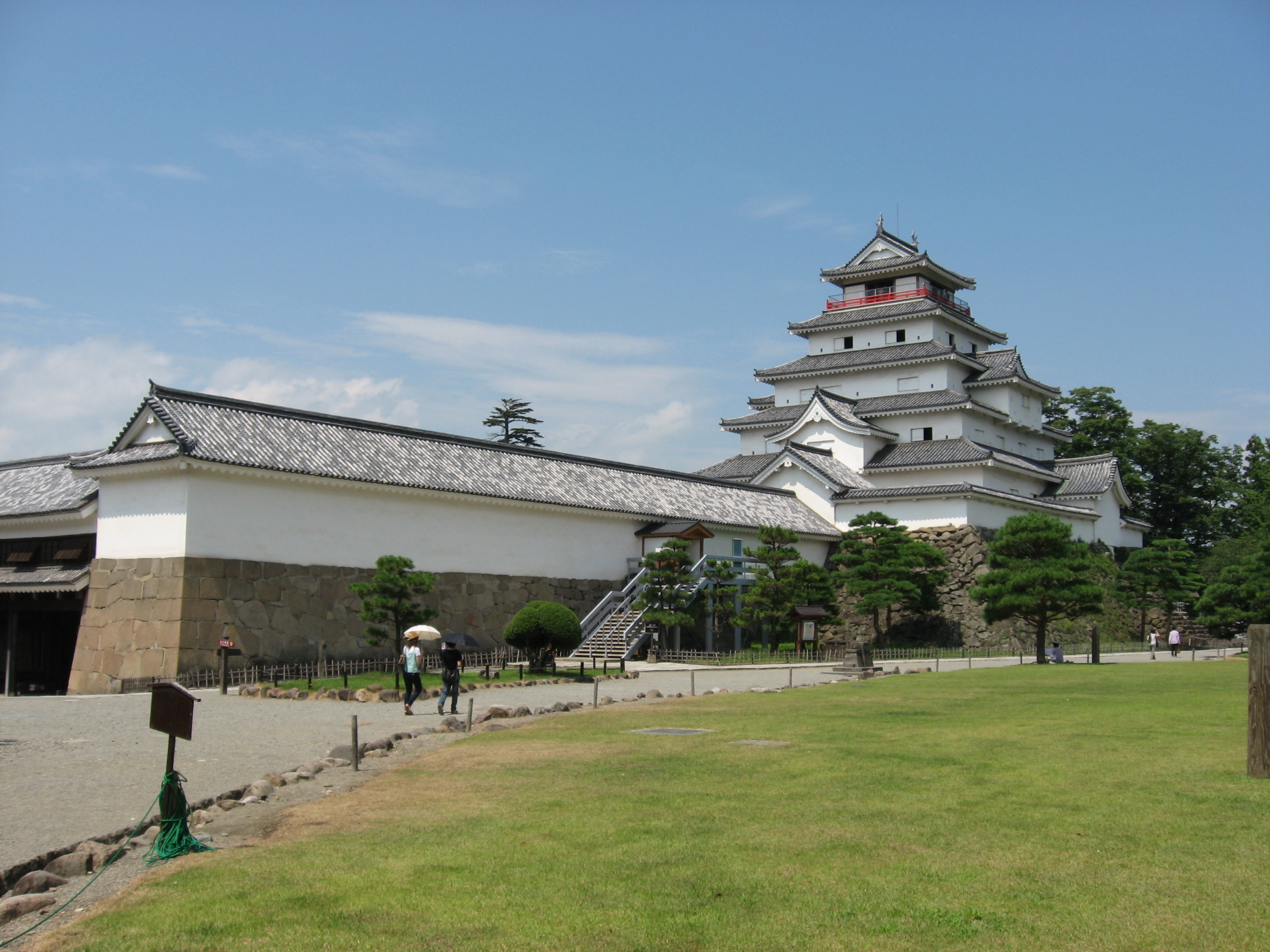
Aizuwakamatsu Castle (Tsuruga-jo)

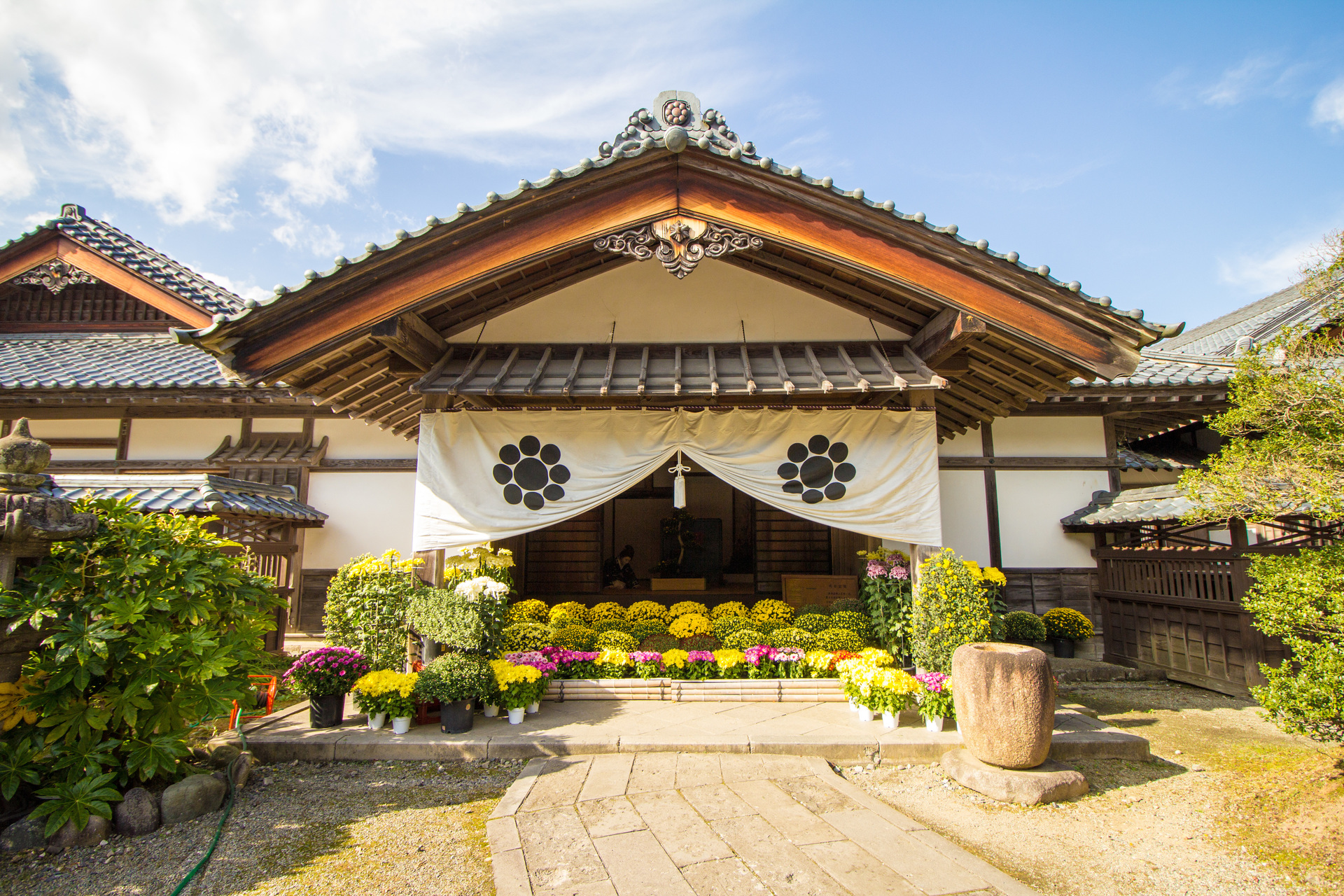
Aizu Samurai Residences

- Aizuwakamatsu Castle (Tsuruga-jo)
- Aizu Matsudaira's Royal Garden (Oyakuen)
- Mount Iimori
  - Byakkotai graves
  - Aidzu Sazaedou
- former Takizawa Honjin
- Aizu Matsudaira clan grave
- Nisshinkan
- Aizu Samurai Residences
- Nanokamachi-dori Street

== Culture ==
=== Festivals ===
- Aizu Festival

=== Foods ===
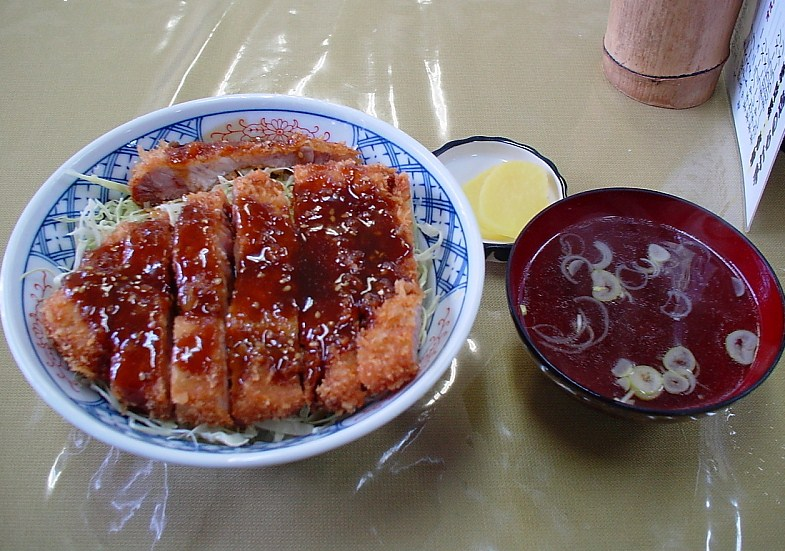
Sauce Katsu-don

- Basashi (horse sashimi)
- Boutara
- Kozuyu
- Sake
- Sauce Katsu-don
- Soba

=== Others ===
- Akabeko
- Okiagari-koboshi

== Notable people from Aizuwakamatsu ==
- Arisu Endo (1997-), pro wrestler
- Sōichirō Hoshi (1972–), voice actor
- Wakashima Kyūzaburō (1842–1891), sumo wrestler
- Aya Ohori (1996–), Japanese badminton player
- Hiroshi Sasagawa (1936–), anime creator
- Kei Satō (1928–2010), actor, narrator
