= Michael Tsetlin =

Soviet mathematician, physicist, and engineer

- Михаил Львович Цетлин
- Born: September 22, 1924; Moscow, Moscow Oblast, USSR
- Died: May 30, 1966 (aged 41)
- Citizenship: Soviet Union
- Education: Moscow State University
- Known for: Artificial Intelligence; Automata theory Cybernetics; Gelfand–Tsetlin basis
- Scientific career
- Fields: Mathematician
- Workplaces: Moscow State University
- Doctoral students: Victor Varshavsky

Michael Lvovitch Tsetlin (also transliterated as Cetlin, Tzetlin, Zeitlin, or Zetlin; Cyrillic: Михаил Львович Цетлин) (22 September 1924 – 30 May 1966) was a Soviet mathematician, physicist, engineer, and inventor, noted for his pioneering contributions to cybernetics, automata theory, and artificial intelligence.

== Early life and academic career ==
Tsetlin was born in Moscow on 22 September 1924. His mother, Elizaveta Moiseevna Hamburg-Tsetlin, was a physician who devoted over four decades to medicine, and his father, Lev Solomonovich Tsetlin, was active in publishing and the history of science. He was a winner of the Moscow school mathematical olympiad and constructed complex electronic devices while still at school, including a vacuum tube radio receiver.

His studies were interrupted by the Second World War. Drafted into the Soviet Army in 1942, Tsetlin served as a reconnaissance scout, radio operator, and psychological warfare specialist at the front. For his wartime service, he was awarded the Medal "For Courage" and the Order of the Red Star. During this period, he became fluent in German and Polish, engaged in translating poetry, and developed close friendships with anti-fascist prisoners of war, experiences which shaped his later interest in communication, social systems, and human behaviour. Following demobilisation, he briefly worked as a teacher of German in Poland before returning to Moscow.

Tsetlin resumed his academic career at Moscow State University, enrolling in the Physics Department in 1947. He studied under Israel Moiseevich Gelfand, who recognised Tsetlin's mathematical talent and became his long-term collaborator. In 1958, Tsetlin obtained his Ph.D. with a thesis entitled "Matrix Method of Scheme Synthesis and Some of Its Applications," a work that formed the foundation for much of his subsequent research.

== Scientific contributions ==
Tsetlin's research spanned a wide range of disciplines, including mathematics, physics, biology, and medicine. He was instrumental in the development of automata theory, where he introduced the concept of expedient behaviour in automata and established hierarchical principles involving collectives of automata. His collaboration with Gelfand produced the Gelfand–Tsetlin basis for finite-dimensional representations of classical groups.

Beyond theoretical research, Tsetlin was a significant inventor and engineer, specialising in electronics and medical instrumentation. His applied work included the development of a prosthetic hand controlled by bioelectrical signals and a diagnostic device for cardiac arrhythmias. These innovations reflected his enduring interest in the practical applications of scientific knowledge for human benefit, shaped in part by his wartime experiences.

Tsetlin's research on automata extended to models of learning and behaviour, leading to fundamental insights into adaptive systems. His exploration of collectives of automata—systems composed of numerous interacting automata, each solving simpler individual tasks—anticipated concepts later influential in both biological modelling and distributed artificial intelligence.

== Editorial and professional roles ==
Tsetlin served as a member of the editorial board of the journal *Problems of Information Transmission* («Проблемы передачи информации»), reflecting his respected position within the Soviet scientific community. He was also active within the Scientific Council on Cybernetics of the Academy of Sciences of the USSR, where he played a key role in supporting emerging research areas, including structural linguistics and systems theory.

== Character and legacy ==
Colleagues remembered Tsetlin for his combination of imaginative creativity and intellectual clarity. His formative wartime experiences contributed to a lifelong ethical commitment to addressing real-world problems through science. Notably, Tsetlin resisted the lure of abstract mathematical formalism divorced from practical application, advocating instead for science that remained engaged with societal needs.

Although he died prematurely at the age of 41, Tsetlin's ideas continued to exert influence on subsequent developments in artificial intelligence. His research on automata contributed to the posthumous development of the Tsetlin machine, a logical learning framework that integrates automata with propositional logic.

== See also ==
- Gelfand–Tsetlin integrable system
- Boolean differential calculus
- Learning automaton
- Tsetlin machine
- Victor Varshavsky

== Collection of publications ==
- Tsetlin, M. L. *Automation theory and modelling of biological systems.* Academic Press; 1973.
