= University of Aizu =

Higher education institution in Fukushima Prefecture, Japan

Coordinates: 37°31′25.2″N 139°56′19.5″E

The University of Aizu
- 会津大学
- Motto: "to advance knowledge for humanity"
- Type: Prefectural
- Established: 1993
- President: Toshiaki Miyazaki
- Administrative staff: 150
- Location: Aizuwakamatsu, Fukushima, Japan
- Campus: Urban, 20 hectares
- Website: www.u-aizu.ac.jp

The University of Aizu (Japanese: 会津大学, romanized: Aizu Daigaku) is a public university in Aizuwakamatsu, Fukushima Prefecture, Japan. The university is dedicated to computer science and engineering and English language education.

== Description ==
The university specializes in computer science and engineering education, both hardware and software, at the undergraduate and postgraduate levels. It is known for its open access to computers; there is a 1:1 ratio of computers to students, and students have access to a computer 24 hours a day. Additionally, the computers are replaced every three years, so the available computer equipment is always recent technology.

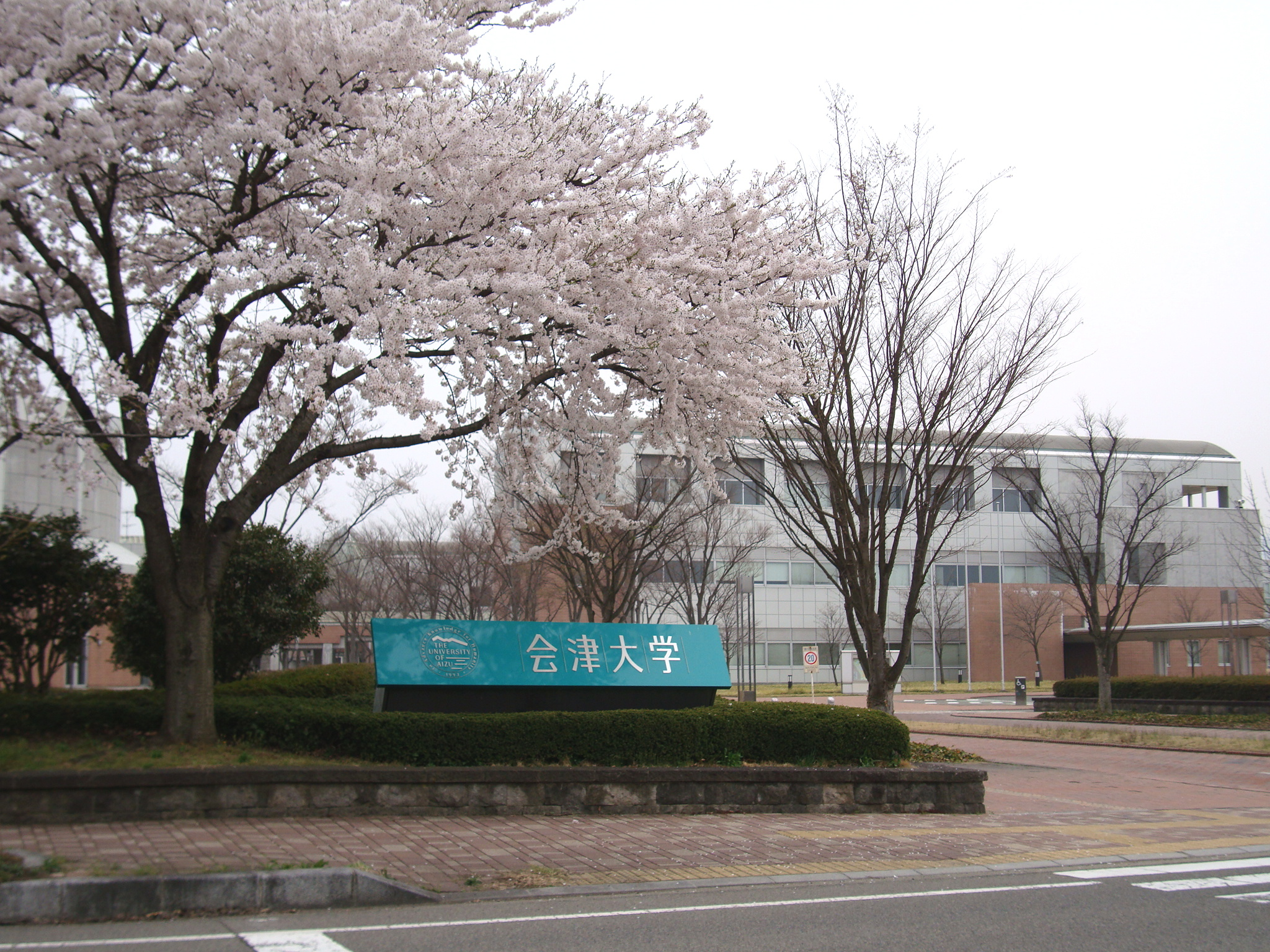
University of Aizu main gate

In addition to computer science and engineering, English language education is an important aspect of the University of Aizu. The university is officially bilingual and all official meetings and correspondence are interpreted and translated. Approximately 40% of professors come from overseas, including countries such as Vietnam, India, South Korea, Canada, United States, Russia and China. Not only do students enroll in English courses throughout their undergraduate programs, many of their computer science courses are taught in English. Students are required to write a graduation thesis in English. The university has international students at the masters and doctoral levels.

== Rankings ==
UoA was ranked 18th (2nd among public universities) and was ranked 7th in the field of computer science in "THE World University Rankings Japan 2022" by Times Higher Education (THE), a British education magazine, released on March 25, 2021. This ranking evaluates universities based on 16 indicators in four areas: educational resources, educational enrichment, educational outcomes, and internationalization, and the University of Aizu was ranked second among public universities.

It was ranked 1st in Fostering Entrepreneurship Number of university-launched ventures(Public universities in Japan). The UoA is recognized by many companies and has maintained nearly a 100% of employment rate since its foundation.

== Top Global University ==
In September 2014, the Ministry of Education, Culture, Sports, Science and Technology (MEXT) selected the University of Aizu as one among 37 universities for the Top Global University Project.

== Campus ==
The university is located on a 20 hectare campus in Aizu-Wakamatsu, Fukushima. The university has a student dormitory, sports and swimming facilities, and numerous playing fields.

== Faculties and graduate schools ==
- Computer Science and Engineering
- Information Technology and Project Management

== Graduate fields of study ==
- Computer Devices
- Information Systems
- Computer Network Systems
- Recognition and the Human Interface
- Algorithms and Theoretical Computer Science
- Computer Organization and Parallel Processing
- Synthetic Worlds, Virtual Reality and Multimedia
- Knowledge Engineering, Cybernetics and Software Systems
- Software Engineering and Information Technology

== Research institutes, centers, and facilities ==
- University Business Innovation Center
- Center for Language Research
