= Aizu-Arakai Station =

Railway station in Minamiaizu, Fukushima Prefecture, Japan

Aizu-Arakai Station 会津荒海駅
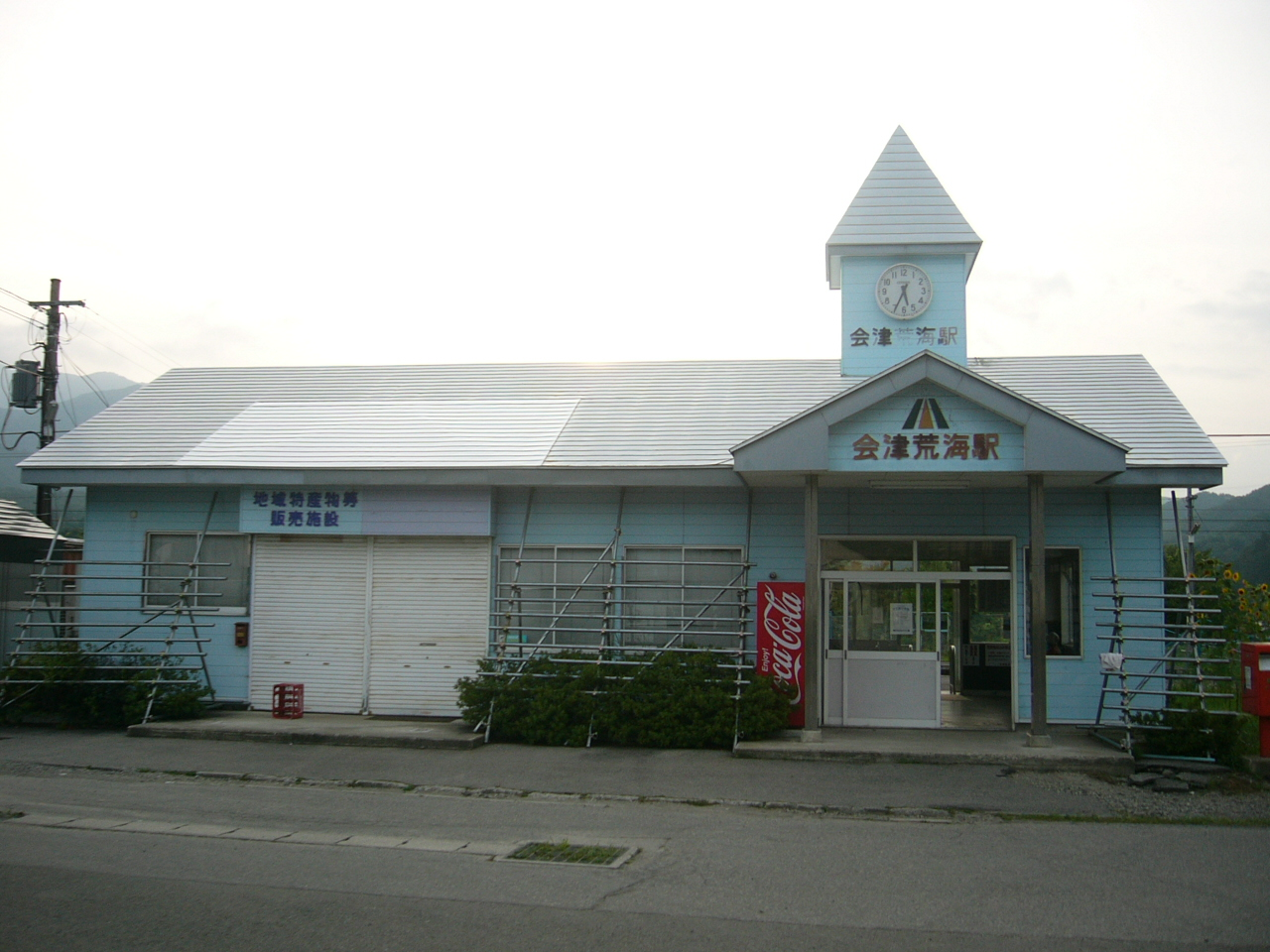
- Aizu-Arakai Station in August 2006

General information
- Location: 527 Sekimoto Momoichi, Minamiaizu-machi, Minamiaizu-gun, Fukushima-ken 967-0013; Japan
- Coordinates: 37.1532°N 139.7336°E
- Operator: Aizu Railway
- Line: ■Aizu Line
- Distance: 49.2 km from Nishi-Wakamatsu
- Platforms: 2 side platforms
- Tracks: 2

Other information
- Status: Unstaffed
- Website: Official website

History
- Opened: 12 December 1947
- Former names: Arakai (until 1987)

Services
Preceding station	Aizu Railway	Following station
Aizu-Sanson-Dōjō towards Aizukōgen-Ozeguchi	Aizu Line Local	Nakaarai towards Aizu-Wakamatsu
Location
- Location within Fukushima Prefecture Location within Japan

Aizu-Arakai Station (会津荒海駅, Aizu-Arakai-eki) is a railway station on the Aizu Railway Aizu Line in the town of Minamiaizu, Minamiaizu District, Fukushima Prefecture, Japan, operated by the Aizu Railway.

== Lines ==
Aizu-Arakai Station is served by the Aizu Railway Aizu Line, and is located 49.2 kilometers from the official starting point of the line at Nishi-Wakamatsu.

== Station layout ==
Aizu-Arakai Station has two opposed side platforms connected to the station building by a level crossing. The station is unattended.

=== Platforms ===
1	■ Aizu Railway Aizu Line	for Aizukōgen-Ozeguchi
2	■ Aizu Railway Aizu Line	for Aizu-Tajima, Nishi-Wakamatsu

== History ==
The station opened on December 12, 1947, as Arakai Station (荒海駅). It was the terminus of the line from its opening until the opening of Aizu-Takinohara Station in 1953, at which time the locomotive turntable located here was removed. JNR discontinued freight service at this station on November 1, 1972. The station was transferred to the Aizu Railway on 16 July 1987 along of the rest of the line between Nishi-Wakamatsu and Aizukogen-Ozeguchi.

== Surrounding area ==
- National Route 121
- Arakai Post Office
- Minamiaizu Arakai Junior High School
- Minamiaizu Arakai Elementary School

== See also ==
- List of railway stations in Japan
