= Nanukamachi Station =

Railway station in Aizuwakamatsu, Fukushima Prefecture, Japan

Nanukamachi Station 七日町駅
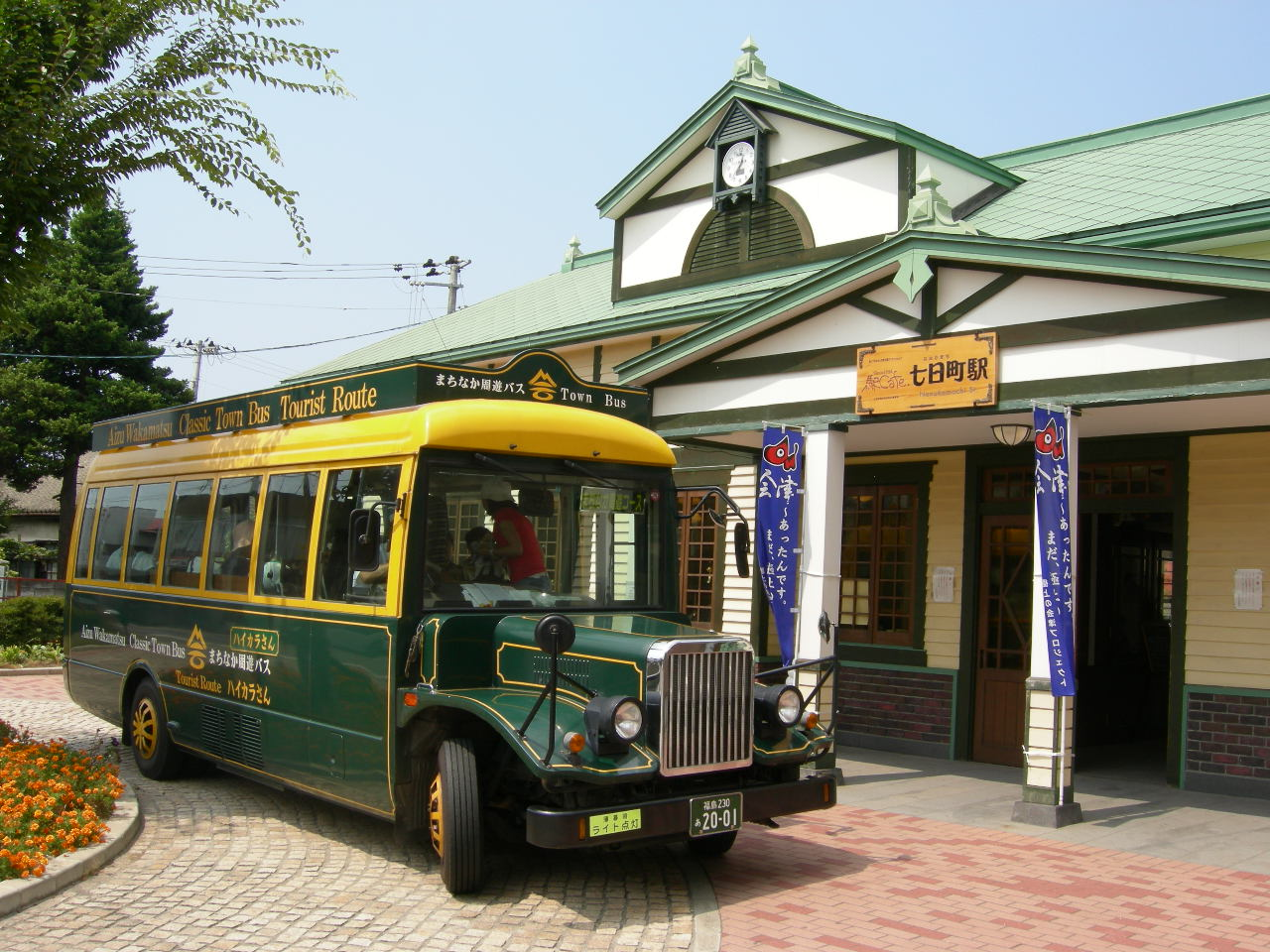
- Nanukamachi station and "Haikara-san"

General information
- Location: 5-1 Nanukamachi, Aizuwakamatsu-shi, Fukushima-ken 965-0044; Japan
- Coordinates: 37°30′4.2″N 139°55′8.4″E
- Operator: JR East; Aizu Railway
- Lines: ■ Tadami Line; ■ Aizu Line
- Platforms: 1 side platform

Other information
- Status: Unstaffed
- Website: Official website

History
- Opened: November 1, 1934

Services
Preceding station	JR East	Following station
Nishi-Wakamatsu towards Koide	Tadami Line	Aizu-Wakamatsu Terminus
Preceding station	Aizu Railway	Following station
Nishi-Wakamatsu towards Aizu-Tajima	Aizu Line Rapid Relay	Aizu-Wakamatsu Terminus
Nishi-Wakamatsu towards Aizukōgen-Ozeguchi	Aizu Line Local	Aizu-Wakamatsu Terminus
Location
- Location within JR Tadami Line Location within Fukushima Prefecture Location within Japan

Nanukamachi Station (七日町駅, Nanukamachi-eki) is a railway station on the Tadami Line in the city of Aizuwakamatsu, Fukushima Prefecture, Japan, operated by East Japan Railway Company (JR East). Nanukamachi is "七日町" in Japanese. It means that bazaar was held on the seventh day in Edo era. "七日町" is also called "Nanokamachi".

== Lines ==
Nanukamachi Station is served by the Tadami Line and is located 1.3 rail kilometres from the official starting point of the line at Aizu-Wakamatsu Station. It is also served by trains of the Aizu Railway Aizu Line to continue past the nominal terminus of the line at Nishi-Wakamatsu and travel on the Aizu-Wakamatsu.

== Station layout ==
Nanukamachi Station has one side platform serving a single bi-directional track. The station is unattended; however, within the station building is the "EkiCafe", a shop that sells many things of Aizu region, such as traditional sweets. And it also has an information corner about sightseeing in Aizu. The bus for sightseeing of Aizuwakamatsu stops at Nanukamachi station, It's called "Haikara-san".

== History ==
Nanukamachi Station opened on November 1, 1934, as an intermediate station on the initial eastern section of the Japanese National Railways (JNR) Tadami Line between Aizu-Wakamatsu and Aizu-Yanaizu. Operations were suspended from June 20, 1945, to June 20, 1946. The station was absorbed into the JR East network upon the privatization of the JNR on April 1, 1987. A new station building was completed July 28, 2002.

== Surrounding area ==
- Amida Temple
- Aizuwakamatsu city hall
- Aizuwakamatsu post office
- Wakamatsu-Nanukamachi post office
- Nisshin Elementary School
- Aoi Senior High School
- Aizuwakamatsu Xaverio Gakuen
  - Elementary School
  - Junior High School
  - Senior High School
- National Route 118
- National Route 252
- Fukushima Prefectural Route 59
- Fukushima Prefectural Route 325
- Fukushima Prefectural Route 326

== See also ==
- List of railway stations in Japan
