= Nanatsugatake-Tozanguchi Station =

Railway station in Minamiaizu, Fukushima Prefecture, Japan

Nanatsugatake-Tozanguchi Station 七ヶ岳登山口駅
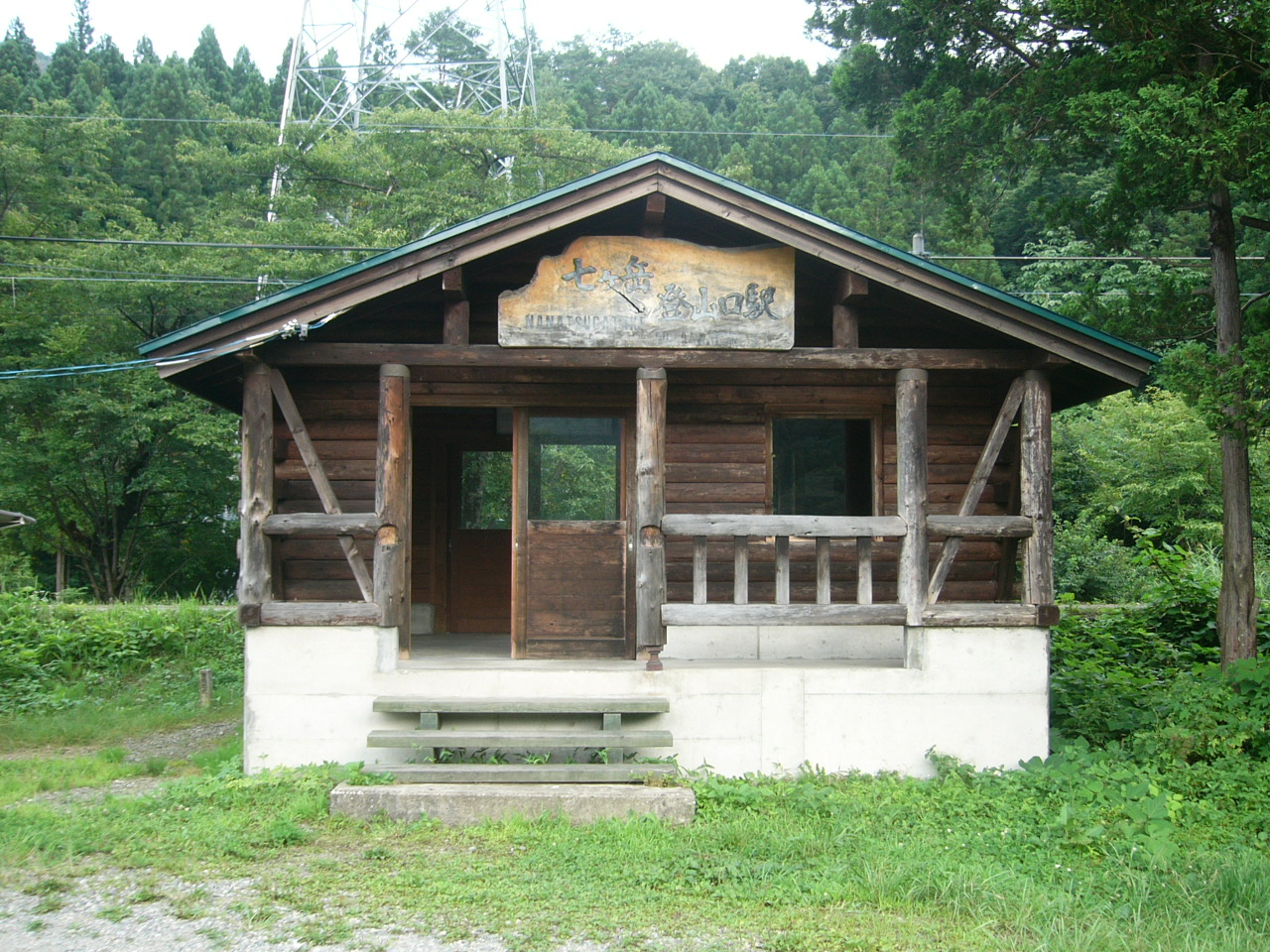
- Nanatsugatake-Tozanguchi Station in August 2006

General information
- Location: Itosawa Shimomiaya-no-hara 2449-2, Minamiaizu-machi, Minamiaizu-gun, Fukushima-ken 967-0014; Japan
- Coordinates: 37°07′27″N 139°43′03″E
- Operator: Aizu Railway
- Line: ■Aizu Line
- Distance: 53.1 km from Nishi-Wakamatsu
- Platforms: 1
- Tracks: 1

Other information
- Status: Unstaffed
- Website: Official website

History
- Opened: November 8, 1953
- Former names: Itosawa (until 1987)

Services
Preceding station	Aizu Railway	Following station
Aizukōgen-Ozeguchi Terminus	Aizu Line Local	Aizu-Sanson-Dōjō towards Aizu-Wakamatsu
Location
- Location within Fukushima Prefecture Location within Japan

Nanatsugatake-Tozanguchi Station (七ヶ岳登山口駅, Nanatsugatake-Tozanguchi-eki) is a railway station on the Aizu Railway Aizu Line in the town of Minamiaizu, Minamiaizu District, Fukushima Prefecture, Japan, operated by the Aizu Railway.

== Lines ==
Nanatsugatake-Tozanguchi Station is served by the Aizu Line, and is located 53.1 rail kilometers from the official starting point of the line at Nishi-Wakamatsu.

== Station layout ==
Nanatsugatake-Tozanguchi Station has a single side platform serving a single bi-directional track. The station is unattended.

== History ==
Nanatsugatake-Tozanguchi Station opened on 8 November 1953 as Itozawa Station (糸沢駅, Itozawa-eki). The station was transferred to the Aizu Railway on 16 July 1987 along of the rest of the line between Nishi-Wakamatsu and Aizukogen-Ozeguchi.

== Surrounding area ==
- National Route 121
- Nanatsugatake

== See also ==
- List of railway stations in Japan
