= Tō-no-Hetsuri Station =

Railway station in Shimogō, Fukushima Prefecture, Japan

Tō-no-Hetsuri Station 塔のへつり駅
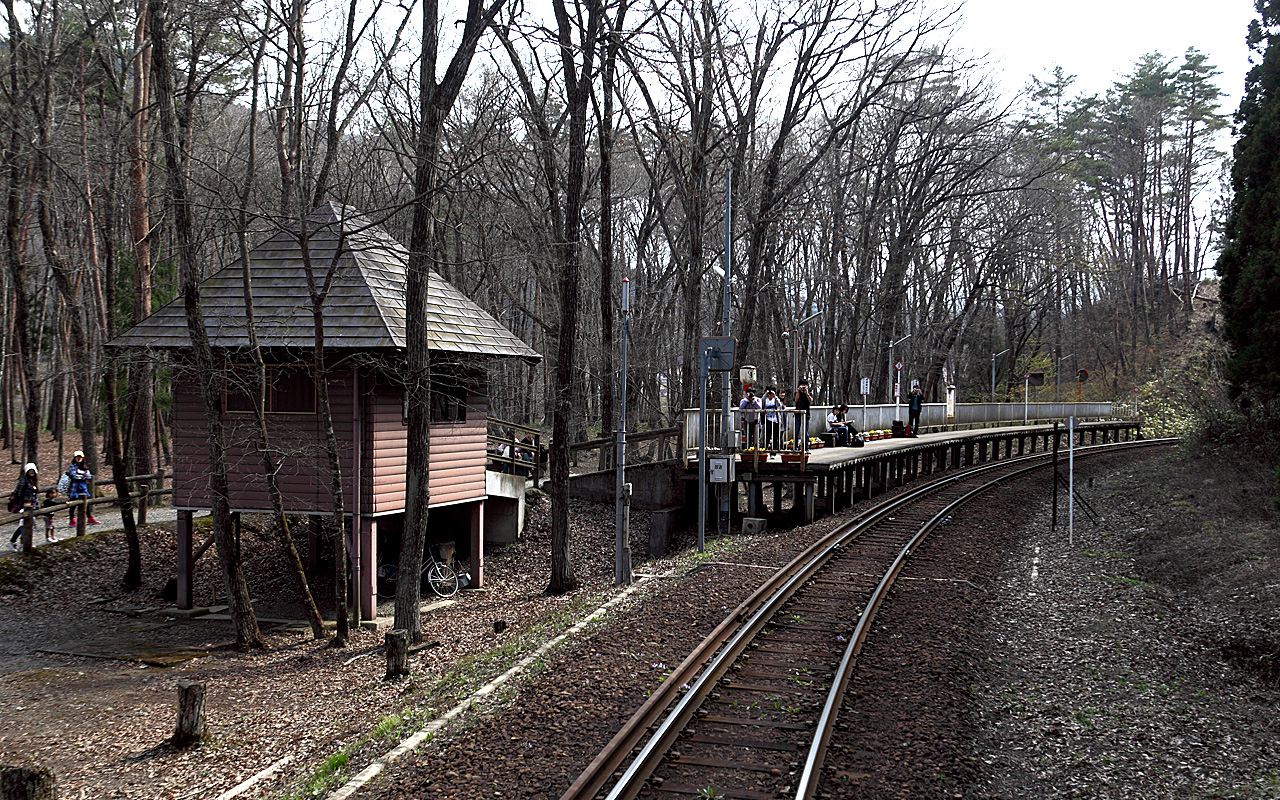
- Tō-no-Hetsuri Station in May 2010

General information
- Location: Yagshima yurin 5331-3, Shimogō-machi, Minamiaizu-gun, Fukushima-ken 969-5204; Japan
- Coordinates: 37°16′28″N 139°54′06″E
- Operator: Aizu Railway
- Line: ■Aizu Line
- Distance: 26.5 km from Nishi-Wakamatsu
- Platforms: 1 side platform
- Tracks: 1

Other information
- Status: Unstaffed
- Website: Official website

History
- Opened: April 27, 1988

Services
Preceding station	Aizu Railway	Following station
Aizu-Shimogō towards Aizu-Tajima	Aizu Line Rapid Relay	Yunokami-Onsen towards Aizu-Wakamatsu
Yagoshima towards Aizukōgen-Ozeguchi	Aizu Line Local	Yunokami-Onsen towards Aizu-Wakamatsu
Location
- Location within Fukushima Prefecture Location within Japan

Tō-no-Hetsuri Station (塔のへつり駅, Tō-no-Hetsuri-eki) is a railway station on the Aizu Railway Aizu Line in the town of Shimogō, Minamiaizu District, Fukushima Prefecture, Japan, operated by the Aizu Railway.

== Lines ==
Tō-no-Hetsuri Station is served by the Aizu Line, and is located 26.5 rail kilometers from the official starting point of the line at Nishi-Wakamatsu.

== Station layout ==
Tō-no-Hetsuri Station has one side platform serving a single bi-directional track. The station is unattended.

== History ==
Tō-no-Hetsuri Station opened on April 27, 1988.

== Surrounding area ==
- National Route 121
- Tō-no-Hetsuri rock formations

== See also ==
- List of railway stations in Japan
