= Yagoshima Station =

Railway station in Shimogō, Fukushima Prefecture, Japan

Yagoshima Station 弥五島駅
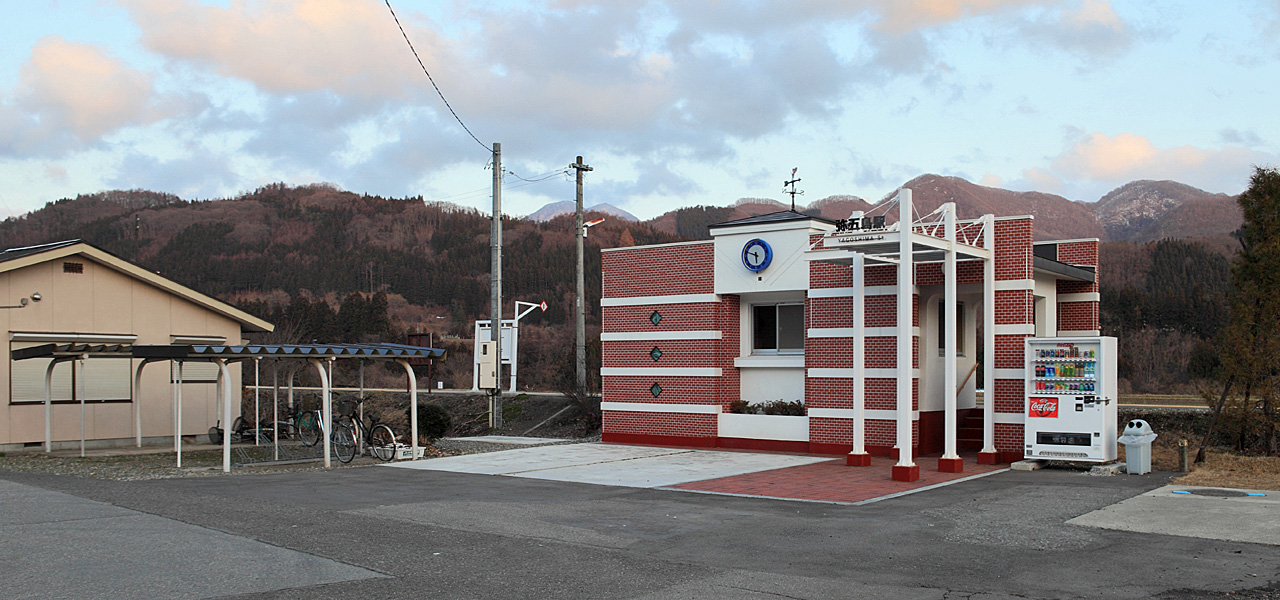
- Yagoshima Station in April 2010

General information
- Location: Yagoshima Terashita, Shimogō-machi, Minamiaizu-gun, Fukushima-ken 969-5204; Japan
- Coordinates: 37.2665°N 139.8900°E
- Operator: Aizu Railway
- Line: ■Aizu Line
- Distance: 28.0 km from Nishi-Wakamatsu
- Platforms: 1 side platform
- Tracks: 1

Other information
- Status: Unstaffed
- Website: Official website

History
- Opened: December 27, 1934

Services
Preceding station	Aizu Railway	Following station
Aizu-Shimogō towards Aizukōgen-Ozeguchi	Aizu Line Local	Tō-no-Hetsuri towards Aizu-Wakamatsu
Location
- Location within Fukushima Prefecture Location within Japan

Yagoshima Station (弥五島駅, Yagoshima-eki) is a railway station on the Aizu Railway Aizu Line in the town of Shimogō, Minamiaizu District, Fukushima Prefecture, Japan, operated by the Aizu Railway. Yagoshima Station opened on December 27, 1934

== Lines ==
Yagoshima Station is served by the Aizu Line, and is located 28.0 rail kilometers from the official starting point of the line at Nishi-Wakamatsu.

== Station layout ==
Yagoshima Station has one side platform serving a single bi-directional track. The station is unattended.

== History ==
The station was transferred to the Aizu Railway on 16 July 1987.
