= Aizu-Shimogō Station =

Railway station in Shimogō, Fukushima Prefecture, Japan

Aizu-Shimogō Station 会津下郷駅
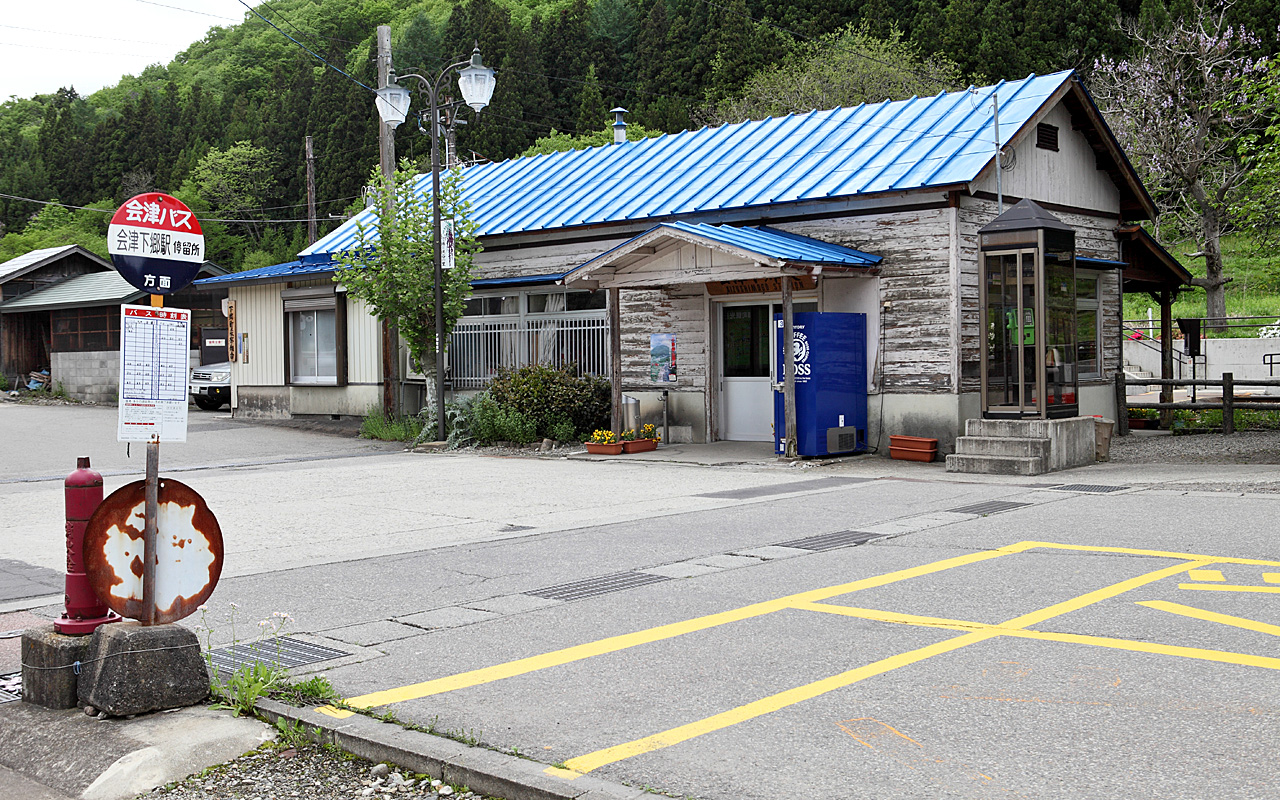
- Aizu-Shimogō Station in May 2010

General information
- Location: Toyonari Shimo 6276, Shimogō-machi, Minamiaizu-gun, Fukushima-ken 969-5311; Japan
- Coordinates: 37.2551°N 139.8651°E
- Operator: Aizu Railway
- Line: ■Aizu Line
- Distance: 31.1 km from Nishi-Wakamatsu
- Platforms: 1
- Tracks: 1

Other information
- Status: Staffed
- Website: Official website

History
- Opened: December 27, 1934
- Former names: Narahara (until 1984)

Services
Preceding station	Aizu Railway	Following station
Aizu-Tajima Terminus	Aizu Line Rapid Relay	Tō-no-Hetsuri towards Aizu-Wakamatsu
Furusato-Kōen towards Aizukōgen-Ozeguchi	Aizu Line Local	Yagoshima towards Aizu-Wakamatsu
Location
- Location within Fukushima Prefecture Location within Japan

Aizu-Shimogō Station (会津下郷駅, Aizu-Shimogō-eki) is a railway station on the Aizu Railway Aizu Line in the town of Shimogō, Minamiaizu District, Fukushima Prefecture, Japan, operated by the Aizu Railway.

== Lines ==
Aizu-Shimogō Station is served by the Aizu Line, and is located 31.1 rail kilometers from the official starting point of the line at Nishi-Wakamatsu.

== Station layout ==
Aizu-Shimogō Station has a single island platform connected to the station building by a level crossing. The station is staffed.

=== Platforms ===
station side	■ Aizu Railway Aizu Line	for Aizukōgen-Ozeguchi
opposite side	■ Aizu Railway Aizu Line	for Aizu-Tajima, Nishi-Wakamatsu

== History ==
Aizu-Shimogō Station opened on December 27, 1934, as Narahara Station (楢原駅, Narahara eki). The station was transferred to the Aizu Railway on 16 July 1987.

== Surrounding area ==
- Narahara Post Office
- Shimogō Town Hall
- National Route 121

== See also ==
- List of railway stations in Japan
