= Ōkawadamukōen Station =

Railway station in Aizuwakamatsu, Fukushima Prefecture, Japan

Coordinates: 37°20′49″N 139°55′15″E

Ōkawadamukōen Station 大川ダム公園駅
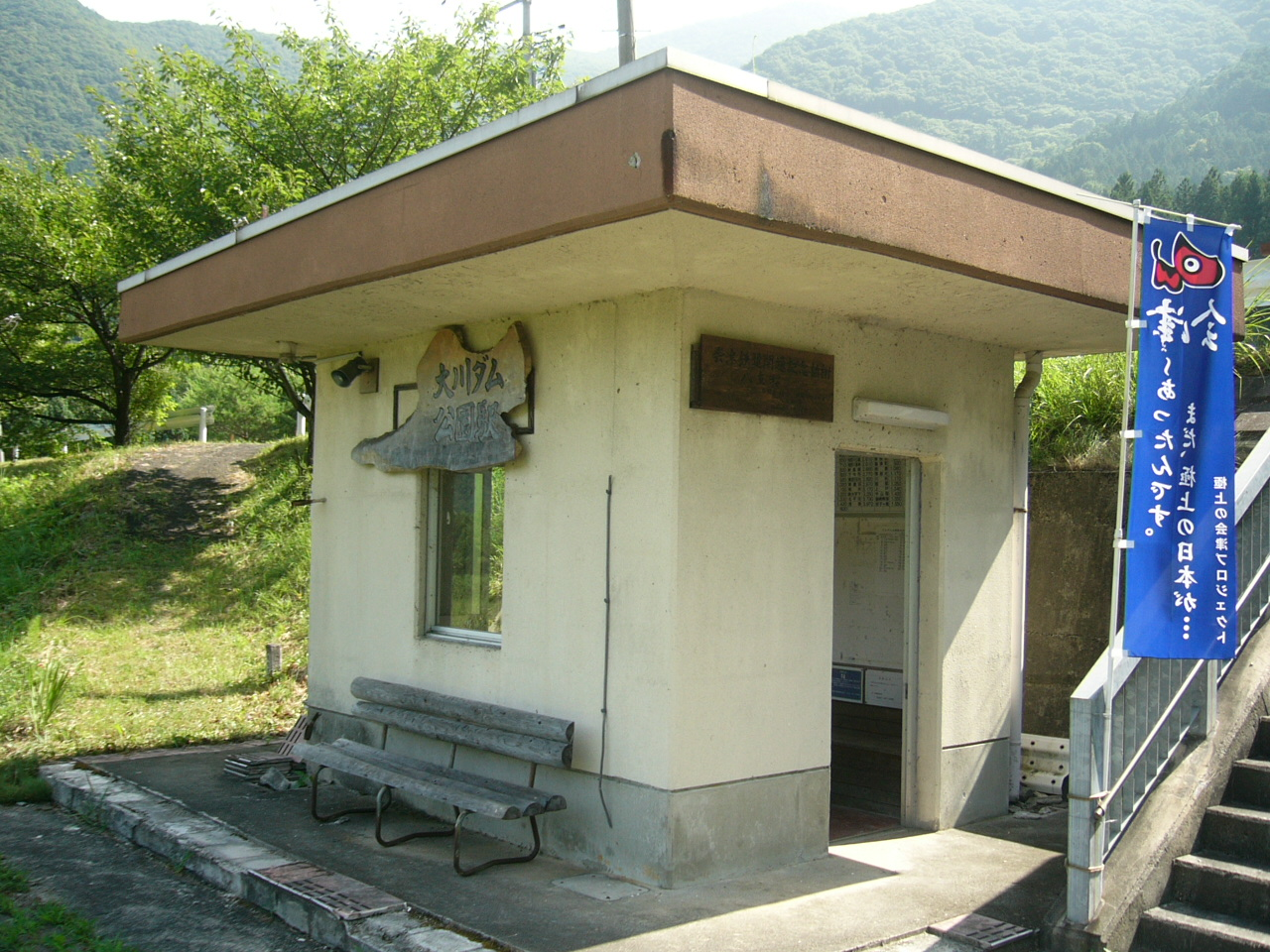
- Ōkawa-Dam-Kōen Station in August 206

General information
- Location: Oto-cho, Ōkawa otsu roku-roku ishi 2974-3, Aizuwakamatsu, Fukushima （福島県会津若松市大戸町大字大川ロクロク石乙2974-3） Japan
- Operator: Aizu Railway
- Line: Aizu Line

History
- Opened: 1987
- Former names: Funako (until 1987)

Services
Preceding station	Aizu Railway	Following station
Ashinomaki-Onsen-Minami towards Aizukōgen-Ozeguchi	Aizu Line Local	Ashinomaki-Onsen towards Aizu-Wakamatsu
Location

Ōkawadamukōen Station (大川ダム公園駅, Ōkawadamukōen-eki) is a railway station on the Aizu Railway Aizu Line in Aizuwakamatsu, Fukushima Prefecture, Japan, operated by the Aizu Railway.

== Lines ==
Ōkawadamukōen Station is served by the Aizu Line, and is located 16.2 rail kilometers from the official starting point of the line at Nishi-Wakamatsu Station.

== Station layout ==
Ōkawadamukōen Station has a single side platform serving traffic in both directions. There is no station building, but only a waiting room. The station is unattended.

== History ==
Ōkawadamukōen Station opened on November 1, 1927 a signal stop, and was upgraded to a Funako Station (舟子駅, Funako-eki) on April 1, 1987. The station was transferred to the Aizu Railway on 16 July 1987.

== Surrounding area ==
- Japan National Route 118
- Ōkawa Dam

== In media ==
The 4th episode of the TV series "Tetsu Ota Michiko, 20,000 km" is dedicated to this station
