= Nakaarai Station =

Railway station in Minamiaizu, Fukushima Prefecture, Japan

Nakaarai Station 中荒井駅
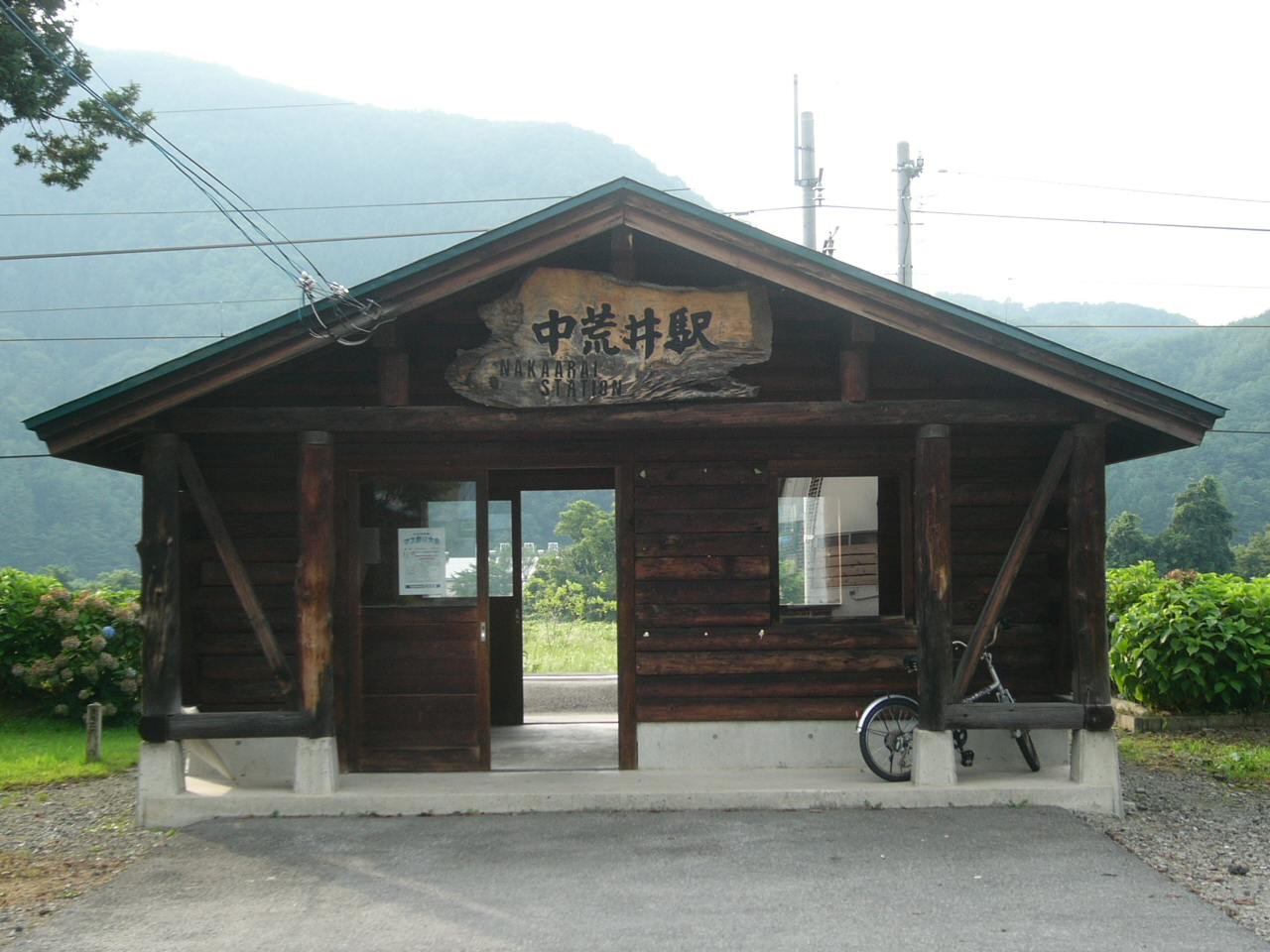
- Nakaarai Station in August 2006

General information
- Location: Nakaarai Nagaaze 534-1, Minamiaizu-machi, Minamiaizu-gun, Fukushima-ken 967-0005; Japan
- Coordinates: 37°10′49″N 139°45′03″E
- Operator: Aizu Railway
- Line: ■Aizu Line
- Distance: 45.8 km from Nishi-Wakamatsu
- Platforms: 1
- Tracks: 1

Other information
- Status: Unstaffed
- Website: Official website

History
- Opened: 12 December 1947

Services
Preceding station	Aizu Railway	Following station
Aizu-Arakai towards Aizukōgen-Ozeguchi	Aizu Line Local	Aizu-Tajima towards Aizu-Wakamatsu
Location
- Location within Fukushima Prefecture Location within Japan

Nakaarai Station (中荒井駅, Nakaarai-eki) is a railway station in the town of Minamiaizu, Fukushima Prefecture, Japan, operated by the Aizu Railway Company.

== Lines ==
Nakaarai Station is served by trains running on the Aizu Line and is located 45.8 rail kilometers from the official starting-point of the line at Nishi-Wakamatsu.

== Station layout ==
Nakaarai Station has a single side platform serving a single bi-directional track. The station building is a log cabin. The station is unattended.

== History ==
Nakaarai Station was opened on 12 December 1947.

The station was transferred to the Aizu Railway on 16 July 1987.

== Surrounding area ==
- National Route 121

== See also ==
- List of railway stations in Japan
