= Tajimakōkōmae Station =

Railway station in Minamiaizu, Fukushima Prefecture, Japan

Tajimakōkōmae Station 田島高校前駅
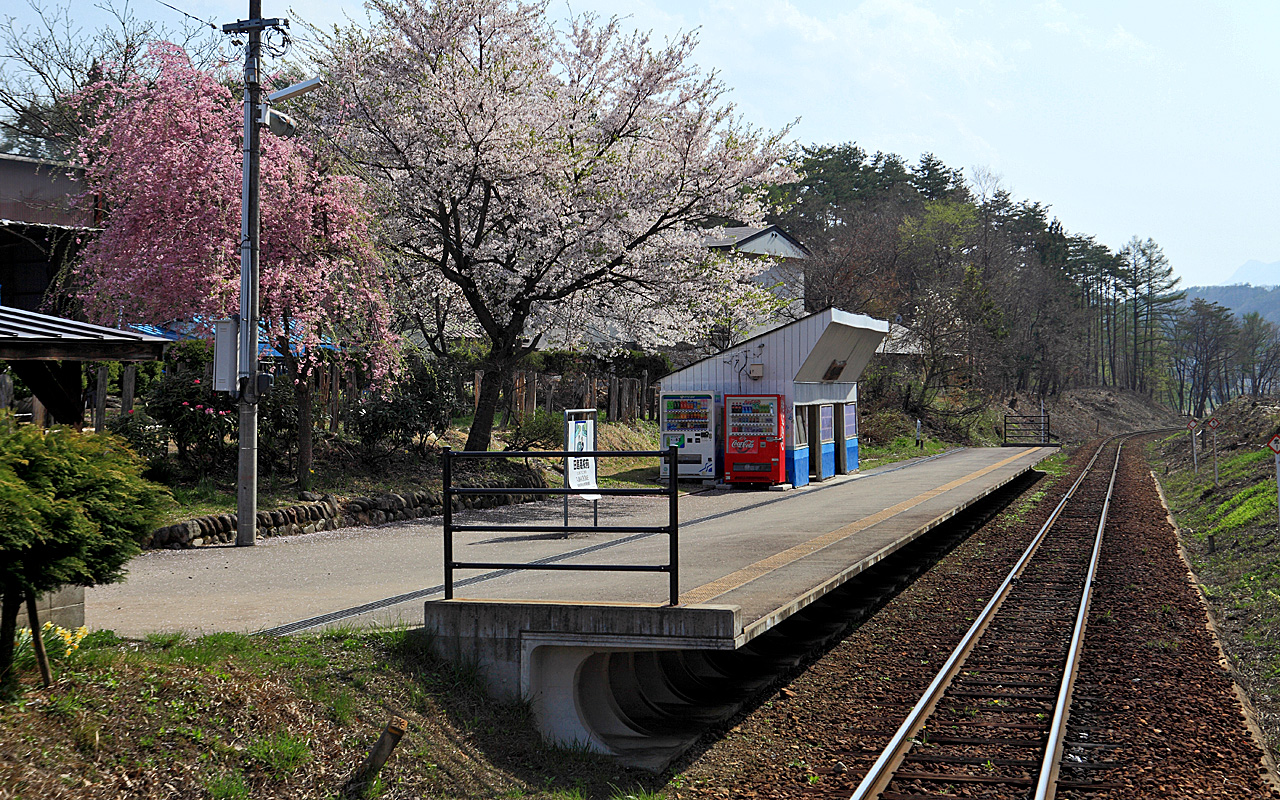
- Tajimakōkōmae Station in May 2010

General information
- Location: Tabehara 1693-173, Minamiaizu-machi, Minamiaizu-gun, Fukushima-ken 967-0004; Japan
- Coordinates: 37°12′34″N 139°48′03″E
- Operator: Aizu Railway
- Line: ■Aizu Line
- Distance: 39.5 km from Nishi-Wakamatsu
- Platforms: 1
- Tracks: 1

Other information
- Status: Unstaffed
- Website: Official website

History
- Opened: December 1, 1951
- Former names: Tabehara (until 1987)

Services
Preceding station	Aizu Railway	Following station
Aizu-Tajima towards Aizukōgen-Ozeguchi	Aizu Line Local	Aizu-Nagano towards Aizu-Wakamatsu
Location

Tajimakōkōmae Station (田島高校前駅, Tajimakōkōmae-eki) is a railway station on the Aizu Railway Aizu Line in the town of Minamiaizu, Minamiaizu District, Fukushima Prefecture, Japan, operated by the Aizu Railway.

== Lines ==
Tajimakōkōmae Station is served by the Aizu Line, and is located 39.5 rail kilometers from the official starting point of the line at Nishi-Wakamatsu.

== Station layout ==
Tajimakōkōmae Station has a single side platform serving a single bi-directional track. There is no station building, but only a waiting room on the platform. The station is unattended.

== History ==
Tajimakōkōmae Station opened on 1 December 1951 as Tabehara Station (田部原駅). The station was transferred to the Aizu Railway on 16 July 1987.

== Surrounding area ==
- Fukushima Prefectural Tajima High School
- National Route 121

== See also ==
- List of railway stations in Japan
