= Monden Station =

Railway station in Aizuwakamatsu, Fukushima Prefecture, Japan

Monden Station 門田駅
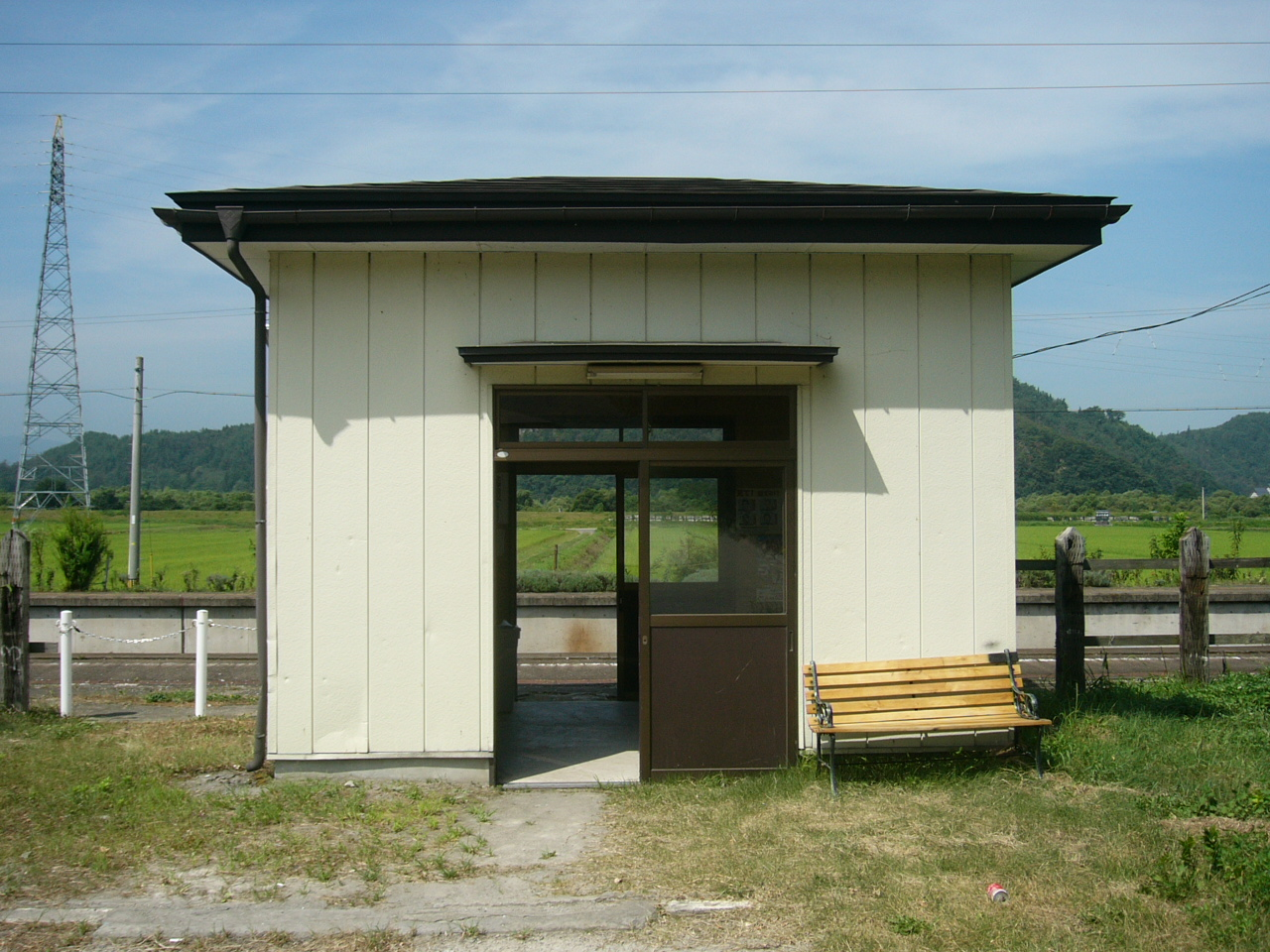
- Monden Station in August 2006

General information
- Location: Monden-cho, Aizuwakamatsu-shi, Fukushima-ken 965-0828; Japan
- Coordinates: 37.4427°N 139.9136°E
- Operator: Aizu Railway
- Line: ■Aizu Line
- Distance: 4.9 km from Nishi-Wakamatsu
- Platforms: 1 side platform
- Tracks: 1

Other information
- Status: Unstaffed
- Website: Official website

History
- Opened: November 1, 1927

Services
Preceding station	Aizu Railway	Following station
Amaya towards Aizukōgen-Ozeguchi	Aizu Line Local	Minami-Wakamatsu towards Aizu-Wakamatsu
Location
- Location within Fukushima Prefecture Location within Japan

Monden Station (門田駅, Monden-eki) is a railway station on the Aizu Railway Aizu Line in the city of Aizuwakamatsu, Fukushima, Japan, operated by the Aizu Railway.

== Lines ==
Monden Station is served by the Aizu Line, and is located 4.9 rail kilometers from the official starting point of the line at Nishi-Wakamatsu Station.

== Station layout ==
Monden Station has two opposed side platforms connected by a level crossing. There is no station building, but only a shelter by the platform. The station is unattended.

== History ==
Monden Station opened on November 1, 1927.

== Surrounding area ==
- National Route 118

== See also ==
- List of railway stations in Japan
