= Yōson-Kōen Station =

Railway station in Shimogō, Fukushima Prefecture, Japan

Yōson-Kōen Station 養鱒公園駅
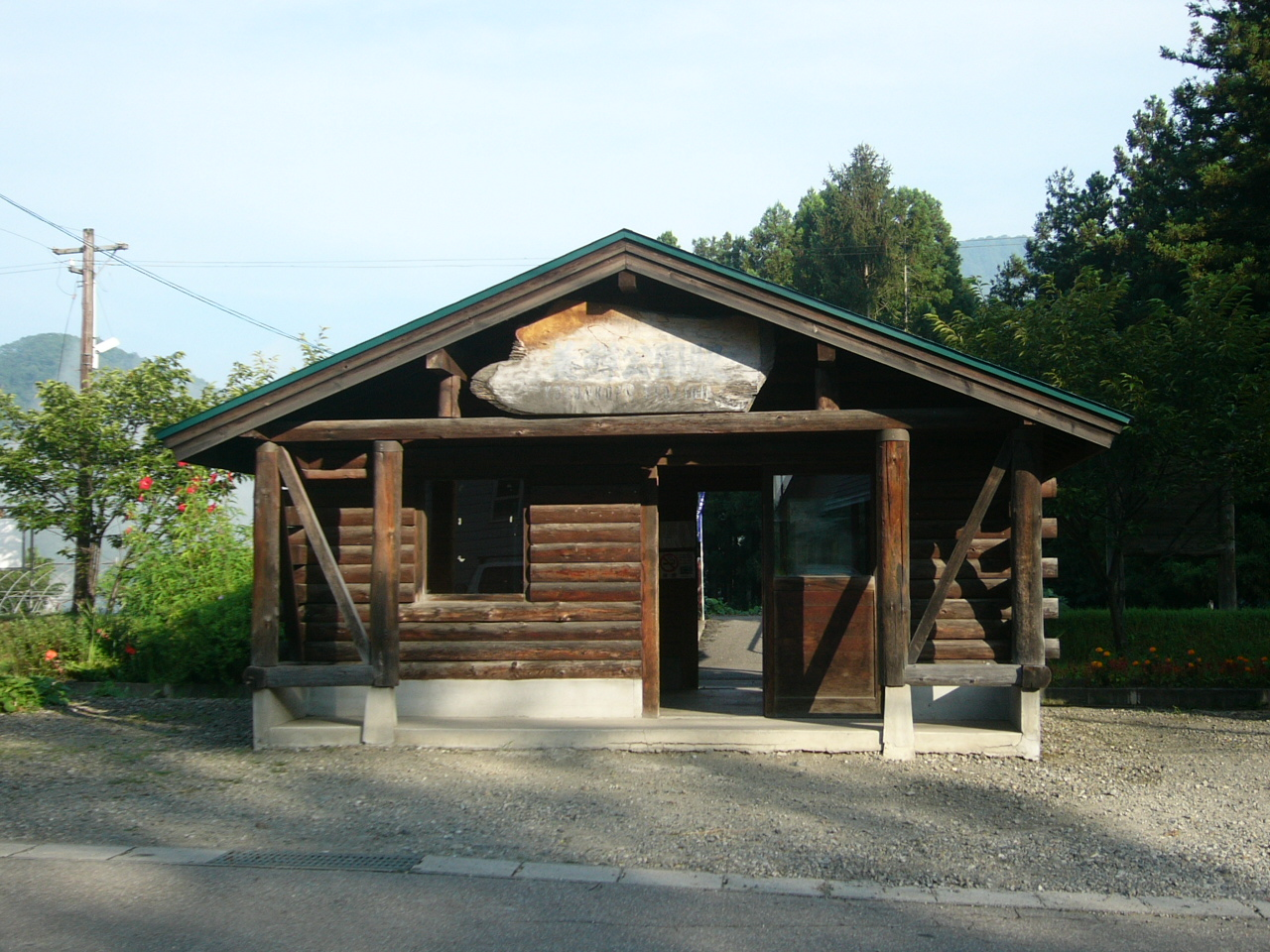
- Yōson-Kōen Station in August 2006

General information
- Location: Ochiai Shimo-no-hara 810-19, Shimogō-machi, Minamiaizu-gun, Fukushima-ken 969-5343; Japan
- Coordinates: 37°13′28″N 139°50′30″E
- Operator: Aizu Railway
- Line: ■Aizu Line
- Distance: 35.1 km from Nishi-Wakamatsu
- Platforms: 1
- Tracks: 1

Other information
- Status: Unstaffed
- Website: Official website

History
- Opened: September 20, 1947
- Former names: Aizu-Ochiai (until 1987)

Services
Preceding station	Aizu Railway	Following station
Aizu-Nagano towards Aizukōgen-Ozeguchi	Aizu Line Local	Furusato-Kōen towards Aizu-Wakamatsu
Location
- Location within Fukushima Prefecture Location within Japan

Yōson-Kōen Station (養鱒公園駅, Yōson-Kōen-eki) is a railway station on the Aizu Railway Aizu Line in the town of Shimogō, Minamiaizu District, Fukushima Prefecture, Japan, operated by the Aizu Railway.

== Lines ==
Yōson-Kōen Station is served by the Aizu Line, and is located 35.1 rail kilometers from the official starting point of the line at Nishi-Wakamatsu.

== Station layout ==
Yōson-Kōen Station has one side platform serving a single bi-directional track. The station is unattended.

== History ==
Yōson-Kōen Station opened on September 20, 1947 as Aizu-Ochiai Station (会津落合駅, Aizu-Ochiai eki). The station was transferred to the Aizu Railway on 16 July 1987.

== Surrounding area ==
- Yōson-Kōen
- National Route 121

== See also ==
- List of railway stations in Japan
