= Tō-no-Hetsuri =

Coordinates: 37°16′25.3″N 139°54′21.2″E

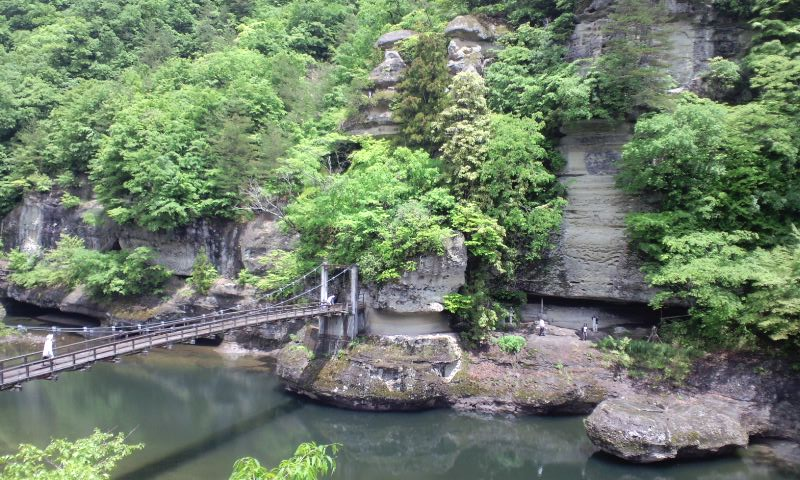
Bridge of Tō-no-Hetsuri

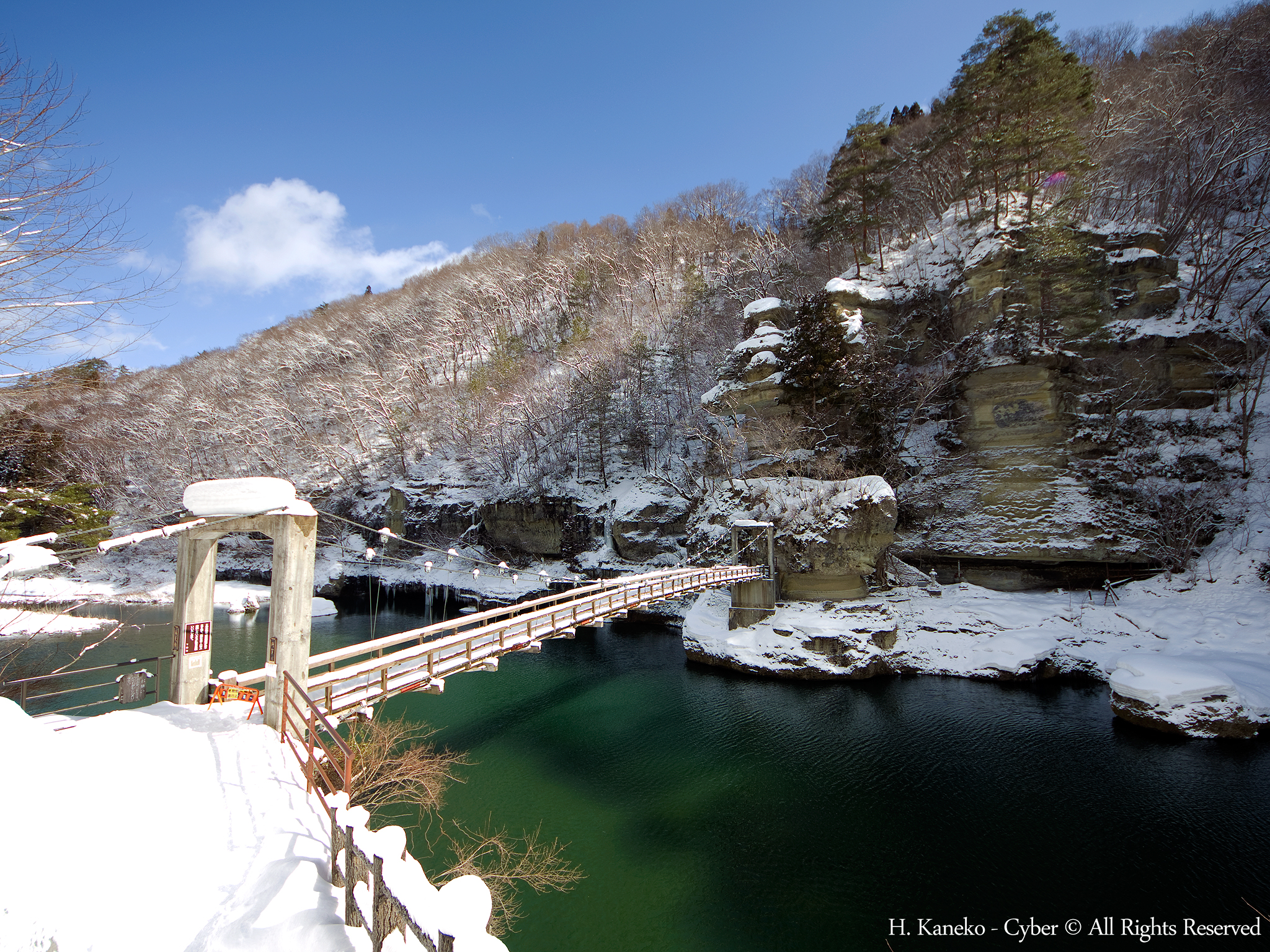
Bridge of Tō-no-Hetsuri in snow

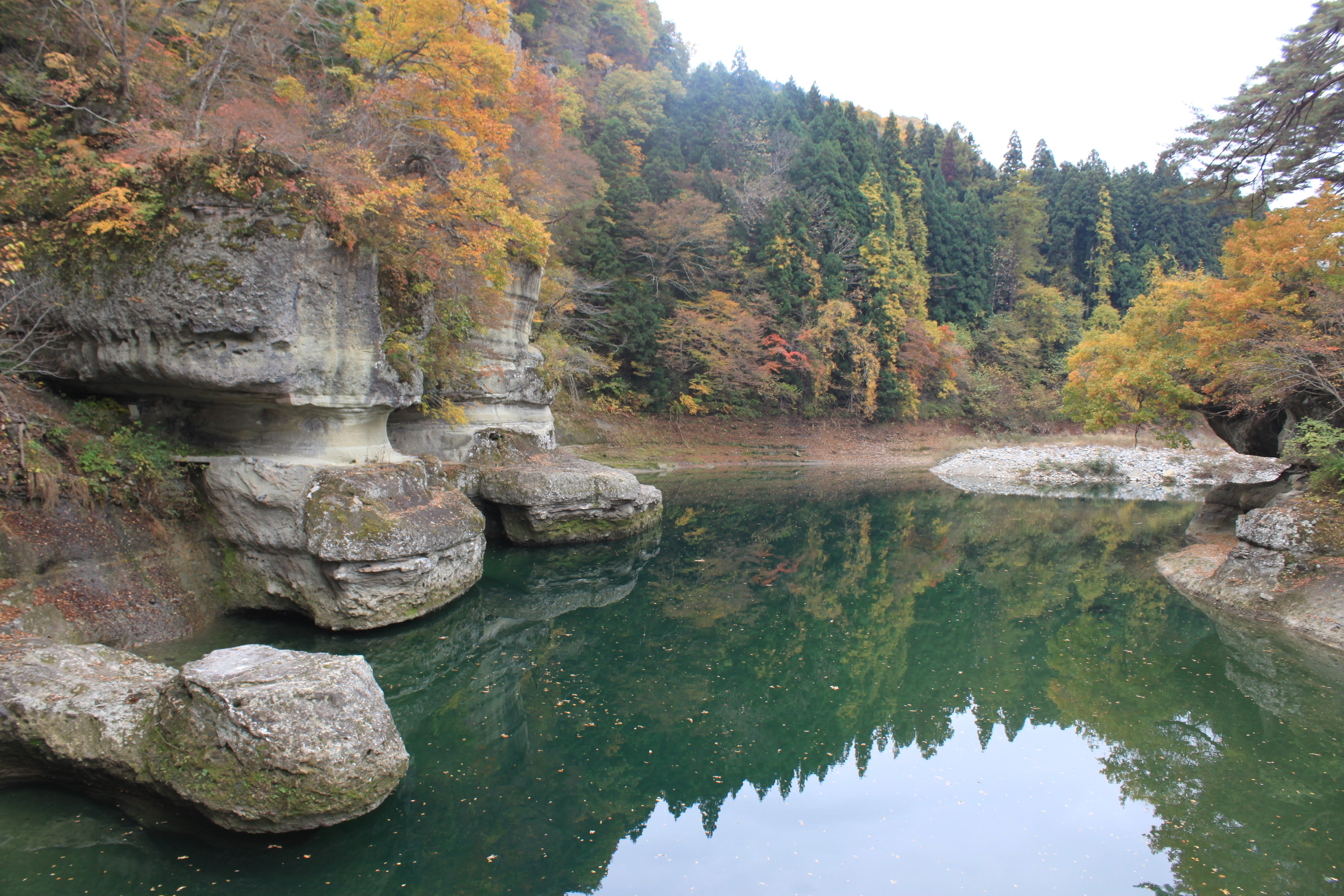
Cliff face of Tō-no-Hetsuri

Tō-no-Hetsuri (塔のへつり; lit. "tower cliffs overlooking a river") is a 200 metre long natural cliff formation located in Ōkawa Hatori Prefectural Park in Shimogō in Fukushima, Japan.

== History ==
The name Hetsuri comes from the local Aizu word for "cliff overlooking a river".

The area was designated a natural monument in 1943 as a unique example of terrain formed during the Pleistocene epoch. The cliff sides were carved out by the Agano River (known as the Ōkawa River in Fukushima Prefecture) over hundreds of years.

Today, the area is a popular sightseeing spot in Fukushima Prefecture.

== Transportation ==
- Aizu Railway Aizu Line, Tō-no-Hetsuri Station - a 10 minutes walk from the station.
- Japan National Route 121

== See also ==
- shimogo, Fukushima
- Ouchi-juku
