= Amaya Station =

Railway station in Aizuwakamatsu, Fukushima Prefecture, Japan

Amaya Station あまや駅
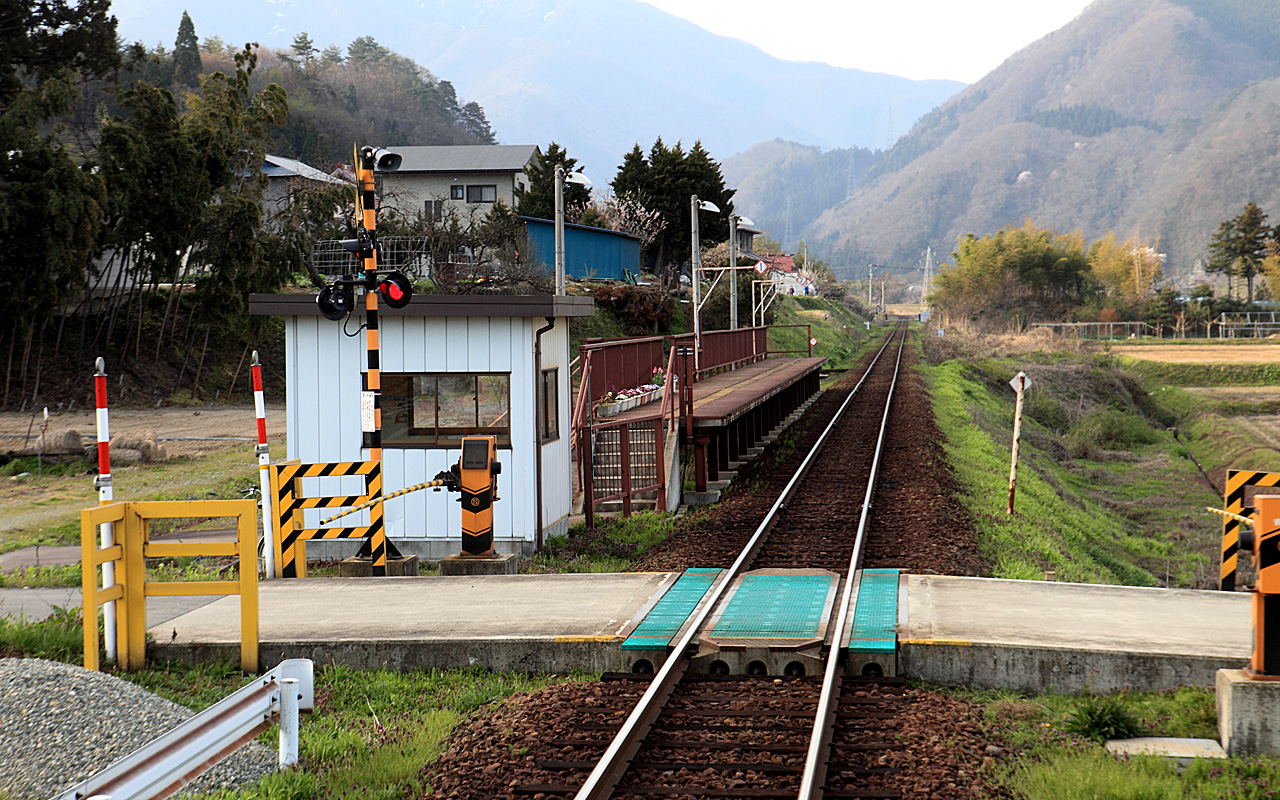
- Amaya Station in May 2010

General information
- Location: Oto-cho, Miyauchi 376-1, Aizuwakamatsu-shi, Fukushima-ken 969-5113; Japan
- Coordinates: 37.4167°N 139.9178°E
- Operator: Aizu Railway
- Line: ■Aizu Line
- Distance: 7.8 km from Nishi-Wakamatsu
- Platforms: 1 side platform
- Tracks: 1

Other information
- Status: Unstaffed
- Website: Official website

History
- Opened: October 7, 1999

Services
Preceding station	Aizu Railway	Following station
Ashinomaki-Onsen towards Aizukōgen-Ozeguchi	Aizu Line Local	Monden towards Aizu-Wakamatsu
Location
- Location within Fukushima Prefecture Location within Japan

Amaya Station (あまや駅, Amaya-eki) is a railway station on the Aizu Railway Aizu Line in the city of Aizuwakamatsu, Fukushima Prefecture, Japan, operated by the Aizu Railway.

== Lines ==
Amaya Station is served by the Aizu Line, and is located 7.8 rail kilometers from the official starting point of the line at Nishi-Wakamatsu.

== Station layout ==
Amaya Station has one side platform serving a single bi-directional track. There is no station building, but only a shelter by the platform. The station is unattended.

== History ==
Amaya Station opened on October 7, 1999.

== Surrounding area ==
- National Route 49

== See also ==
- List of railway stations in Japan
