= Aizu-Sanson-Dōjō Station =

Railway station in Minamiaizu, Fukushima Prefecture, Japan

Aizu-Sanson-Dōjō Station 会津山村道場駅
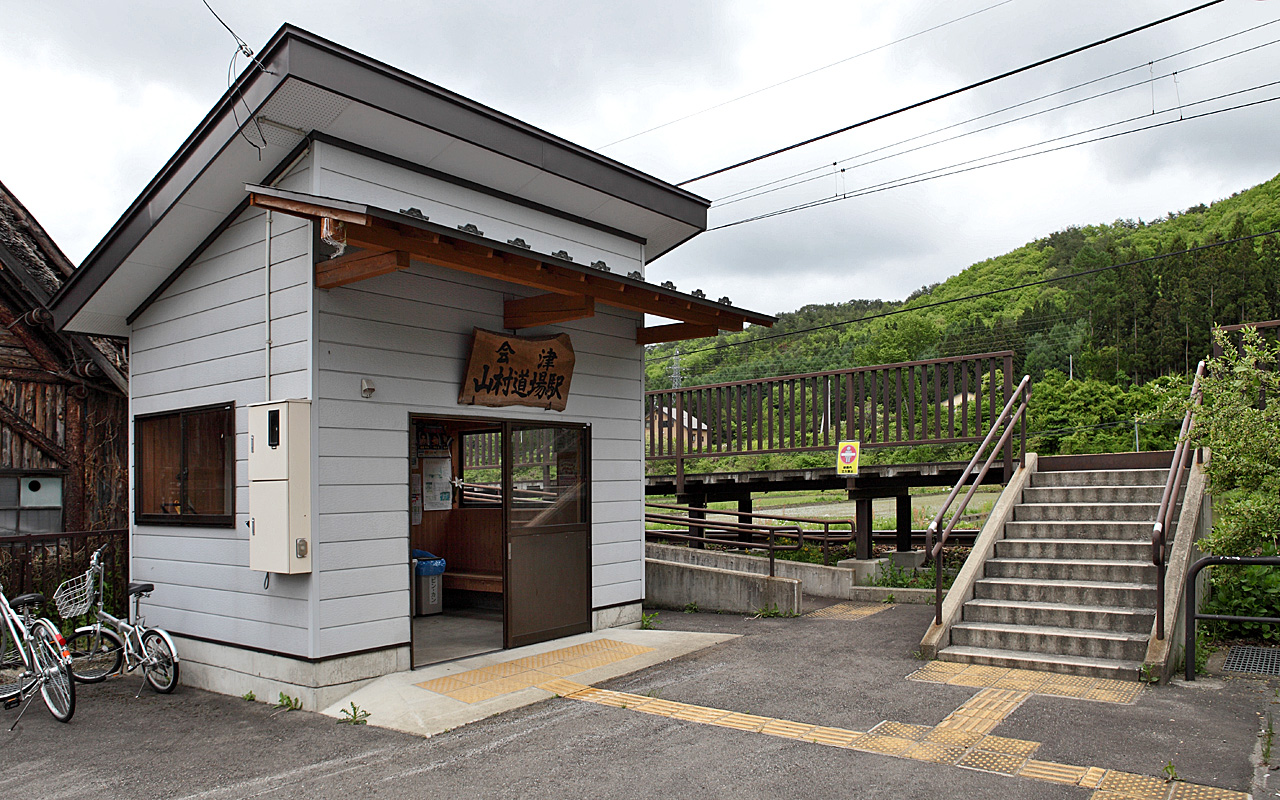
- Aizu-Sanson-Dōjō Station in May 2005

General information
- Location: Itozawa Imaizumidaira 43-1, Minamiaizu-machi, Minamiaizu-gun, Fukushima-ken 967-0014; Japan
- Coordinates: 37°08′41″N 139°43′55″E
- Operator: Aizu Railway
- Line: ■Aizu Line
- Distance: 50.1 km from Nishi-Wakamatsu
- Platforms: 1
- Tracks: 1

Other information
- Status: Unstaffed
- Website: Official website

History
- Opened: July 19, 2001

Services
| Preceding station | Aizu Railway | Following station |
|---|---|---|
| Nanatsugatake-Tozanguchi towards Aizukōgen-Ozeguchi | Aizu Line Local | Aizu-Arakai towards Aizu-Wakamatsu |
Location
- Location within Fukushima Prefecture Location within Japan

Aizu-Sanson-Dōjō Station (会津山村道場駅, Aizu-Sanson-Dōjō-eki) is a railway station on the Aizu Railway Aizu Line in the town of Minamiaizu, Minamiaizu District, Fukushima Prefecture, Japan, operated by the Aizu Railway.

== Lines ==
Aizu-Sanson-Dōjō Station is served by the Aizu Line, and is located 50.1 rail kilometers from the official starting point of the line at Nishi-Wakamatsu.

== Station layout ==
Aizu-Sanson-Dōjō Station has a single side platform serving a single bi-directional track. The station is unattended.

== History ==
Aizu-Sanson-Dōjō Station opened on July 19, 2001.

== Surrounding area ==
- National Route 121

== See also ==
- List of railway stations in Japan
