= Furusato-Kōen Station =

Railway station in Shimogō, Fukushima Prefecture, Japan

Furusato-Kōen Station ふるさと公園駅
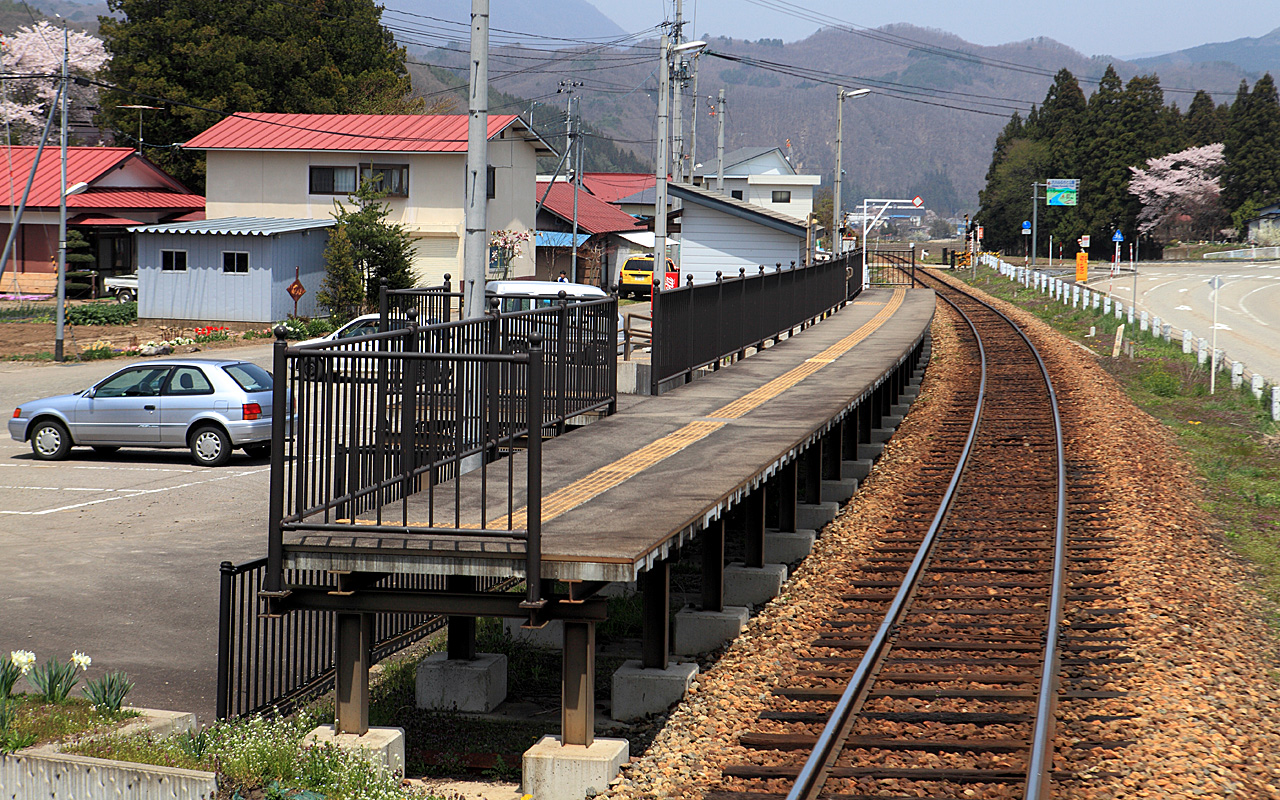
- Furusato-Kōen Station in May 2010

General information
- Location: Sawada Shimosawada ko 2082, Shimogō-machi, Minamiaizu-gun, Fukushima-ken 969-5344; Japan
- Coordinates: 37°14′35″N 139°51′32″E
- Operator: Aizu Railway
- Line: ■Aizu Line
- Distance: 32.5 km from Nishi-Wakamatsu
- Platforms: 1
- Tracks: 1

Other information
- Status: Unstaffed
- Website: Official website

History
- Opened: August 29, 2002

Services
Preceding station	Aizu Railway	Following station
Yōson-Kōen towards Aizukōgen-Ozeguchi	Aizu Line Local	Aizu-Shimogō towards Aizu-Wakamatsu
Location
- Location within Fukushima Prefecture Location within Japan

Furusato-Kōen Station (ふるさと公園駅, Furusato-Kōen-eki) is a railway station on the Aizu Railway Aizu Line in the town of Shimogō, Minamiaizu District, Fukushima Prefecture, Japan, operated by the Aizu Railway.

== Lines ==
Furusato-Kōen Station is served by the Aizu Line, and is located 32.5 rail kilometers from the official starting point of the line at Nishi-Wakamatsu.

== Station layout ==
Furusato-Kōen Station has one side platform serving a single bi-directional track. The station is unattended.

== History ==
Furusato-Kōen Station opened on August 29, 2002.

== Surrounding area ==
- Okawa Furusato-Kōen
- National Route 121

== See also ==
- List of railway stations in Japan
