= Ashinomaki-Onsen-Minami Station =

Railway station in Aizuwakamatsu, Fukushima Prefecture, Japan

Coordinates: 37°20′04″N 139°55′07″E

Ashinomaki-Onsen-Minami Station 芦ノ牧温泉南駅
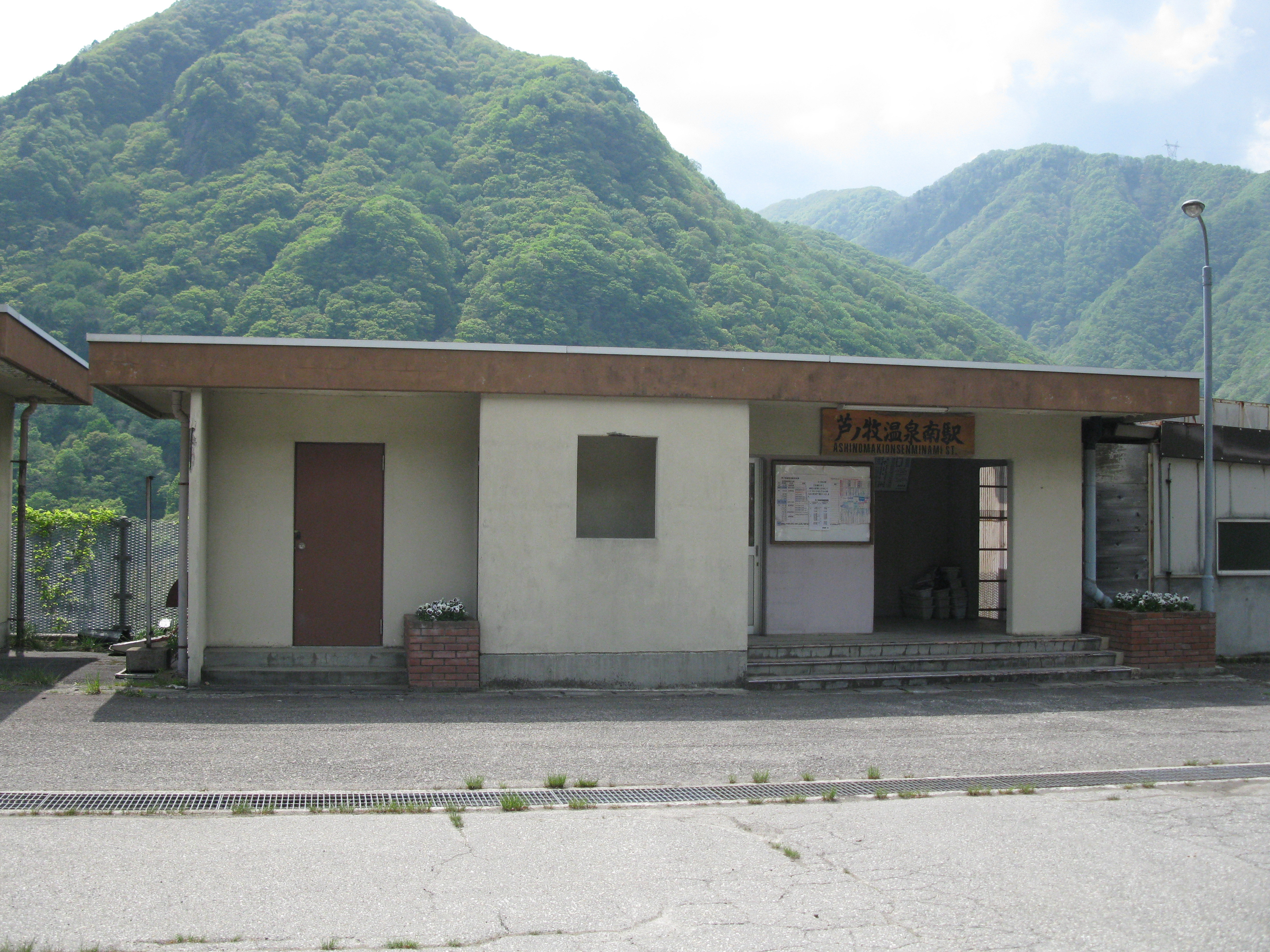
- Ashinomaki-Onsen-Minami Station in May 2011

General information
- Location: Oto-cho, Ōkawa Ohira ko 391-4, Aizuwakamatsu, Fukushima （福島県会津若松市大戸町大字大川字大平甲391-4） Japan
- Operator: Aizu Railway
- Line: Aizu Line

History
- Opened: 1932
- Former names: Kubara (until 1987)

Services
Preceding station	Aizu Railway	Following station
Yunokami-Onsen towards Aizukōgen-Ozeguchi	Aizu Line Local	Ōkawa-Dam-Kōen towards Aizu-Wakamatsu
Location

Ashinomaki-Onsen-Minami Station (芦ノ牧温泉南駅, Ashinomaki-Onsen-Minami-eki) is a railway station on the Aizu Railway Aizu Line in Aizuwakamatsu, Fukushima Prefecture, Japan, operated by the Aizu Railway.

== Lines ==
Ashinomaki-Onsen-Minami Station is served by the Aizu Line, and is located 17.7 rail kilometers from the official starting point of the line at Nishi-Wakamatsu Station.

== Station layout ==
Ashinomaki-Onsen-Minami Station has a single side platform serving traffic in both directions. The station is unattended.

== History ==
Ashinomaki-Onsen-Minami Station opened on December 22, 1932, as Kuwabara Station (桑原駅, Kuwabara-eki). The station was transferred to the Aizu Railway on 16 July 1987.

== Surrounding area ==
- Japan National Route 118
