= Minami-Wakamatsu Station =

Railway station in Aizuwakamatsu, Fukushima Prefecture, Japan

Minami-Wakamatsu Station 南若松駅
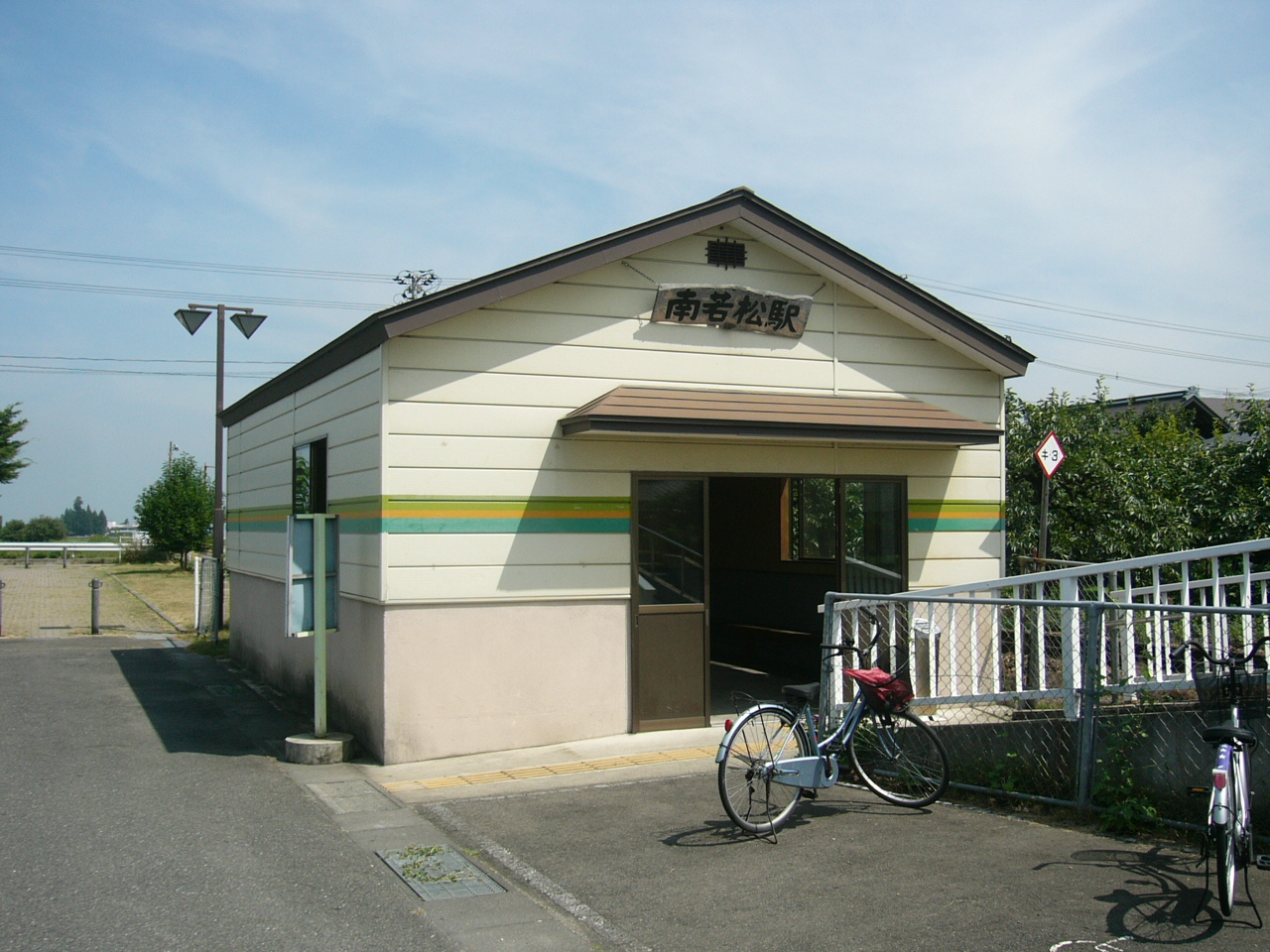
- Minami-Wakamatsu Station in August 2006

General information
- Location: Monden-cho, Aizuwakamatsu, Fukushima （福島県会津若松市門田町） Japan
- Coordinates: 37.4588°N 139.9145°E
- Operator: Aizu Railway
- Line: ■Aizu Line
- Distance: 3.0 km from Nishi-Wakamatsu
- Platforms: 1 side platform
- Tracks: 1

Other information
- Status: Unstaffed
- Website: Official website

History
- Opened: August 10, 1995.

Services
Preceding station	Aizu Railway	Following station
Monden towards Aizukōgen-Ozeguchi	Aizu Line Local	Nishi-Wakamatsu towards Aizu-Wakamatsu
Location
- Location within Fukushima Prefecture Location within Japan

Minami-Wakamatsu Station (南若松駅, Minami-Wakamatsu-eki) is a railway station on the Aizu Railway Aizu Line in the city of Aizuwakamatsu, Fukushima Prefecture, Japan, operated by the Aizu Railway.

== Lines ==
Minami-Wakamatsu Station is served by the Aizu Line, and is located 3.0 rail kilometers from the official starting point of the line at Nishi-Wakamatsu Station.

== Station layout ==
Minami-Wakamatsu Station has one single side platform serving a single bi-directional track. The station is unattended.

== History ==
Minami-Wakamatsu Station opened on August 10, 1995.

== Surrounding area ==
- Monden Post Office
