= Aizu Line =

Railway line in Fukushima prefecture, Japan

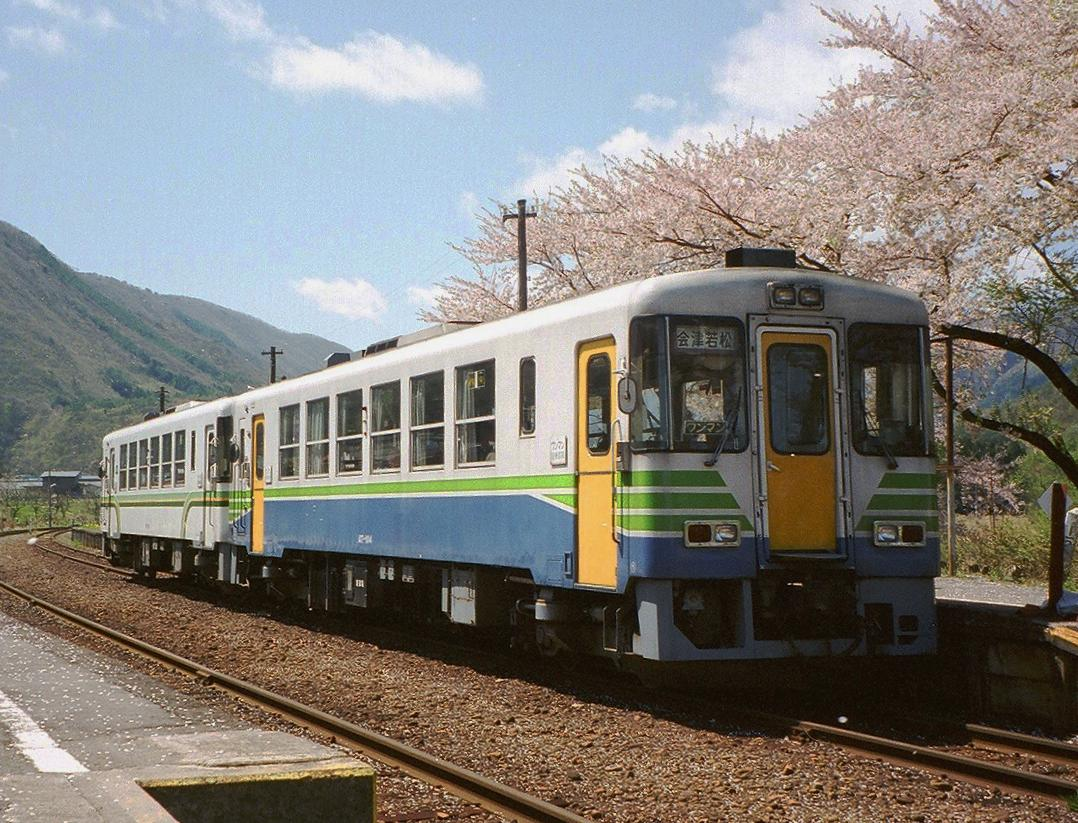
- Aizu Railway AT-150 series DMU at Ashinomaki-Onsen Station, April 2001

Overview
- Status: In operation
- Owner: Aizu Railway
- Locale: Fukushima Prefecture
- Termini: Nishi-Wakamatsu; Aizukōgen-Ozeguchi
- Stations: 21

Service
- Type: Heavy rail
- Operator: Aizu Railway

History
- Opened: 1 November 1927; 99 years ago

Technical
- Line length: 57.4 km (35.7 mi)
- Num of tracks: Entire line single tracked
- Character: Rural
- Track gauge: 1,067 mm (3 ft 6 in)
- Electrification: 1,500 V DC (Aizu-Tajima — Aizukōgen-Ozeguchi)
- Operating speed: 85 km/h (53 mph)

The Aizu Railway Aizu Line (会津鉄道会津線, Aizu Tetsudō Aizu-sen) is a 57.4 km (35.7 mi) long railway line from Nishi-Wakamatsu Station in Aizuwakamatsu to Aizukōgen-Ozeguchi Station in Minamiaizu, Fukushima, Japan. It is owned and operated by Aizu Railway.

== Services ==
The train operation is controlled from Aizu-Tajima Station. The electrified southern part goes beyond the Aizukōgen-Ozeguchi terminus onto the Yagan Railway Aizu Kinugawa Line, Tobu Railway and JR East all the way to Tokyo. The non-electrified northern part runs a diesel service beyond Nishi-Wakamatsu Station to Aizu-Wakamatsu Station on the JR East Tadami Line.

== Stations ==
- All stations are located in Fukushima Prefecture.
- Local trains stop at all stations.
- Stations stopped at by all trains are marked "●".
- Stations stopped at by some of the trains are marked "◆".
- Limited Express train Revaty Aizu (Note: Tobu Limited Express Revaty Aizu. For passengers riding only north of Kinugawa-Onsen Station, limited express tickets are not required. Passengers may sit in any seat, although must vacate if another passenger with a reservation comes. Passengers must reserve a seat and purchase an express ticket when boarding and debarking at stations between Aizu-Tajima and Asakusa (except between Aizu-Tajima and Kinugawa-Onsen only).) which goes to and departs from Asakusa Station and does not stop at any stations on the Aizu Line except Aizu-Tajima and Aizukogen-Ozeguchi Station.
- The service called Sightseeing Rapid, Open-car "torokko" Ozatoro Tenbō Ressha , is operated by Aizu Railway and/or Yagan Railway. Each separate train stops at different locations depending on its name. For example, Yu-Meguri(湯めぐり), which is operated by Yagan Railway runs from Kinugawaonsen Station to Aizu-Tajima Station. As another example, Aizu Roman (会津浪漫号), which is operated by Aizu Railway runs between Aizu-Tajima Station and Aizu-Wakamatsu Station. Reserving a seat on this train costs 320 yen (adult). You can choose one of three seat types (Tatami and Kotatsu, (Note: Kotatsu service is carried out service days during winter) Open Car Truck, (Note: Opening windows service is carried out on service days excluding the winter) Dome Car during which there are reclining seats). Passengers may purchase a ticket at stations where staff is present, or they may ask the train crew to sell them a ticket when they board the train.

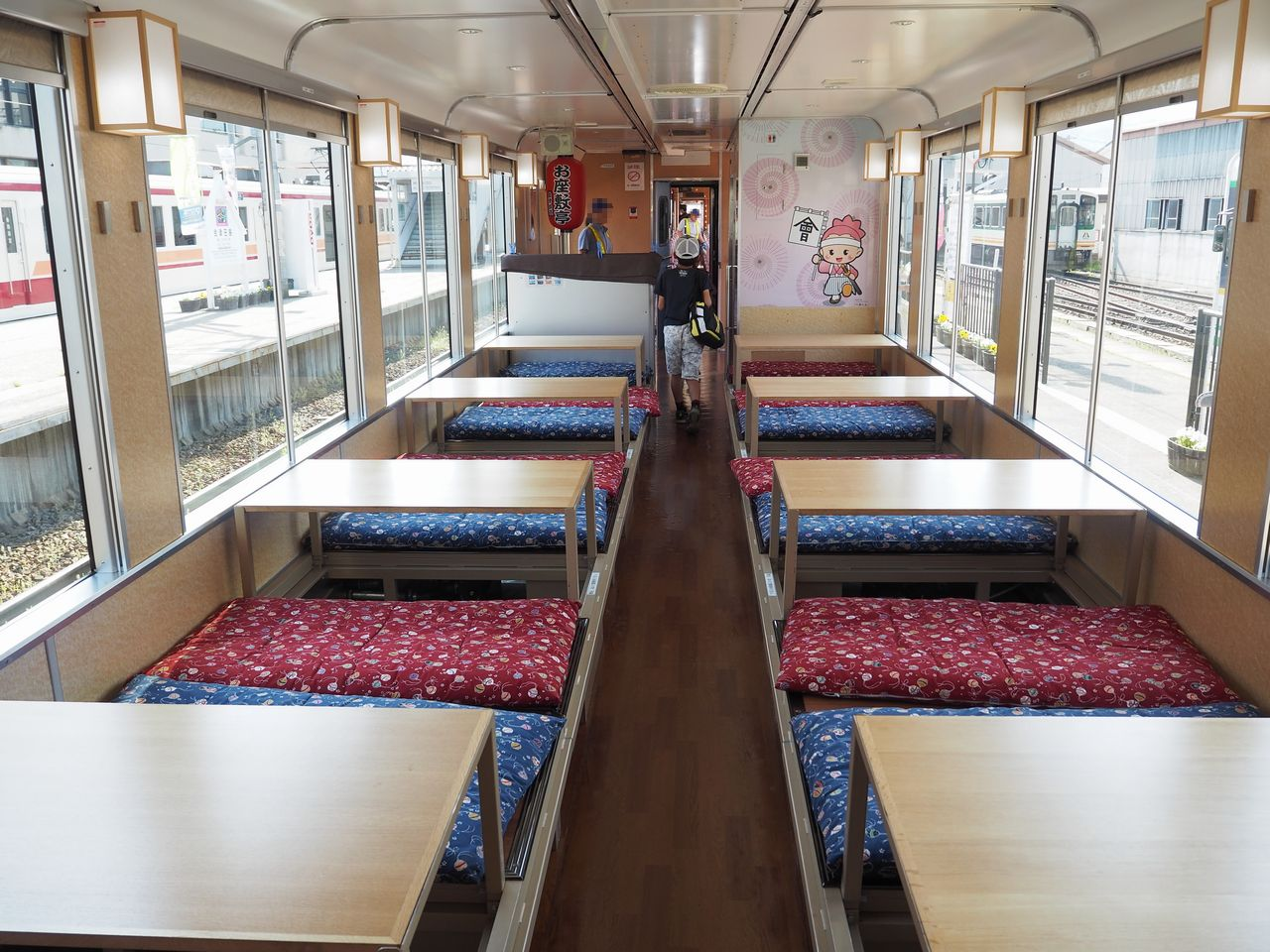
Tatami and Kotatsu (winter) seat

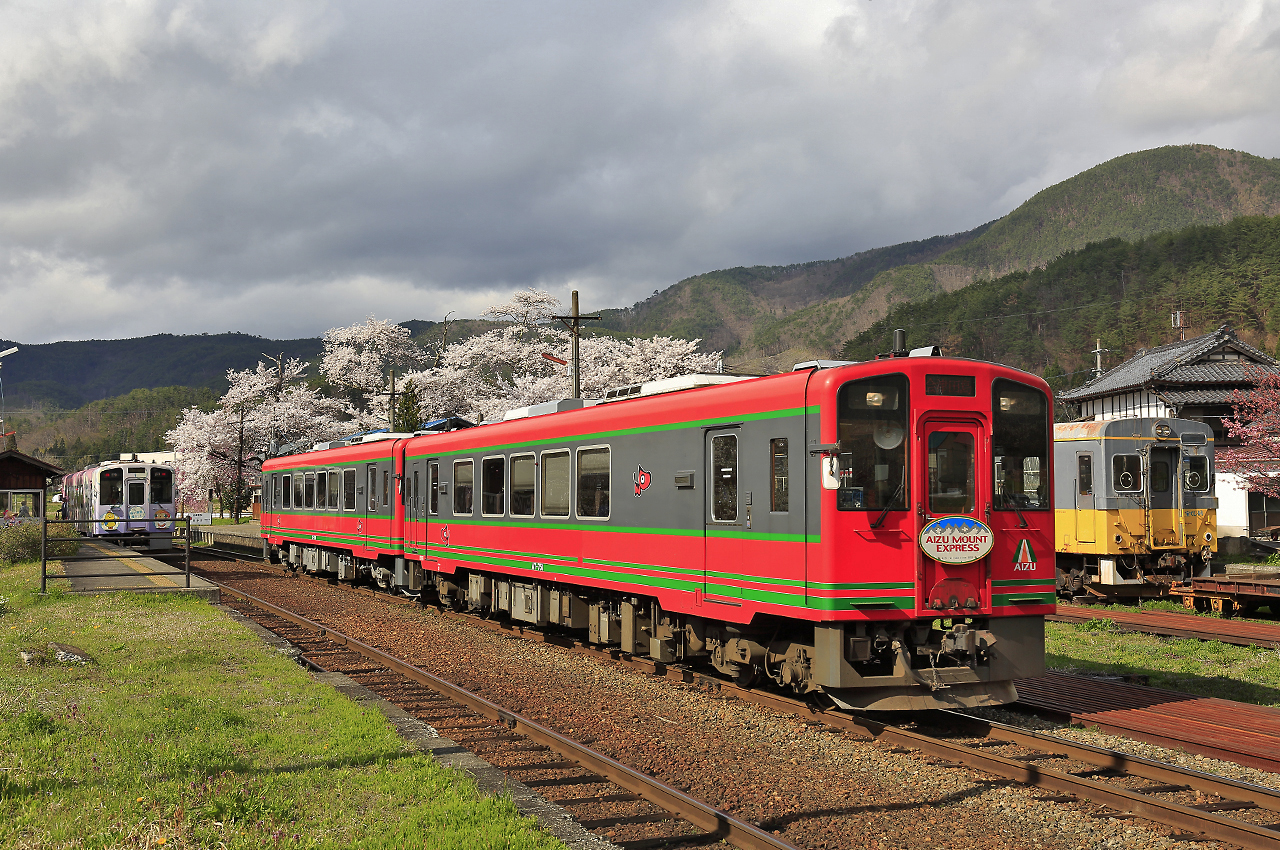
Aizu Mount Express

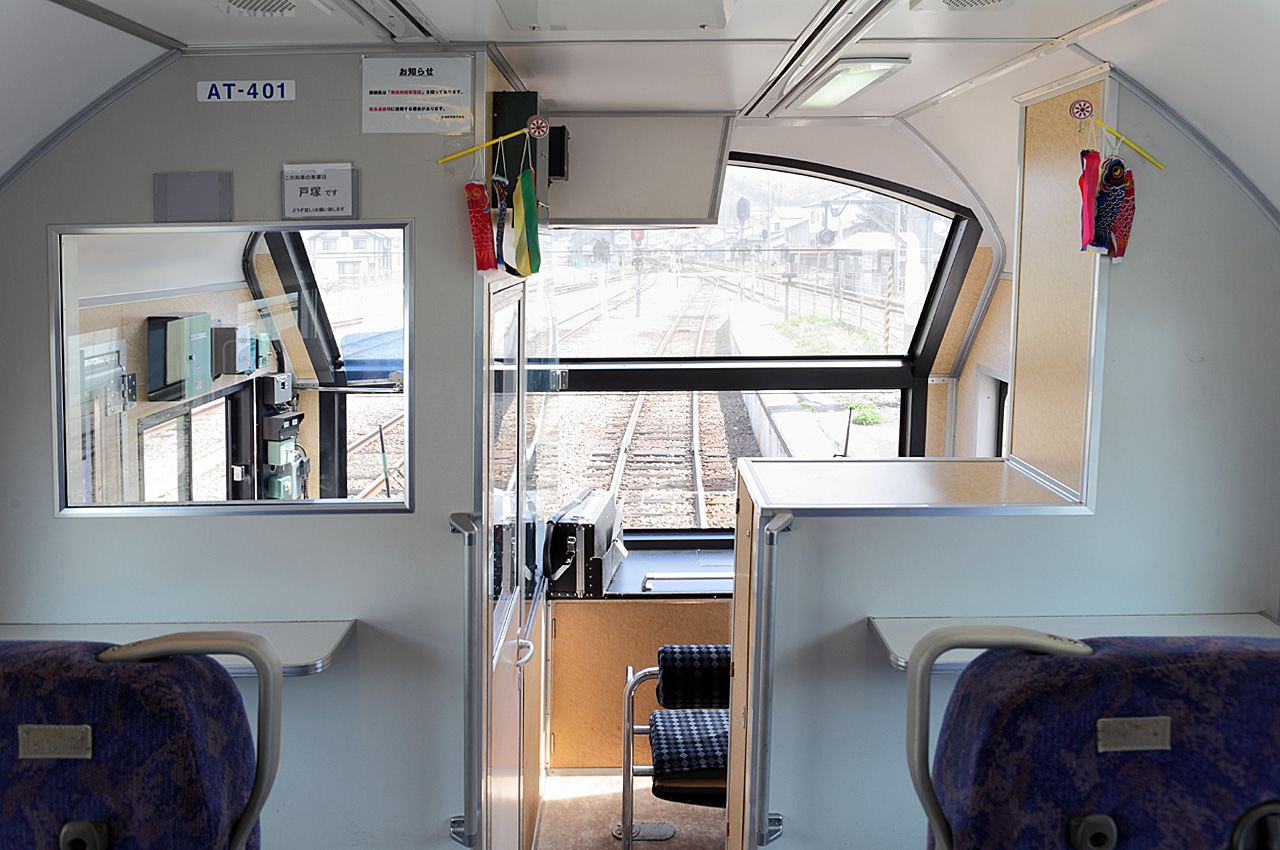
Dome Car

Station	Japanese	Distance (km)		Rapid Relay	Revaty Aizu	Aizu Mount Express	Open-car "torokko" Ozatoro Tenbō Ressha	Transfers	Location
Station	Japanese	Between stations	Total	Rapid Relay	Revaty Aizu	Aizu Mount Express	Open-car "torokko" Ozatoro Tenbō Ressha	Transfers	Location
↑through service to/from Aizu-Wakamatsu on the Tadami Line↑
Nishi-Wakamatsu	西若松	-	0.0	●		●	●	■ Tadami Line (for Koide)	Aizuwakamatsu
Minami-Wakamatsu	南若松	3.0	3.0	↕		●	↕		Aizuwakamatsu
Monden	門田	1.9	4.9	↕		●	↕		Aizuwakamatsu
Amaya	あまや	2.8	7.7	↕		●	↕		Aizuwakamatsu
Ashinomaki-Onsen	芦ノ牧温泉	2.8	10.5	●		●	●		Aizuwakamatsu
Ōkawadamukōen	大川ダム公園	5.7	16.2	↕		●	↕		Aizuwakamatsu
Ashinomaki-Onsen-Minami	芦ノ牧温泉南	1.5	17.7	↕		●	↕		Aizuwakamatsu
Yunokami-Onsen	湯野上温泉	5.0	22.7	●		●	●		Shimogō, Minamiaizu District
Tō-no-Hetsuri	塔のへつり	3.8	26.5	●		●	●		Shimogō, Minamiaizu District
Yagoshima	弥五島	1.5	28.0	↕		●	↕		Shimogō, Minamiaizu District
Aizu-Shimogō	会津下郷	3.1	31.1	●		●	●		Shimogō, Minamiaizu District
Furusato-Kōen	ふるさと公園	1.4	32.5	↕		●	↕		Shimogō, Minamiaizu District
Yōson-Kōen	養鱒公園	2.6	35.1	↕		●	↕		Shimogō, Minamiaizu District
Aizu-Nagano	会津長野	2.2	37.3	↕		●	↕		Minamiaizu, Minamiaizu District
Tajimakōkōmae	田島高校前	2.2	39.5	↕		●	↕		Minamiaizu, Minamiaizu District
Aizu-Tajima	会津田島	2.5	42.0	●	●	●	●		Minamiaizu, Minamiaizu District
Nakaarai	中荒井	3.8	45.8		↕	◆	↑		Minamiaizu, Minamiaizu District
Aizu-Arakai	会津荒海	3.4	49.2		↕	◆	↑		Minamiaizu, Minamiaizu District
Aizu-Sanson-Dōjō	会津山村道場	0.9	50.1		↕	◆	↑		Minamiaizu, Minamiaizu District
Nanatsugatake-Tozanguchi	七ヶ岳登山口	3.0	53.1		↕	◆	↑		Minamiaizu, Minamiaizu District
Aizukōgen-Ozeguchi	会津高原尾瀬口	4.3	57.4		●	●	●	■ Yagan Railway Aizu Kinugawa Line (through operation)	Minamiaizu, Minamiaizu District
↓through service to/from Yagan Railway Aizu Kinugawa Line↓

== History ==
The Aizu Line was constructed between 1927 and 1953 by the Japanese National Railways (JNR) as part of a plan to build a direct line from Aizu-Wakamatsu to Tokyo. The Aizu Line was the northern section, whilst the Yagan Railway Aizu Kinugawa Line was to be the southern section. Despite the Kinugawa line connecting to the Aizu Line in 1986, the Aizu Line was deemed an unprofitable secondary line and transferred to a company established by local governments in 1987.

The Aizukōgen-Ozeguchi - Aizu-Tajima section was electrified at 1500V DC in 1990 to facilitate through-running onto the Kinugawa line.

=== Timeline ===
- November 1, 1927: Nishi-Wakamatsu - Kamimiyori (Ashinomaki Onsen since 1987) section (10.5 km) opens as Yagan'u Line
- December 22, 1932: Kamimiyori (Ashinomaki Onsen) - Yunokami (Yunokami Onsen since 1987) section opens
- December 27, 1934: Yunokami - Aizu-Tajima section opens
- by 1942: Yagan'u Line and Aizu Line (Aizu-Wakamatsu – Aizu-Miyashita via Nishi-Wakamatsu) merged under the name Aizu Line
- December 12, 1947: Aizu-Tajima - Arakai (Aizu-Arakai since 1987) section opens
- November 8, 1953: Arakai - Aizu-Takinohara (Aizukōgen-Ozeguchi since 1987) section opens
- by 1971: Aizu Line split, with Aizu-Wakamatsu – Aizu-Miyashita – Tadami section becoming the Tadami Line, and the Nishi-Wakamatsu – Aizu-Takinohara section retaining the Aizu Line name
- December 1, 1980: The 12.2 km deviation between Kamimiyori and Yunokami opens as part of the construction of the Okawa Dam
- April 1, 1987: Line transferred to East Japan Railway Company (JR East) upon privatization of JNR
- July 16, 1987: Line transferred to Aizu Railway
- October 12, 1990: Aizu-Tajima — Aizukōgen-Ozeguchi section electrified (1500 V DC), direct service to the Yagan Railway Aizu Kinugawa Line begins
- April 1, 1999: Japan Freight Railway Company (JR Freight) ends operations
- April 22, 2017: Revaty Aizu uses Tobu 500 series which belongs to Tobu Railway has been commenced operating.
- March 12, 2022: Revaty Aizu has been the only electric train as a train, which runs on Aizu Line because Aizu Railway stopped interconnecting with Yagan Railway except for Revaty Aizu. Simultaneously, Aizu Railway lost the only electric train that Tobu 6050-100 series.
