= Aizu-Tajima Station =

Railway station in Minamiaizu, Fukushima Prefecture, Japan

Aizu-Tajima Station 会津田島駅
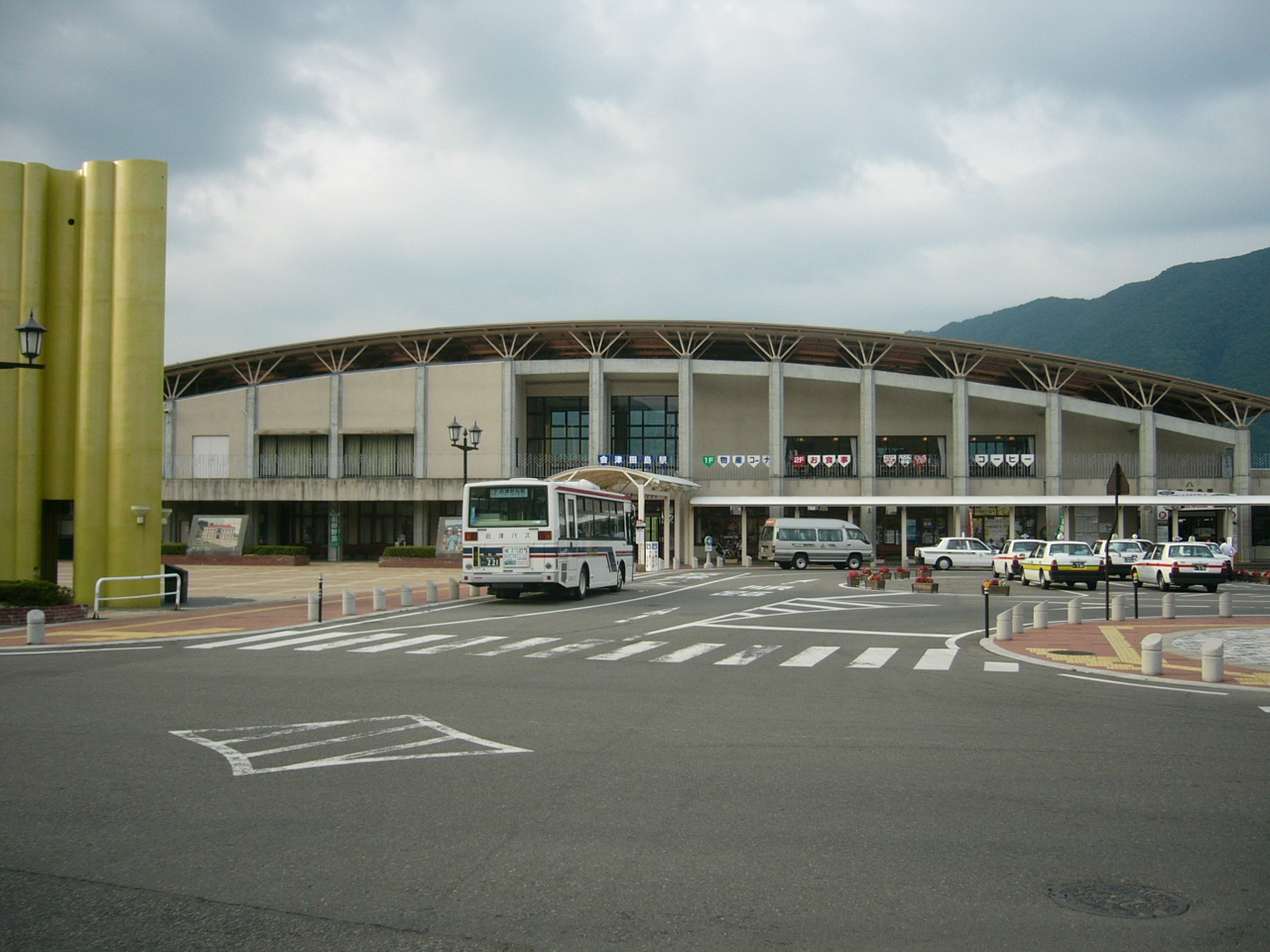
- Aizu-Tajima Station in June 2006

General information
- Location: Tajima Nishibanba ko 358-3, Minamiaizu-machi, Minamiaizu-gun, Fukushima-ken 967-0004; Japan
- Coordinates: 37.2034°N 139.7743°E
- Operator: Aizu Railway
- Line: ■Aizu Line
- Distance: 42.0 km from Nishi-Wakamatsu
- Platforms: 2
- Tracks: 4

Other information
- Status: Staffed
- Website: Official website

History
- Opened: December 27, 1934

Services
Preceding station	Aizu Railway	Following station
Aizukōgen-Ozeguchi Terminus	Aizu	Terminus
Terminus	Aizu Line Rapid Relay	Aizu-Shimogō towards Aizu-Wakamatsu
Nakaarai towards Aizukōgen-Ozeguchi	Aizu Line Local	Tajimakōkōmae towards Aizu-Wakamatsu
Location

Aizu-Tajima Station (会津田島駅, Aizu-Tajima-eki) is a railway station on the Aizu Railway Aizu Line in the town of Minamiaizu, Minamiaizu District, Fukushima Prefecture, Japan, operated by the Aizu Railway. It is the terminus for all EMU through services from the Yagan Railway, as the section between this station and Nishi-Wakamatsu is not electrified.

== Lines ==
Aizu-Tajima Station is served by the Aizu Line, and is located 42.0 rail kilometers from the official starting point of the line at Nishi-Wakamatsu.

== Station layout ==
Aizu-Tajima Station has two island platforms; however, platform 1 nearest the station building deadheads to a bay platform. Platforms 3 and 4 are connected by a footbridge.

=== Platforms ===
1	■ Aizu Railway Aizu Line	for Aizukōgen-Ozeguchi
2/3	■ Aizu Railway Aizu Line	<express trains only>
4	■ Aizu Railway Aizu Line	for Yunokami-Onsen, Nishi-Wakamatsu

== History ==
Aizu-Tajima Station opened on December 27, 1934.

The station was transferred to the Aizu Railway on 16 July 1987.

== Surrounding area ==
- Minamiaizu Town Hall
- Tajima Post Office
- National Route 121
- National Route 298
- National Route 400

== Bus routes ==
- Aizu Bus
  - [No.42] Aizu-Tajima Station - Minami Aizu Hospital - Haryu - Yamaguchi - Uchikawa (Note: Transfer onto buses bound for Aizukogen-Ozeguchi Station or Oze National Park at this bus stop)
  - Aizu-Tajima Station - Aizu-Shimogo Station - Yunokamionsen Station - Ōuchijuku - Konumazaki - Edamatsu (Note: The walk brings from this bus stop to Sakamoto-bashi bus stop at 30 minutes for 3km, are able to transfer onto Fukushima Transportation bound for Sukagawa Station.)
  - Aizu-Tajima Station - Tajima Highschool
- Kaneko Kanko Bus
  - Aizu-Tajima Station - Minami Aizu Hospital - Showa Onsen (Note: Transfer onto buses bound for Aizu-Kawaguchi Station or Ōashi) - Matsuyama (Suspension during winter due to heavy snow)
- Shizen Shuto・Tadami
  - Aizu-Tajima Station - Minami Aizu Hospital - Kobayashi Snow Station - Aizu Tadami Archaeological Museum - Ki no Sato YURARI - Tadami Junior Highschool - Tadami Station
    - A flat rate of fares at 1500 yen

== In media ==
The 4th episode of the TV series "Tetsu Ota Michiko, 20,000 km" is dedicated to this station

== See also ==
- List of railway stations in Japan
