= Nishi-Wakamatsu Station =

Railway station in Aizuwakamatsu, Fukushima Prefecture, Japan

Nishi-Wakamatsu Station 西若松駅
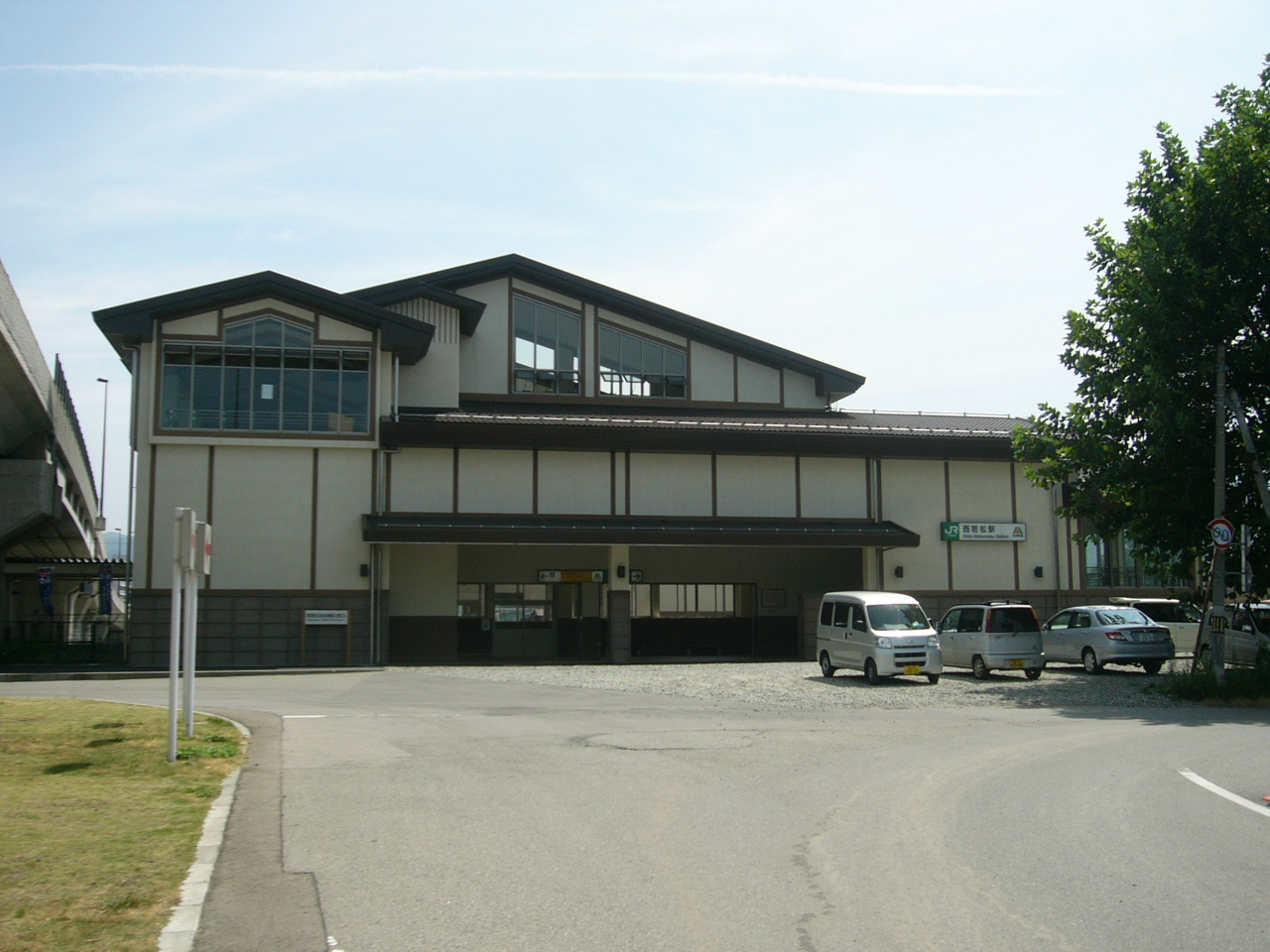
- West side of Nishi-Wakamatsu Station in August 2006

General information
- Location: 1-4-1 Zaimoku-cho, Aizuwakamatsu-shi, Fukushima-ken 965-0853; Japan
- Coordinates: 37.4858°N 139.9143°E
- Operator: JR East; Aizu Railway
- Lines: ■ Tadami Line; ■ Aizu Line
- Platforms: 1 side + 1 island platform
- Tracks: 3

Other information
- Status: Staffed
- Website: Official website

History
- Opened: October 15, 1926

Passengers
- FY2017: 586 (JR)

Services
Preceding station	JR East	Following station
Aizu-Hongō towards Koide	Tadami Line	Nanukamachi towards Aizu-Wakamatsu
Preceding station	Aizu Railway	Following station
Ashinomaki-Onsen towards Aizu-Tajima	Aizu Line Rapid Relay	Nanukamachi towards Aizu-Wakamatsu
Minami-Wakamatsu towards Aizukōgen-Ozeguchi	Aizu Line Local	Nanukamachi towards Aizu-Wakamatsu
Location
- Location within JR Tadami Line Location within Fukushima Prefecture Location within Japan

Nishi-Wakamatsu Station (西若松駅, Nishi-Wakamatsu-eki) is a railway station on the Tadami Line in the city of Aizuwakamatsu, Fukushima Prefecture, Japan, operated by East Japan Railway Company (JR East). Nishi-Wakamatsu Station is located southwest of the center of Aizuwakamatsu.

== Lines ==
Nishi-Wakamatsu Station is served by the Tadami Line, and is located 3.1 rail kilometers from the official starting point of the line at Aizu-Wakamatsu Station. It is also served by the Aizu Railway Aizu Line, of which it is the official terminus; however, most Aizu Line trains continue to Aizu-Wakamatsu Station.

== Station layout ==
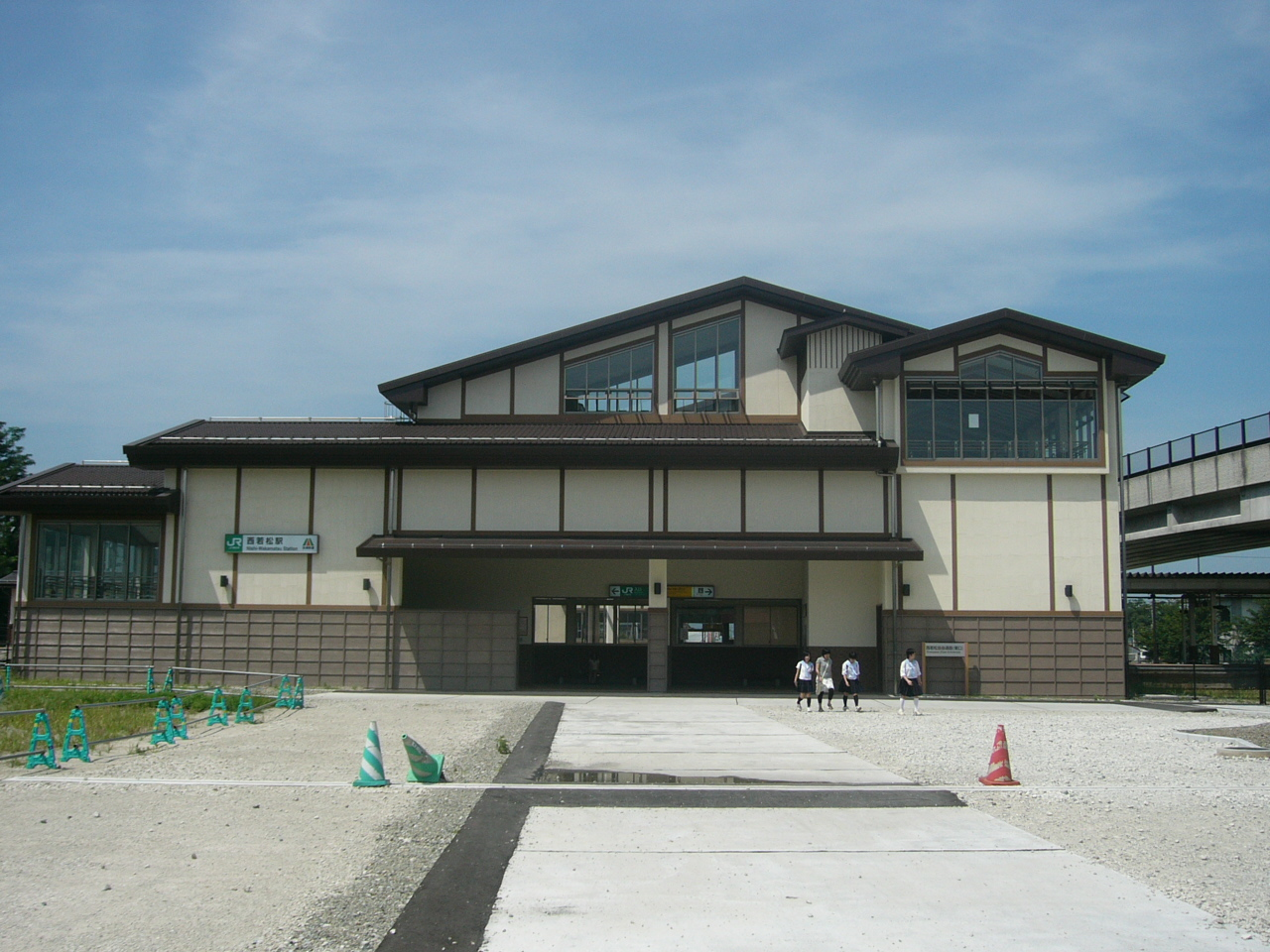
East side of the station (August 2006)

Nishi-Wakamatsu Station has a single side platform and a single island platform connected by a footbridge. The station is staffed.

=== Platforms ===
1	■ Tadami Line	for Aizu-Wakamatsu (once per day)
2	■ Tadami Line	for Aizuwakamatsu for Aizu-Bange, Aizu-Miyashita and Tadami
3	■ Aizu Line	for Aizuwakamatsu for Yunokami-Onsen, Aizu-Tajima and Aizukōgen-Ozeguchi

== History ==
Nishi-Wakamatsu Station opened on October 15, 1926, as an intermediate station on the initial eastern section of the Japanese National Railways (JNR) Tadami Line between Aizu-Wakamatsu and Aizu-Yanaizu. The station was absorbed into the JR East network upon the privatization of the JNR on April 1, 1987. A new station building was completed September 28, 2005.

== Passenger statistics ==
In fiscal 2019, the JR portion of the station was used by an average of 586 passengers daily (boarding passengers only).

The passenger statistics for previous years are below.

JR East passenger boardings
Fiscal year	Daily average
2000	714
2001	725
2002	736
2003	721
2004	712
2005	743
2006	766
2007	737
2008	719
2009	703
2010	731
2011	668
2012	669
2013	656
2014	619
2015	654
2016	644
2017	656
2018	637
2019	586

== Surrounding area ==
- Aizuwakamatsu Castle
- Wakamatsu-Zaimokumachi post office
- Aizuwakamatsu weather station
- Jyōsai Elementary School
- Aizuwakamatsu fourth Junior High School
- Aizu Senior High School
- National Route 118
- National Route 401
- Fukushima Prefectural Route 59
- Fukushima Prefectural Route 211
- Fukushima Prefectural Route 328

== See also ==
- List of railway stations in Japan
