= Aizu Railway =

Third-sector Japanese railway company

Aizu Railway Co., Ltd.

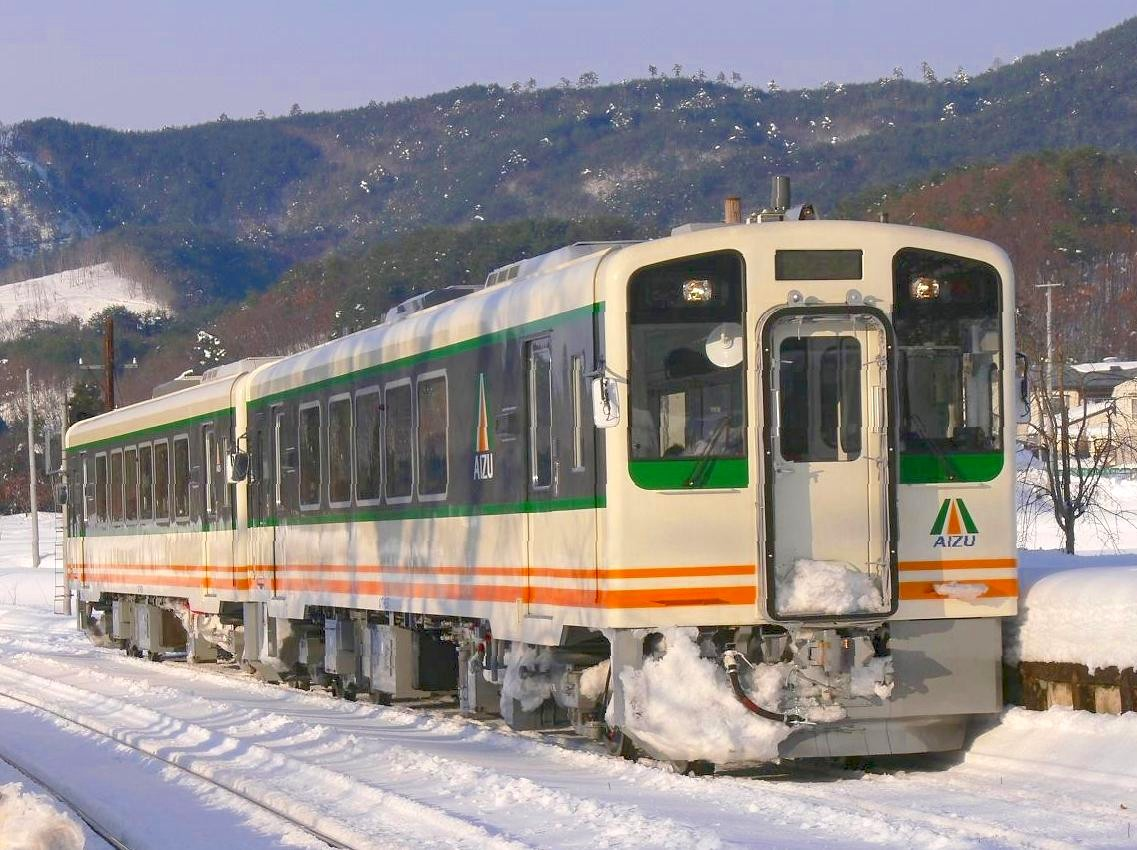
- Aizu Railway AT-650 series diesel train
- Native name: 会津鉄道株式会社
- Romanized name: Aizu tetsudō kabushiki-gaisha
- Company type: Public-private KK
- Industry: Transportation
- Founded: 10 November 1986
- Website: Official website

Aizu Railway Co., Ltd. (会津鉄道株式会社, Aizu tetsudō kabushiki-gaisha), is a third-sector Japanese railway company whose major shareholders include the Fukushima prefectural and Aizuwakamatsu city governments. It owns and operates Aizu Line as its sole railway line.

The names of the company and the line are from the Aizu area of Fukushima Prefecture that the line serves.

== History ==
- June 22, 1984 - The Aizu line is opened by Japanese National Railways.
- November 10, 1986 - Aizu Railway Co., Ltd. is established.
- 1987:
  - -Route name, new station name, company badge, etc. are determined.
  - July 16 - East Japan Railway (JR East) to convert the Aizu line Aizusen opening .
- April 27, 1988 - To-no-Hetsuri Station opens.
- October 12, 1990 - 15.4 km of the line is electrified, between Aizu-Tajima and Aizu-Kogen Ozeguchi. With this electrification, through services begin with the Tobu Kinugawa Line, Tobu Nikko Line, and the Tobu Isesaki Line.
- August 10, 1995 - Minami-Wakamatsu Station opens.
- August 7, 1999 - Amaya Station was opened.
- July 18, 2001 - Aizu-Sanson-Dojo Station opens.
- 2002
  - March 23 - Aizu Mount Express begins operation.
  - August 29 - Furusato-Koen Station opens.
- March 1, 2005 - The express "Minamiaizu" was abolished. Aizu Mount Express starts direct operation to Kinugawa Onsen Station on the Tobu Kinugawa Line.
- March 18, 2006 - Aizu Kogen Station was renamed to Aizu Kogen Ozeguchi Station.
- 2009:
  - April 18 - A concert is held outside Yunokami-Onsen station
  - August 23–24 - Rokujizo Station temporarily opens.
- August 23, 24, 2010- Ichinoseiroku Jizoson Station was temporarily opened, in the same location as Rokujizo station the previous year. This station would be opened every year until 2014.
- 2012:
  - March 17 - Aizu Mount Express begins direct operation to Tobu-Nikko Station.
  - March 25-The Yume Tour begins operating to Kinugawa-Onsen Station on the Tobu Kinugawa Line.
- April 21, 2017 - Tobu's limited express Liberty Aizu starts operations to Aizu-Tajima Station.

== Ridership ==
Annual Ridership
Year	Ridership
1992	956,000
2002	679,000
2012	403,000

== See also ==
- Rail transport in Japan
- Aizu Line, the sole line operated by the company
