= Aizu Liner =

Japanese train service

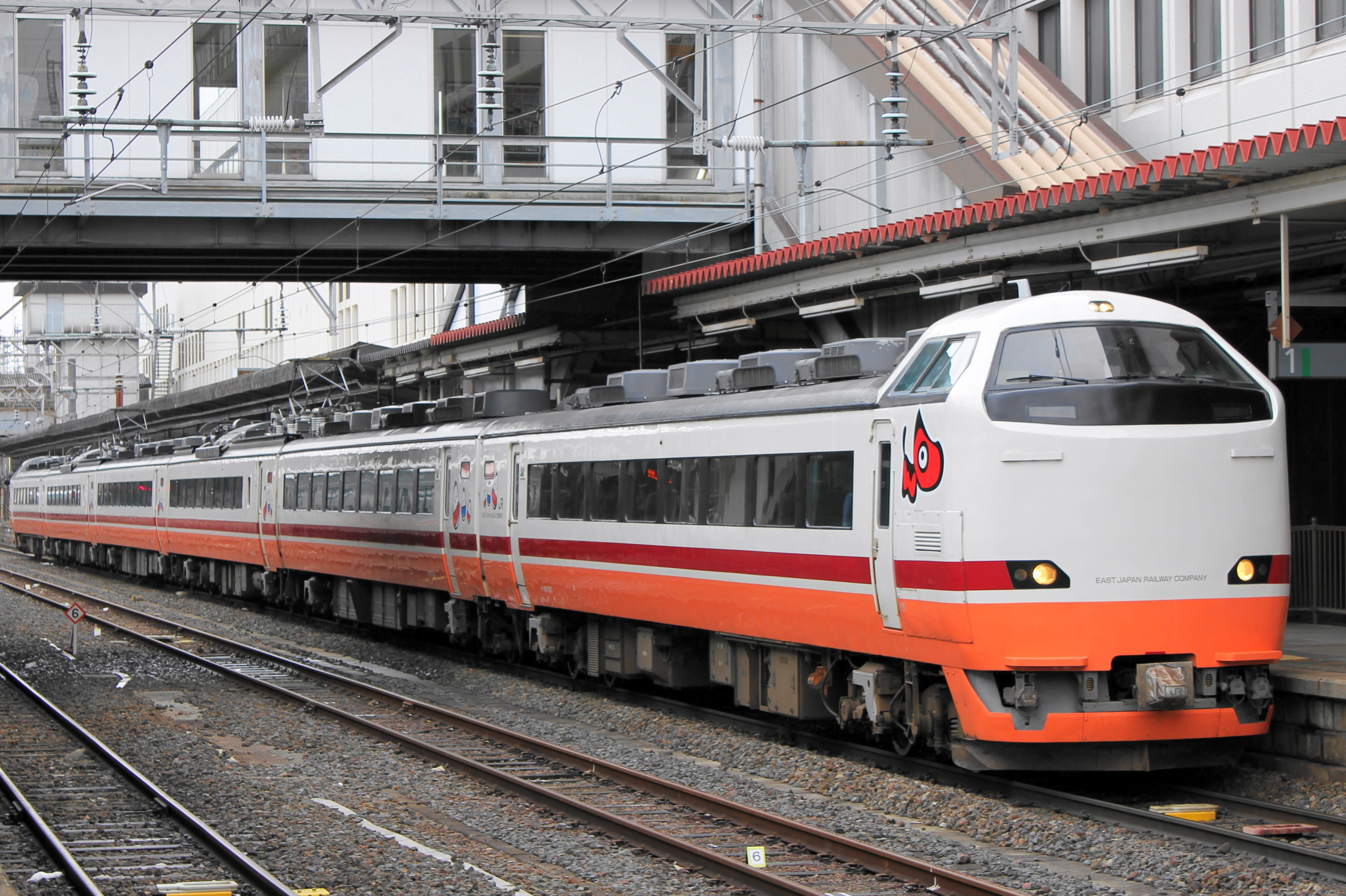
- Refurbished 485 series set G55/58 on an Aizu Liner service, March 2012

Overview
- Service type: Rapid
- Locale: Fukushima Prefecture
- Current operator(s): JR East

Route
- Termini: Kōriyama; Aizu-Wakamatsu
- Average journey time: 1 hour
- Service frequency: 3 return services daily
- Line(s) used: Banetsu West Line

On-board services
- Class(es): Standard only

Technical
- Rolling stock: 485 series/583 series EMUs
- Track gauge: 1,067 mm (3 ft 6 in)
- Electrification: 20,000 V AC overhead
- Operating speed: 95 km/h (60 mph)

The Aizu Liner (あいづライナー) was a limited-stop "Rapid" train service in Japan operated by the East Japan Railway Company (JR East) between Kōriyama and Aizu-Wakamatsu on the Banetsu West Line in Fukushima Prefecture.

== Service pattern ==
Services consist of three trains in each direction daily. Some trains are extended to run to and from Kitakata during busy seasons.

=== Station stops ===
Services stop at the following stations. Not all services stop at Kikuta Station.

Kōriyama - Kikuta - Bandai-Atami - Inawashiro - Bandaimachi - Aizu-Wakamatsu

== Rolling stock ==
Services are normally formed of a 6-car 485 series limited express-type electric multiple unit (EMU) set number G55/58 based at Sendai Depot, sometimes substituted by a 6-car 583 series EMU (set N1/2). Prior to 25 February 2012, services were normally operated by Sendai-based 6-car 485 series set A1/2.

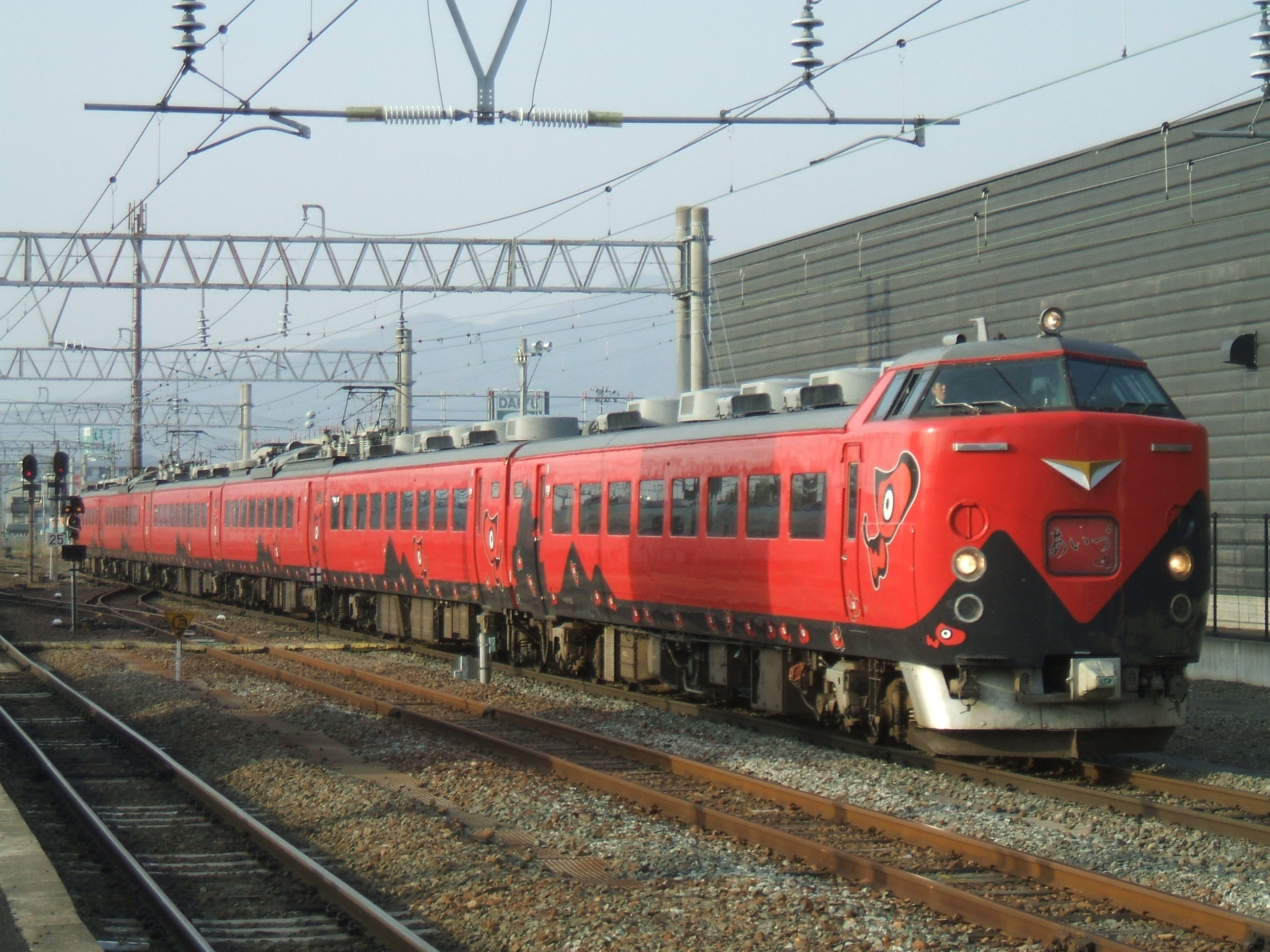
485 series set A1/2 in "Akabē" livery on an Aizu Liner service, May 2010

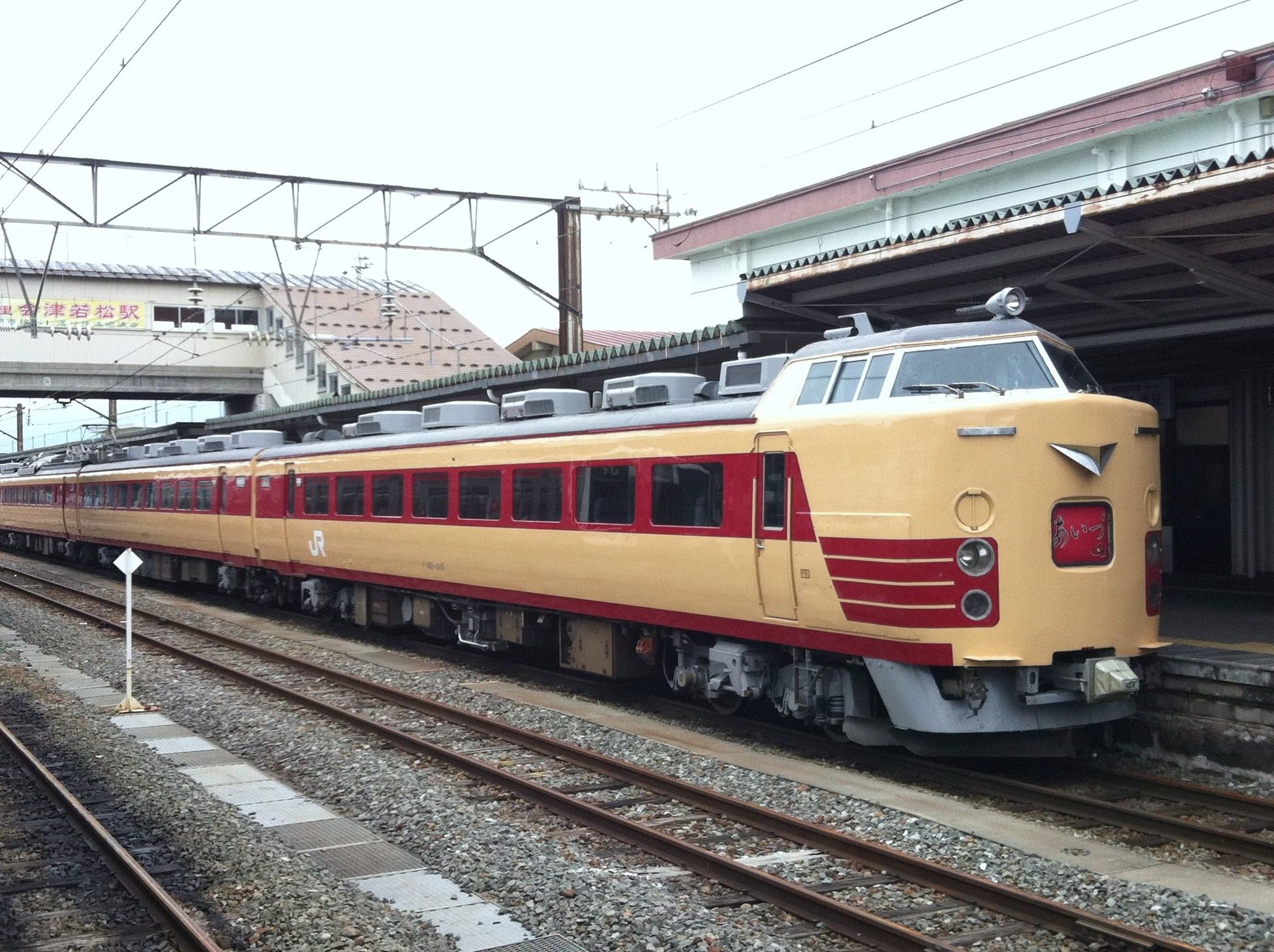
485 series set A1/2 repainted in JNR livery on an Aizu Liner service, June 2011

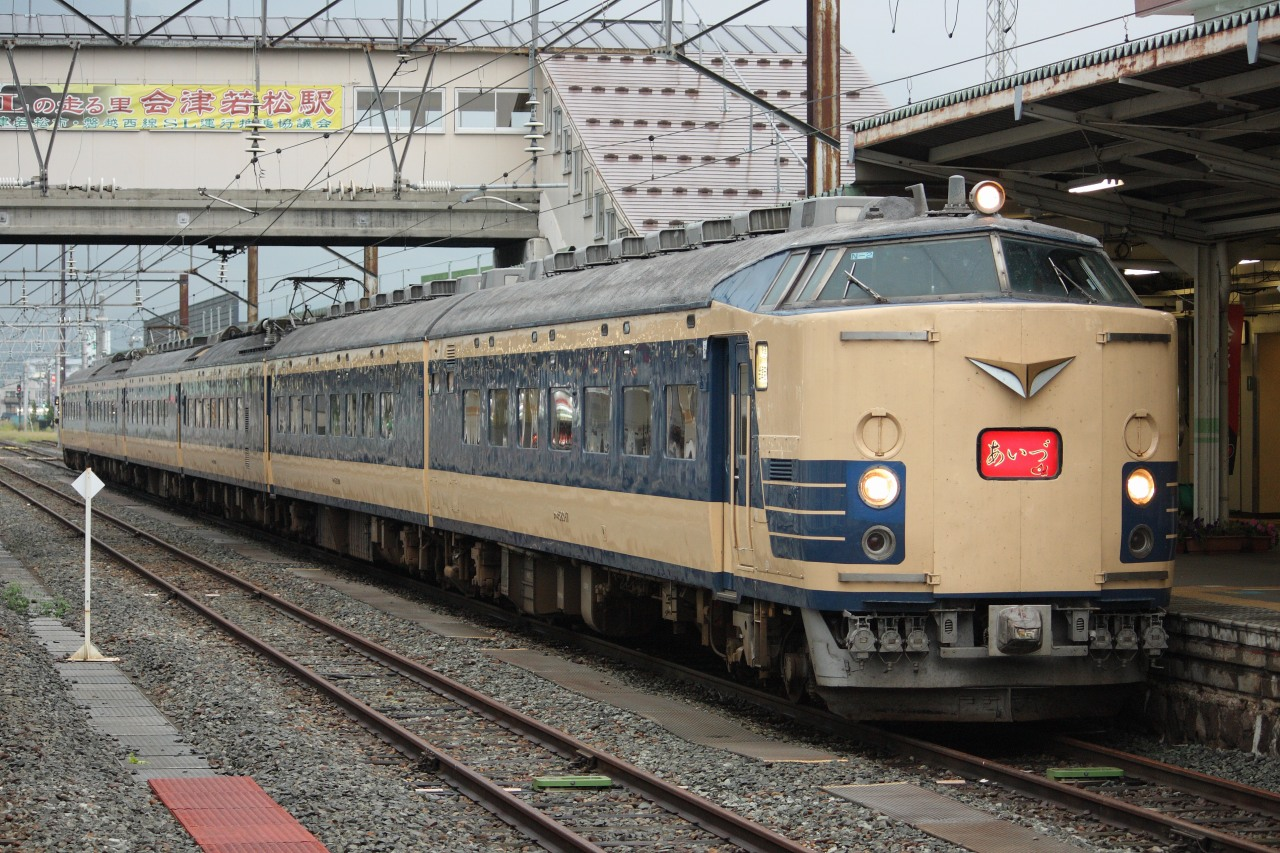
583 series EMU set N1/2 on an Aizu Liner working, September 2008

== Formations ==
Trains are formed as shown below, with car 1 at the Kōriyama end. Cars 5 and 6 are reserved-seating cars.

=== 485 series ===
Car No.	1	2	3	4	5	6
Numbering	KuHa 481	MoHa 484	MoHa 485	MoHa 484	MoHa 485	KuHa 481
Accommodation	Non-reserved	Non-reserved	Non-reserved	Non-reserved	Reserved	Reserved

=== 583 series ===
Car No.	1	2	3	4	5	6
Numbering	KuHaNe 583	MoHaNe 582	MoHaNe 583	MoHaNe 582	MoHaNe 583	KuHaNe 583
Accommodation	Non-reserved	Non-reserved	Non-reserved	Non-reserved	Reserved	Reserved

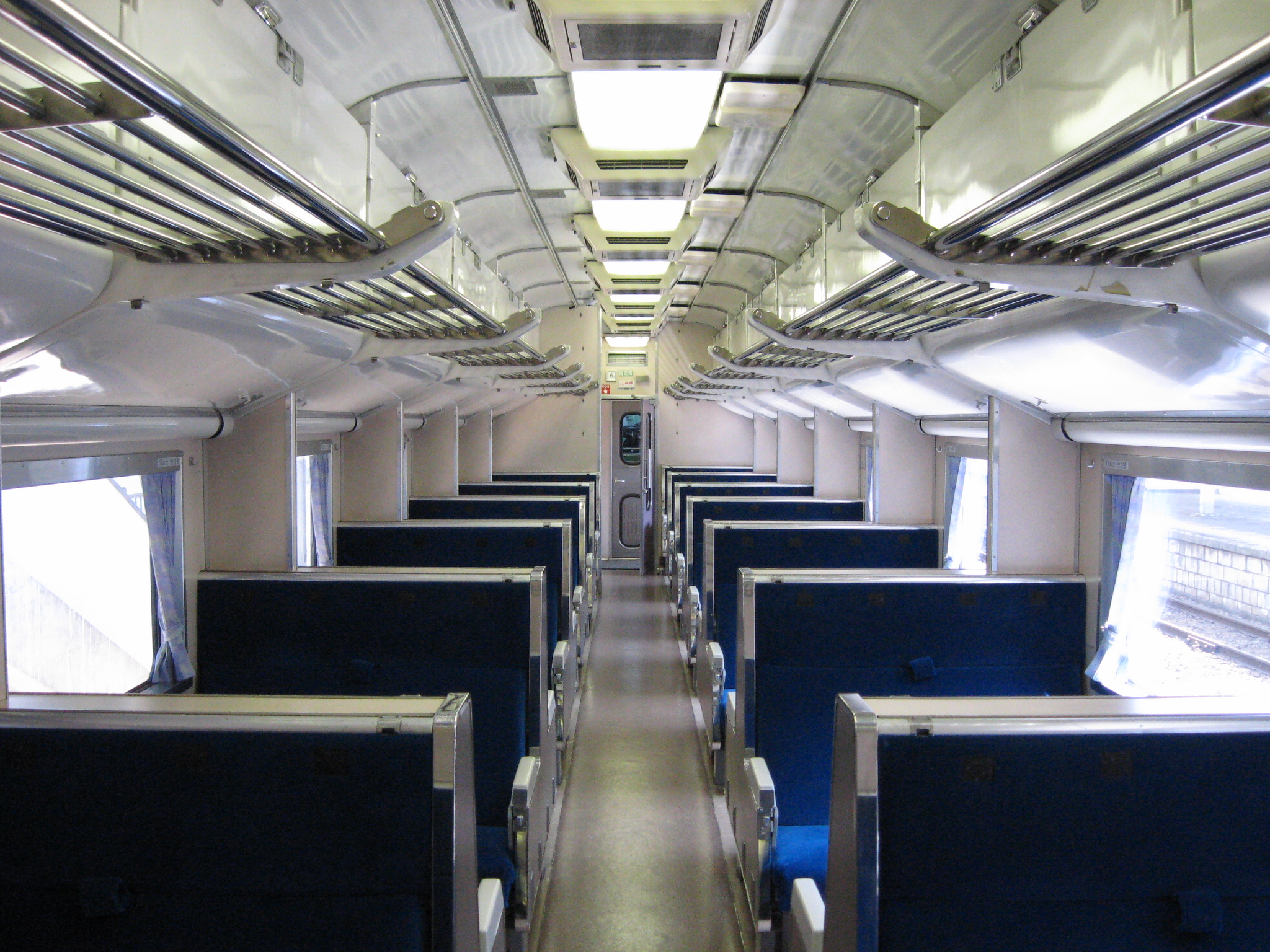
Interior of a 583 series set, with fixed 4-seat bays, May 2008

== History ==
In June 2011, the Sendai-based 6-car 485 series EMU set A1/2 normally used on Aizu Liner services was repainted from its previous "Akabē" livery into JNR beige and maroon, returning to service from 2 June 2011.

From 25 February 2012, set A1/2 was replaced by 6-car set 485 series set G55/58, a refurbished set, transferred from Oyama Depot and previously used on Nikkō and Kinugawa services.

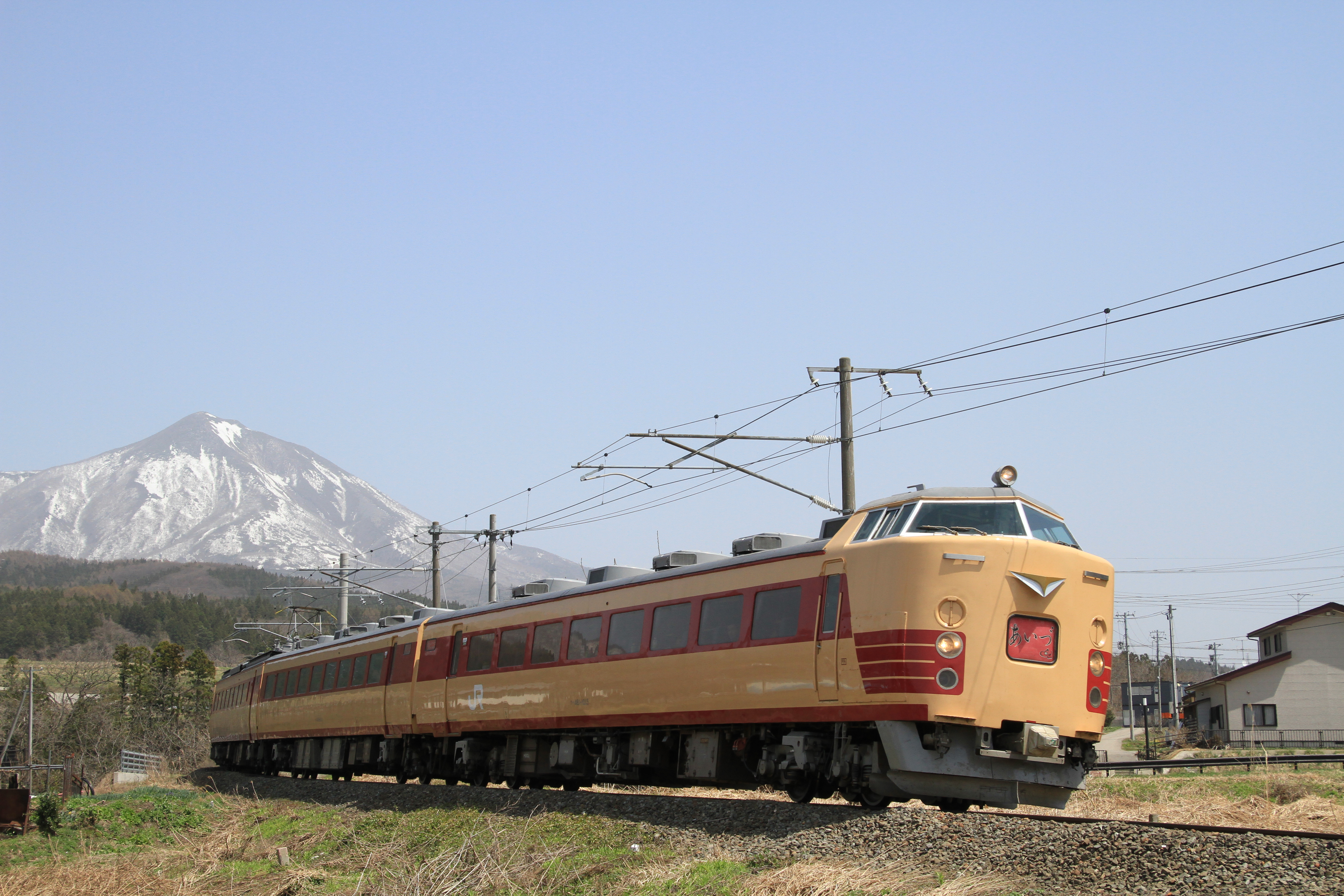
A 485 series EMU on an Aizu rapid service in April 2015

Regular Aizu Liner services were discontinued from the start of the revised timetable introduced on 14 March 2015. Seasonal rapid services, named simply Aizu operate during busy holiday periods, which used six-car 485 series EMU trainsets until the timetable revision in March 2020, at which point the service began to be operated with E721 series EMUs equipped with a reserved seat section.

== See also ==
- List of named passenger trains of Japan
