= Jōko Station =

Railway station in Inawashiro, Fukushima Prefecture, Japan

Jōko Station 上戸駅
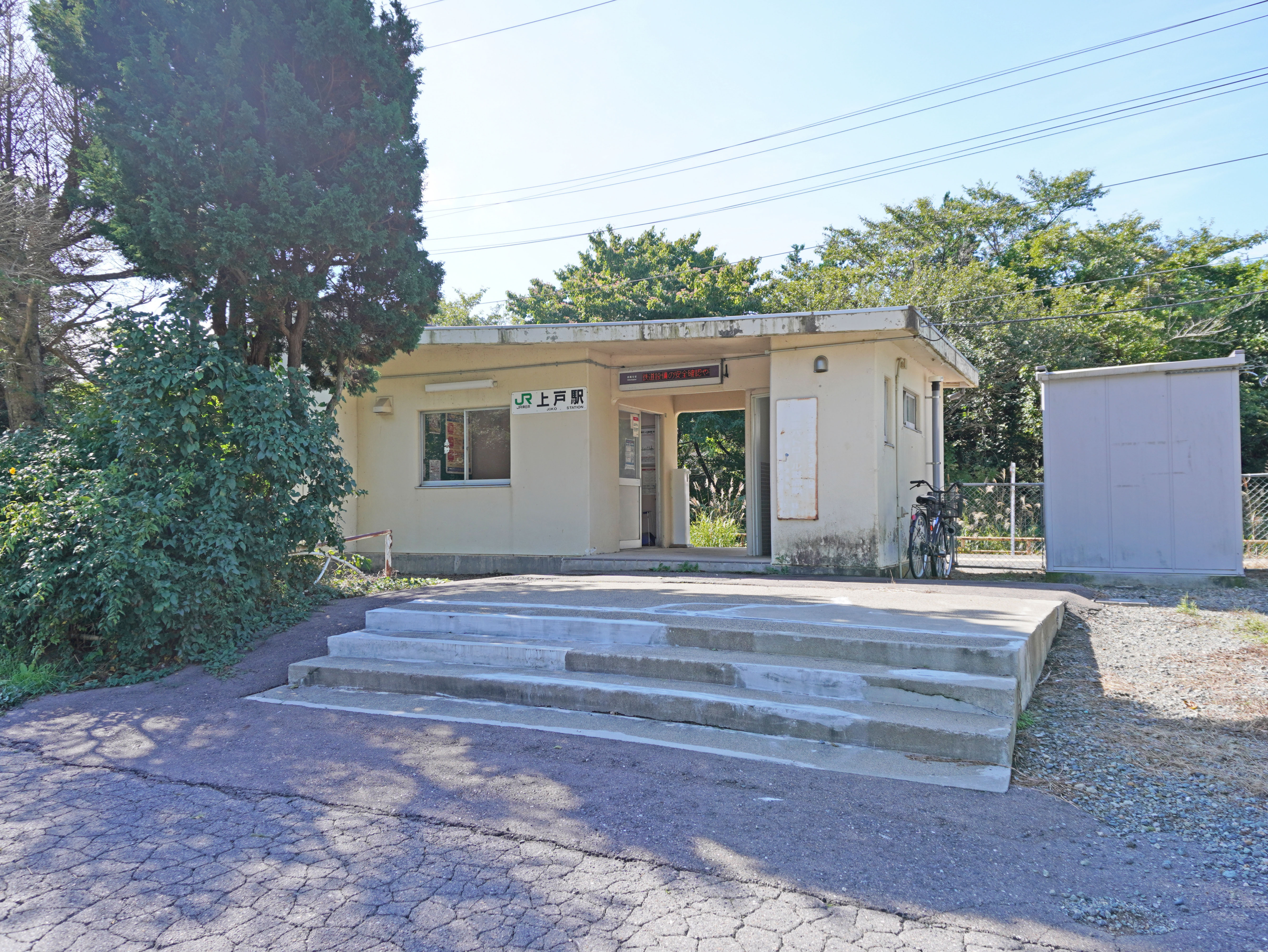
- Jōko Station in September 2022

General information
- Location: 1712 Ohashidori-nishi Yamagata, Inawashiro-machi, Yama-gun, Fukushima-ken 969-2275; Japan
- Coordinates: 37.4876°N 140.1633°E
- Operator: JR East
- Line: ■ Ban'etsu West Line
- Distance: 26.6 km from Kōriyama
- Platforms: 1 side platform
- Tracks: 1

Other information
- Status: Unstaffed
- Website: Official website

History
- Opened: March 10, 1899
- Former names: Yamagata (until 1915)

Passengers
- FY2004: 60 daily

Services
Preceding station	JR East	Following station
Sekito towards Niitsu	Ban'etsu West Line Local	Nakayamajuku towards Kōriyama
Location
- Location within Fukushima Prefecture Location within Japan

Jōko Station (上戸駅, Jōko-eki) is a railway station on the Banetsu West Line in the town of Inawashiro, Fukushima Prefecture, Japan, operated by East Japan Railway Company (JR East).

== Lines ==
Jōko Station is served by the Banetsu West Line, and is located 26.6 kilometers from the official starting point of the line at Kōriyama.

== Station layout ==
Jōko Station has one side platform serving single bi-directional track. The station is unattended.

=== Platforms ===
1	■ Banetsu West Line	for Inawashiro, Aizu-Wakamatsu and Kitakata for Bandai-Atami and Kōriyama
2	■ Banetsu West Line	for Inawashiro, Aizu-Wakamatsu and Kitakata (once per day)

== History ==
The station opened on March 10, 1899 as Yamagata Station (山潟駅). It was renamed on June 1, 1915. The station was absorbed into the JR East network upon the privatization of the Japanese National Railways (JNR) on April 1, 1987.

== Surrounding area ==
- National Route 49

== See also ==
- List of railway stations in Japan
