= Sekito Station =

Railway station in Inawashiro, Fukushima Prefecture, Japan

Sekito Station 関都駅
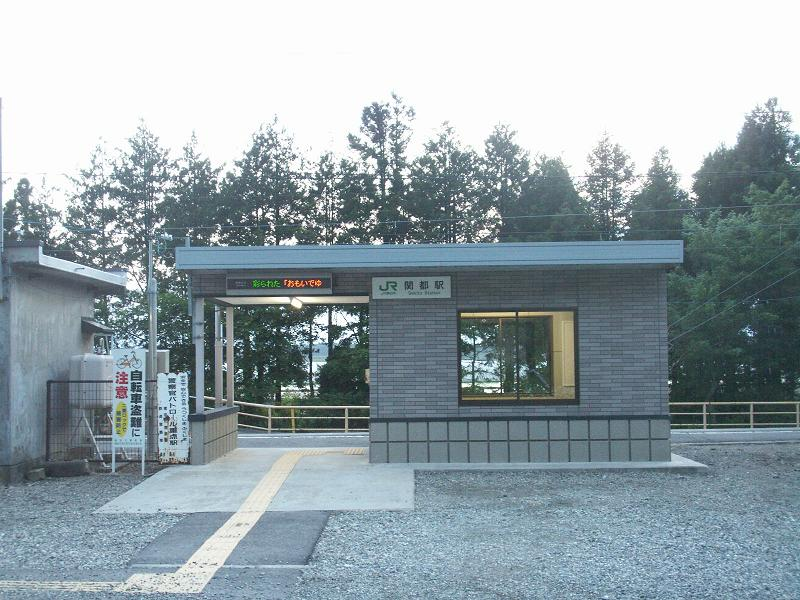
- Sekito Station, June 2008

General information
- Location: 814 Sekito Minamikiritachi 814, Inawashiro-machi, Yama-gun, Fukushima-ken 969-2273; Japan
- Coordinates: 37.5156°N 140.1436°E
- Operator: JR East
- Line: ■ Ban'etsu West Line
- Distance: 31.0 km from Kōriyama
- Platforms: 2 side platform
- Tracks: 2

Other information
- Status: Unstaffed
- Website: Official website

History
- Opened: July 15, 1899

Passengers
- FY 2004: 36 daily

Services
Preceding station	JR East	Following station
Kawageta towards Niitsu	Ban'etsu West Line Local	Jōko towards Kōriyama
Location

Sekito Station (関都駅, Sekito-eki) is a railway station on the Ban'etsu West Line in the town of Inawashiro, Fukushima Prefecture, Japan, operated by East Japan Railway Company (JR East).

== Lines ==
Sekito Station is served by the Ban'etsu West Line, and is located 31.0 rail kilometers from the official starting point of the line at Kōriyama.

== Station layout ==
Sekito Station has two opposed side platforms connected to the station building by a level crossing. However, the Platform 2 is used only for passing trains. The station is unattended.

=== Platforms ===
1	■ Ban'etsu West Line	for Inawashiro, Aizu-Wakamatsu and Kitakata for Bandai-Atami and Kōriyama
2	■ Ban'etsu West Line	for Inawashiro, Aizu-Wakamatsu and Kitakata (once per day)

== History ==
Sekito Station opened on July 15, 1899. The station was absorbed into the JR East network upon the privatization of the Japanese National Railways (JNR) on April 1, 1987.

== Surrounding area ==
- National Route 49

== See also ==
- List of railway stations in Japan
