= Akogashima Station =

Railway station in Kōriyama, Fukushima Prefecture, Japan

Akogashima Station 安子ケ島駅
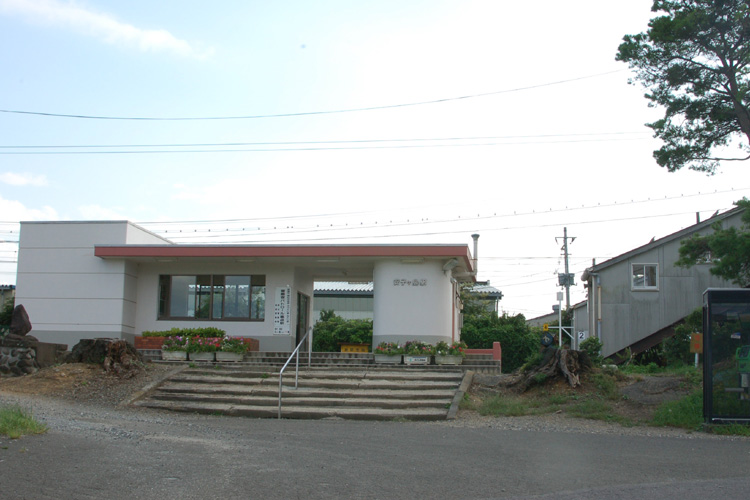
- Akogashima Station, September 2007

General information
- Location: Akogashima, Atamimachi, Kōriyama-shi, Fukushima-ken 963-1304; Japan
- Coordinates: 37.4719°N 140.3100°E
- Operator: JR East
- Line: ■ Ban'etsu West Line
- Distance: 11.8 km from Kōriyama
- Platforms: 2 side platforms

Other information
- Status: Unstaffed
- Website: Official website

History
- Opened: July 26, 1898.

Passengers
- FY 2013: 302 daily

Services
Preceding station	JR East	Following station
Bandai-Atami towards Niitsu	Ban'etsu West Line Local	Kikuta towards Kōriyama
Location
- Location within Japan

Akogashima Station (安子ケ島駅, Akogashima-eki) is a railway station on the Ban'etsu West Line in the city of Kōriyama, Fukushima Prefecture, Japan, operated by East Japan Railway Company (JR East).

== Lines ==
Akogashima Station is served by the Ban'etsu West Line, and is located 11.8 rail kilometers from the official starting point of the line at Kōriyama.

== Station layout ==
Akogashima Station has two opposed side platforms connected to the station building by a footbridge. The station is unattended.

=== Platforms ===
1	■ Ban'etsu West Line	for Inawashiro, Inawashiro, Aizu-Wakamatsu and Kitakata for Kōriyama
2	■ Ban'etsu West Line	for Bandai-Atami, Inawashiro, Aizu-Wakamatsu and Kitakata

== History ==
Akogashima Station opened on July 26, 1898. The station was absorbed into the JR East network upon the privatization of the Japanese National Railways (JNR) on April 1, 1987.

== Surrounding area ==
- National Route 49
- Akogashima Post Office

== See also ==
- List of railway stations in Japan
