= Okinashima Station =

Railway station in Inawashiro, Fukushima Prefecture, Japan

Okinashima Station 翁島駅
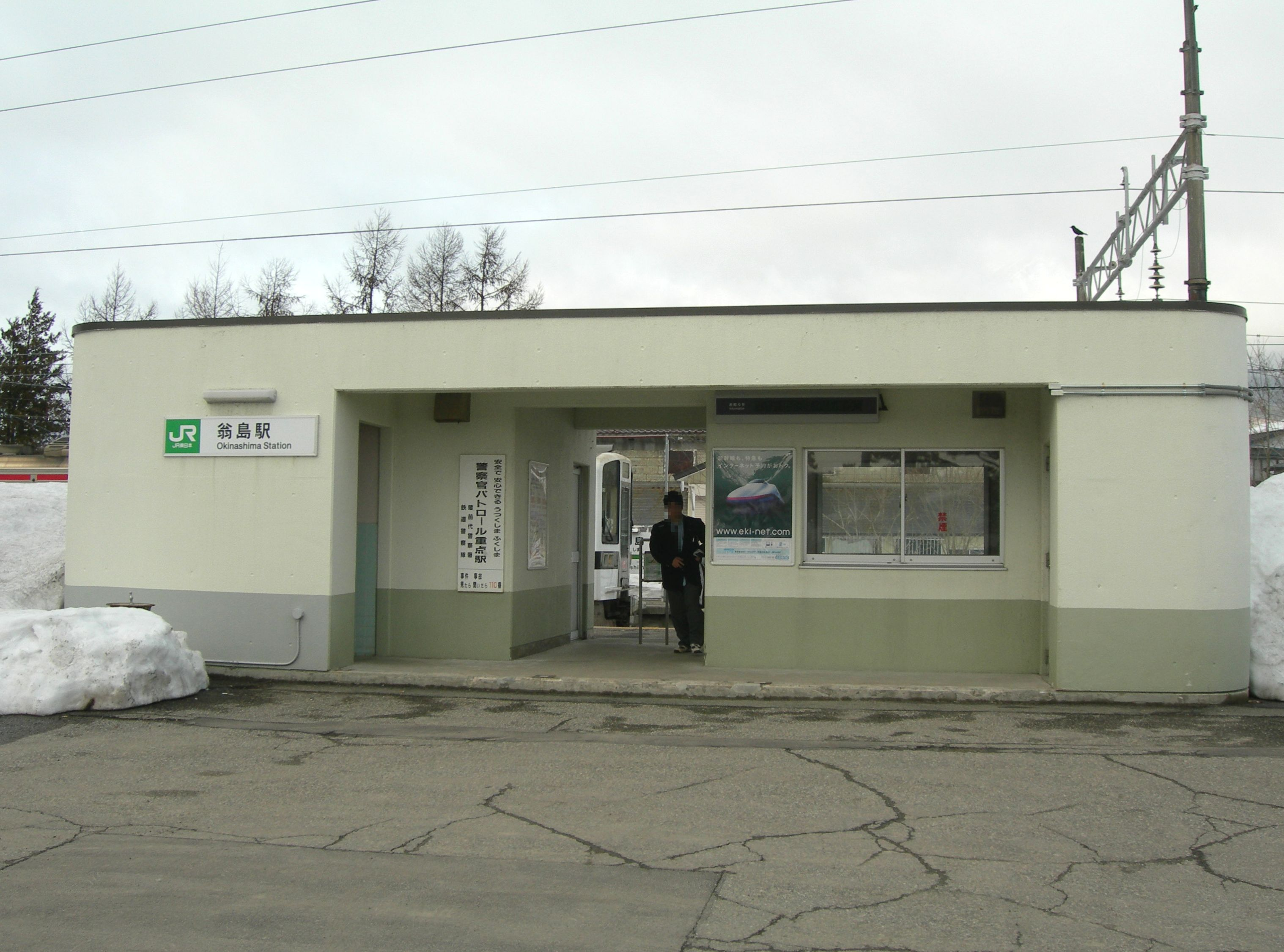
- Okinashima Station, February 2012

General information
- Location: 2477 Iwanenaka, Inawashiro-machi, Yama-gun, Fukushima-ken 969-3286; Japan
- Coordinates: 37.5529°N 140.0542°E
- Operator: JR East
- Line: ■ Ban'etsu West Line
- Distance: 41.1 km from Kōriyama
- Platforms: 2 side platform
- Tracks: 2

Other information
- Status: Unstaffed
- Website: Official website

History
- Opened: July 15, 1899

Passengers
- FY 2013: 27 daily

Services
Preceding station	JR East	Following station
Bandaimachi towards Kitakata	Ban'etsu West Line Rapid	Inawashiro towards Kōriyama
Bandaimachi towards Niitsu	Ban'etsu West Line Local	Inawashiro towards Kōriyama
Location
- Location within Fukushima Prefecture Location within Japan

Okinashima Station (翁島駅, Okinashima-eki) is a railway station on the Ban'etsu West Line in the town of Inawashiro, Fukushima Prefecture, Japan, operated by East Japan Railway Company (JR East).

== Lines ==
Okinashima Station is served by the Ban'etsu West Line, and is located 41.1 rail kilometers from the official starting point of the line at Kōriyama.

== Station layout ==
Okinashima Station has two opposed side platforms connected to the station building by a level crossing. The station is unattended.

=== Platforms ===
1	■ Ban'etsu West Line	for Bandaimachi, Aizu-Wakamatsu and Kitakata
2	■ Ban'etsu West Line	for Inawashiro, Bandai-Atami and Kōriyama

== History ==
Okinashima Station opened on July 15, 1899. The station was absorbed into the JR East network upon the privatization of the Japanese National Railways (JNR) on April 1, 1987.

== Surrounding area ==
- Okinashima onsen
- Tenkyōkaku
- Noguchi Hideo Memorial Hall
- Noguchi Hideo-no-sato Post Office

== See also ==
- List of railway stations in Japan
