= Kikuta Station =

Railway station in Kōriyama, Fukushima Prefecture, Japan

Kikuta Station 喜久田駅
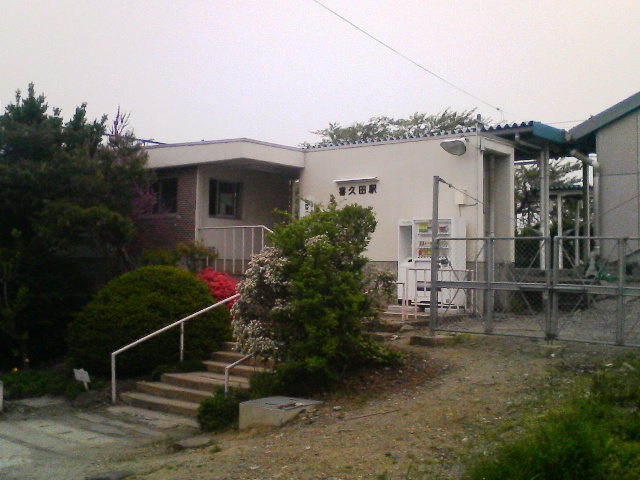
- Kikuta Station, May 2007

General information
- Location: Kikuta-cho Horinouchi, Kōriyama-shi, Fukushima-ken 963-0541; Japan
- Coordinates: 37.4520°N 140.3418°E
- Operator: JR East
- Line: ■ Ban'etsu West Line
- Distance: 7.9 km from Kōriyama
- Platforms: 2 side platforms

Other information
- Status: Ustaffed
- Website: Official website

History
- Opened: July 26, 1898
- Former names: Horinouchi (until 1915)

Services
Preceding station	JR East	Following station
Bandai-Atami towards Kitakata	Ban'etsu West Line Rapid	Kōriyamatomita towards Kōriyama
Akogashima towards Niitsu	Ban'etsu West Line Local	Kōriyamatomita towards Kōriyama
Location
- Location within Japan

Kikuta Station (喜久田駅, Kikuta-eki) is a railway station on the Ban'etsu West Line in the city of Kōriyama, Fukushima, Japan, operated by East Japan Railway Company (JR East).

== Lines ==
Kikuta Station is served by the Ban'etsu West Line, and is located 7.9 rail kilometers from the official starting point of the line at Kōriyama.

== Station layout ==
Kikuta Station has two opposed side platforms connected to the station building by a footbridge. The station is unattended.

=== Platforms ===
1	■ Ban'etsu West Line	for Bandai-Atami, Inawashiro, Aizu-Wakamatsu, and Kitakata for Kōriyama
2	■ Ban'etsu West Line	for Kōriyama

== History ==
The station opened on July 26, 1898, as Horinouchi Station (堀ノ内駅). It was renamed Kikuta Station on April 10, 1915. The station was absorbed into the JR East network upon the privatization of the Japanese National Railways (JNR) on April 1, 1987.

== Surrounding area ==
- National Route 49
- Kikuta Post Office

== See also ==
- List of railway stations in Japan
