= Kawageta Station =

Railway station in Inawashiro, Fukushima Prefecture, Japan

Kawageta Station 川桁駅
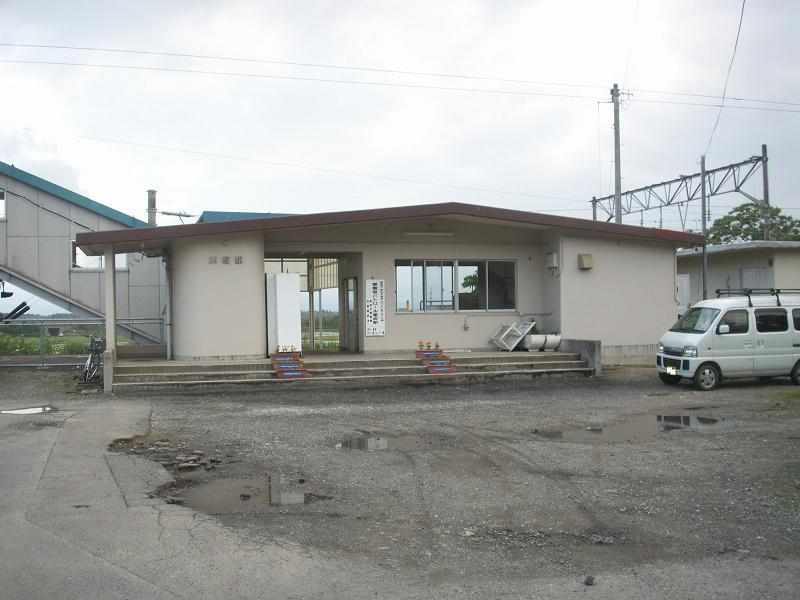
- Kawageta Station, June 2008

General information
- Location: 3605 Shinmachi Kawageta, Inawashiro-machi, Yama-gun, Fukushima-ken 969-2663; Japan
- Coordinates: 37.5355°N 140.1370°E
- Operator: JR East
- Line: ■ Ban'etsu West Line
- Distance: 33.4 km from Kōriyama
- Platforms: 2 side platform
- Tracks: 2

Other information
- Status: Unstaffed
- Website: Official website

History
- Opened: August 4, 1899

Passengers
- FY 2004: 107 daily

Services
Preceding station	JR East	Following station
Inawashiro towards Kitakata	Ban'etsu West Line Rapid	Bandai-Atami towards Kōriyama
Inawashiro towards Niitsu	Ban'etsu West Line Local	Sekito towards Kōriyama
Location

Kawageta Station (川桁駅, Kawageta-eki) is a railway station on the Ban'etsu West Line in the town of Inawashiro, Fukushima Prefecture, Japan, operated by East Japan Railway Company (JR East).

== Lines ==
Kawageta Station is served by the Ban'etsu West Line, and is located 33.4 rail kilometers from the official starting point of the line at Kōriyama.

== Station layout ==
Kawageta Station has two opposed side platforms connected to the station building by a footbridge. The station is unattended.

=== Platforms ===
1	■ Ban'etsu West Line	for Inawashiro, Aizu-Wakamatsu and Kitakata for Bandai-Atami and Kōriyama
2	■ Ban'etsu West Line	for Inawashiro, Aizu-Wakamatsu and Kitakata (2 trains daily)

== History ==
Kawageta Station opened on August 4, 1899 for freight operations and on November 3, 1900 for passenger operations. A private branch line, the Bandai Express Electric Railway extended from this station to Numajiri from 1913 to 1969. The station was absorbed into the JR East network upon the privatization of the Japanese National Railways (JNR) on April 1, 1987.

== Surrounding area ==
- Kawageta Post Office
