= Inawashirokohan Station =

Railway station in Inawashiro, Fukushima Prefecture, Japan

Inawashirokohan Station 猪苗代湖畔駅
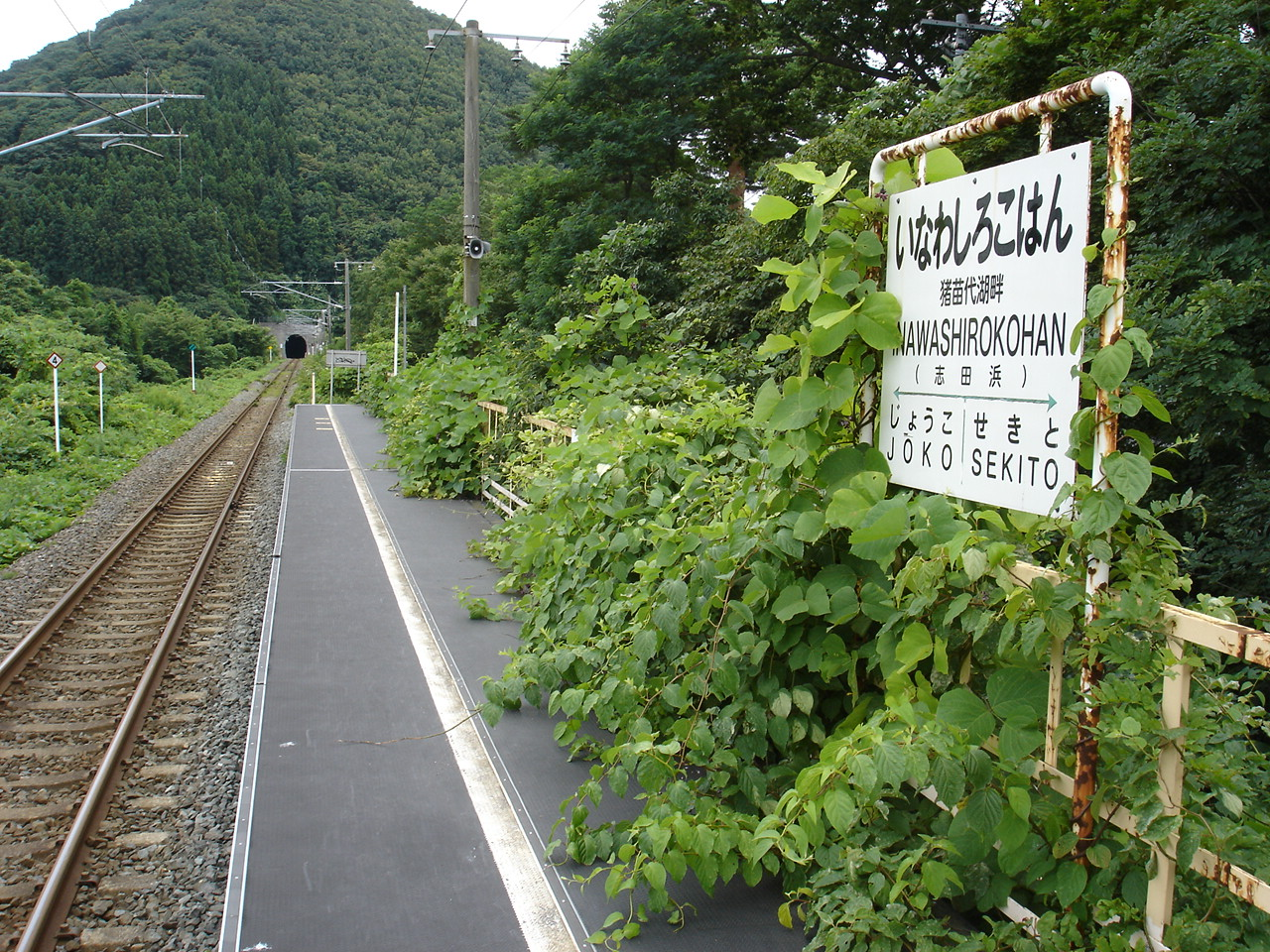
- Inawashirokohan Station in August 2009

General information
- Location: Tsuboyo, Inawashiro-machi, Yama-gun, Fukushima-ken 969-2274; Japan
- Coordinates: 37.5007°N 140.1477°E
- Operator: JR East
- Line: ■ Ban'etsu West Line
- Distance: 29.3 km from Kōriyama
- Platforms: 1 side platform
- Tracks: 1

Other information
- Status: Unstaffed
- Website: Official website

History
- Opened: July 20, 1986
- Closed: 2007
Location
- Location within Fukushima Prefecture Location within Japan

Inawashirokohan Station (猪苗代湖畔駅, Inawashirokohan-eki) was a train station in the town of Inawashiro, Yama District, Fukushima Prefecture, Japan. It has not been in use since 2007.

== Lines ==
Inawashirokohan Station was served by the Banetsu West Line, and was located 29.3 kilometers from the official starting point of the line at Kōriyama.

== Layout ==
Inawashirokohan Station had one side platform serving a single bi-directional track. The station was unattended.
