= Bandaimachi Station =

Railway station in Bandai, Fukushima Prefecture, Japan

Bandaimachi Station 磐梯町駅
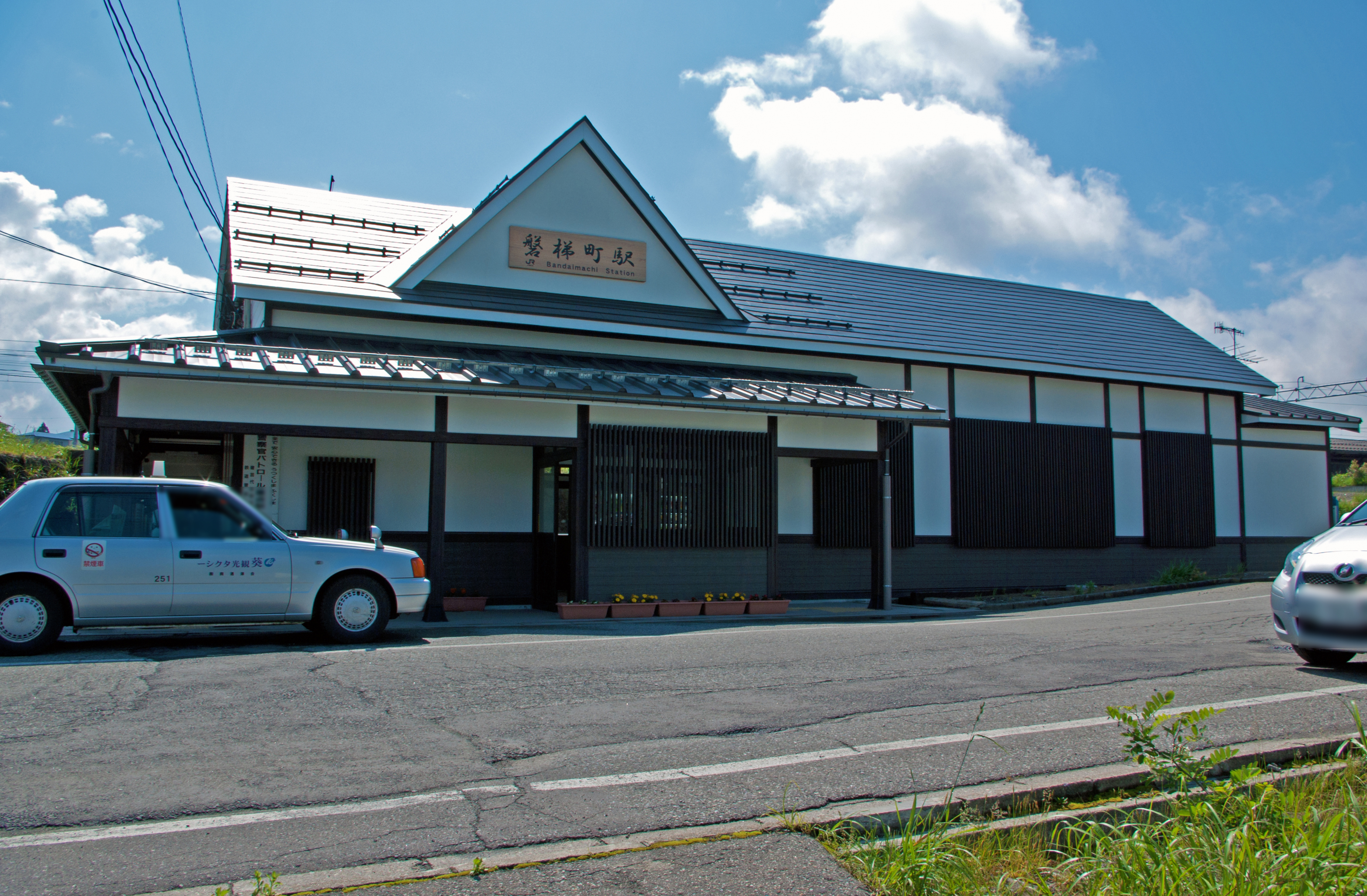
- Bandaimachi Station in February 2012

General information
- Location: 1341-1 Higashi-Matsuyama Bandai, Bandai-machi, Yama-gun, Fukushima-ken 969-3301; Japan
- Coordinates: 37.5573°N 139.9932°E
- Operator: JR East
- Line: ■ Ban'etsu West Line
- Distance: 51.2 km from Kōriyama
- Platforms: 1 island platform
- Tracks: 2

Other information
- Status: Staffed
- Website: Official website

History
- Opened: July 15, 1899
- Former names: Ōdera (until 1965)

Passengers
- FY2017: 156 daily

Services
Preceding station	JR East	Following station
Higashi-Nagahara towards Kitakata	Ban'etsu West Line Rapid	Okinashima towards Kōriyama
Higashi-Nagahara towards Niitsu	Ban'etsu West Line Local	Okinashima towards Kōriyama
Location
- Location within Fukushima Prefecture Location within Japan

Bandaimachi Station (磐梯町駅, Bandaimachi-eki) is a railway station on the Banetsu West Line in the town of Bandai, Fukushima Japan, operated by East Japan Railway Company (JR East).

== Lines ==
Bandaimachi Station is served by the Banetsu West Line, and is located 51.2 kilometers from the official starting point of the line at Kōriyama.

== Station layout ==
Bandaimachi Station has a single island platform connected to the station building by a level crossing. The station is staffed.

=== Platforms ===
1	■ Banetsu West Line	for Aizu-Wakamatsu and Kitakata
2	■ Banetsu West Line	for Inawashiro, Bandai-Atami and Kōriyama

== History ==
The station opened on July 15, 1899, as Ōdera Station (大寺駅). It was renamed Bandaimachi on June 1, 1965. The station was absorbed into the JR East network upon the privatization of the Japanese National Railways (JNR) on April 1, 1987.

== Passenger statistics ==
In fiscal 2017, the station was used by an average of 156 passengers daily (boarding passengers only).

== Surrounding area ==
- Site of Enichi-ji (National Historic Site)
- Bandaimachi Town Hall
- Bandaimachi Post Office

== See also ==
- List of railway stations in Japan
