= Nakayamajuku Station =

Railway station in Kōriyama, Fukushima Prefecture, Japan

Nakayamajuku Station 中山宿駅
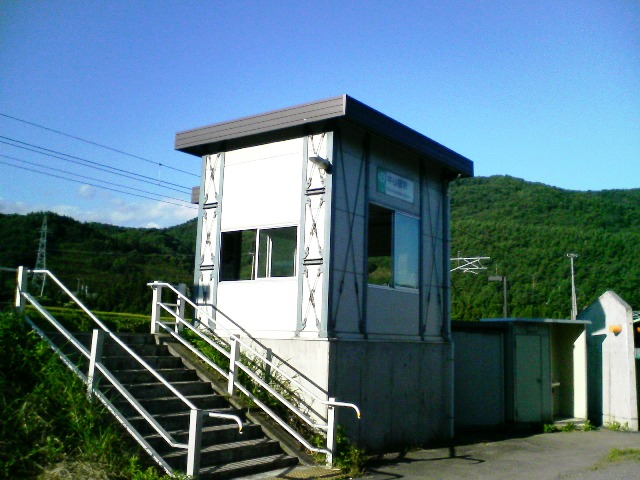
- Nakayamajuku Station, September 2006

General information
- Location: Atami-cho Nakayama Waseda, Kōriyama-shi, Fukushima-ken 963-1308; Japan
- Coordinates: 37.4955°N 140.2195°E
- Operator: JR East
- Line: ■ Ban'etsu West Line
- Distance: 20.8 km from Kōriyama
- Platforms: 2 side platforms

Other information
- Status: Unstaffed
- Website: Official website

History
- Opened: March 10, 1899

Services
Preceding station	JR East	Following station
Jōko towards Niitsu	Ban'etsu West Line Local	Bandai-Atami towards Kōriyama
Location
- Location within Japan

Nakayamajuku Station (中山宿駅, Nakayamajuku-eki) is a railway station on the Ban'etsu West Line in the city of Kōriyama, Fukushima Prefecture, Japan, operated by East Japan Railway Company (JR East).

== Lines ==
Nakayamajuku Station is served by the Ban'etsu West Line, and is located 20.8 rail kilometers from the official starting point of the line at Kōriyama.

== Station layout ==
Nakayamajuku Station has one side platform serving a single bi-directional track. There is no station building, but only a small shelter on the platform. The station is unattended. There was a switchback at this station before 1997. Since then the station platform was relocated and the switchback was demolished due to tunnel construction.

== History ==
Nakayamajuku Station opened on July 26, 1898 as a provisional stop, and was officially made a station on March 10, 1899. The station was absorbed into the JR East network upon the privatization of the Japanese National Railways (JNR) on April 1, 1987.

== Surrounding area ==
- National Route 49

== See also ==
- List of railway stations in Japan
