= Ban'etsu West Line =

Railway line in Japan

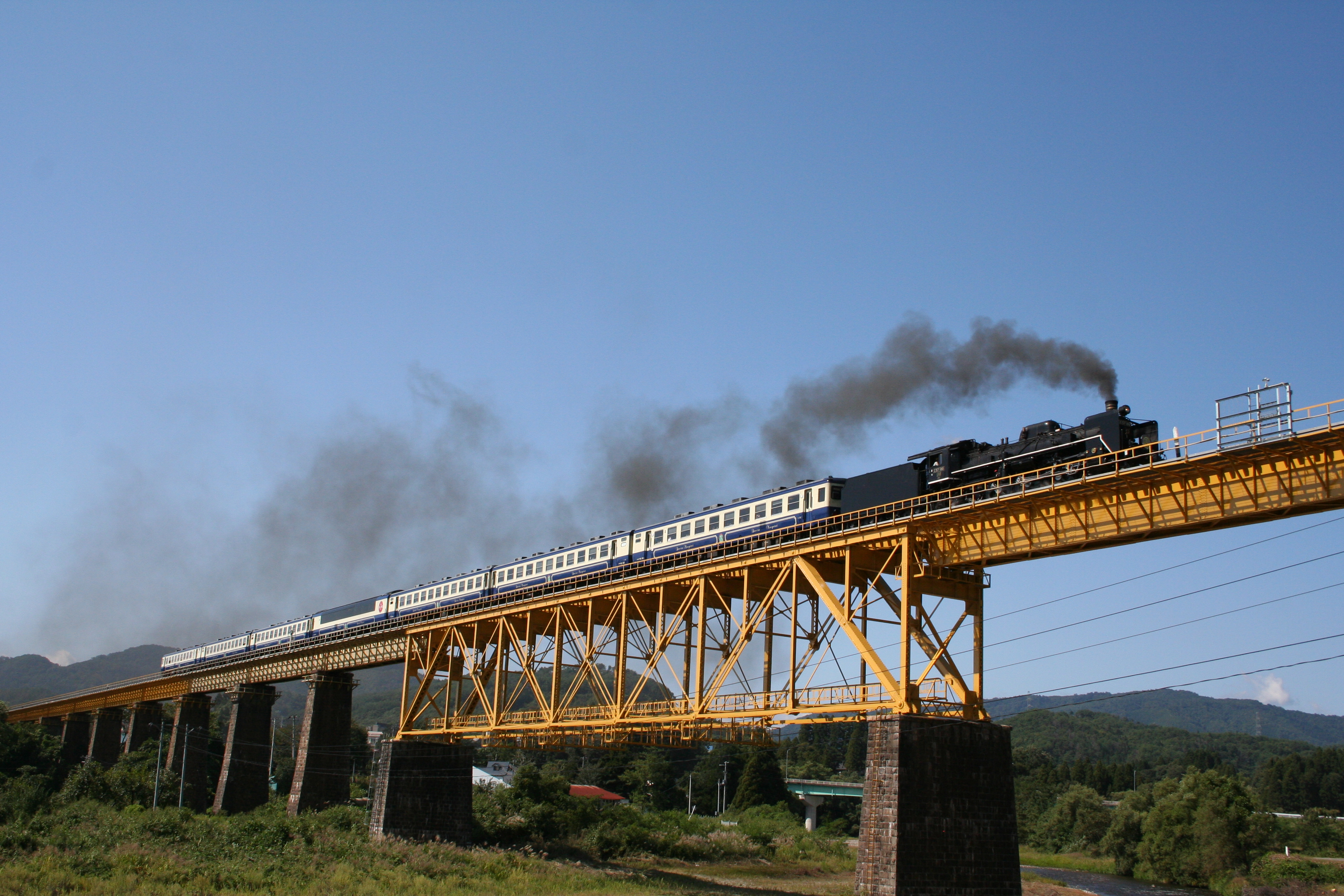
- Joyful Train SL Banetsu Monogatari hauled by C57 crossing the Ichinotogawa River bridge in 2009

Overview
- Native name: 磐越西線
- Status: In operation
- Owner: JR East
- Locale: Fukushima, Niigata Prefectures
- Termini: Kōriyama; Niitsu
- Stations: 43

Service
- Type: Regional rail
- Operator: JR East
- Rolling stock: 719 series EMU, E721 series EMU, KiHa 100 series DMU, GV-E400 series DMU, AT-700 series DMU

History
- Opened: 1898; 128 years ago

Technical
- Line length: 175.6 km (109.1 mi)
- Number of tracks: Entire line single tracked
- Character: Rural
- Track gauge: 1,067 mm (3 ft 6 in)
- Electrification: 20 kV AC, 50 Hz overhead catenary (Kōriyama – Aizu-Wakamatsu ) None (Aizu-Wakamatsu - Niitsu)
- Operating speed: 100 km/h (62 mph)
Route map

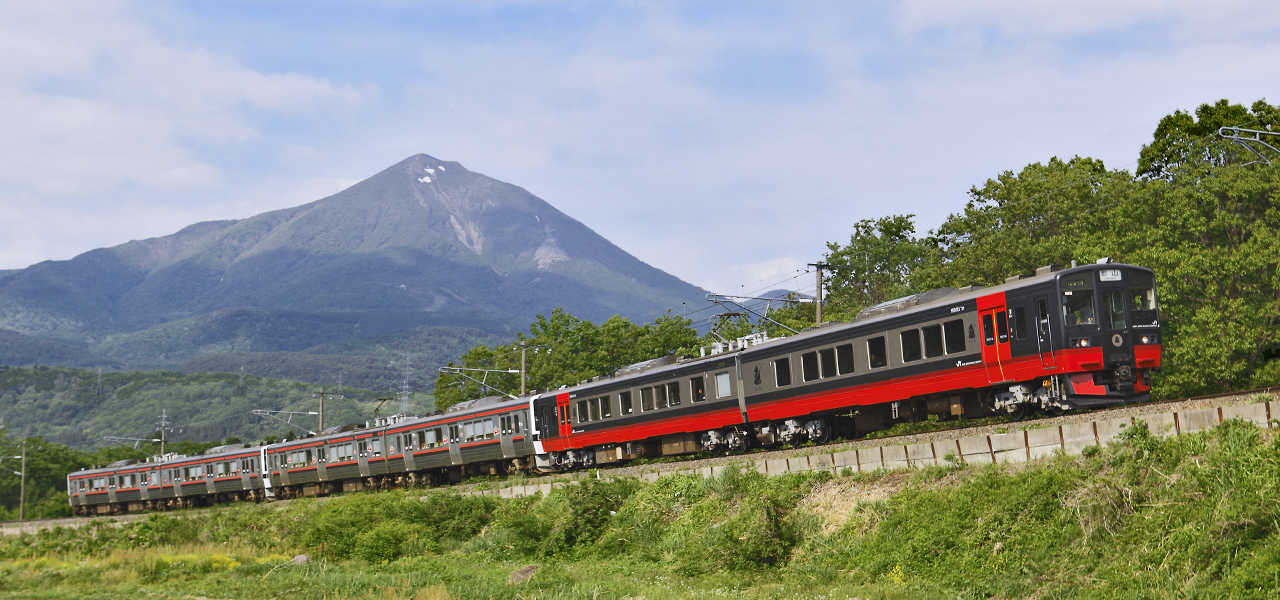
Mount Bandai and Joyful Train FruiTea Fukushima in 2015

The Ban'etsu West Line (磐越西線, Ban'etsu-sai-sen) is a railway line in Japan operated by East Japan Railway Company (JR East). It connects Kōriyama Station in Kōriyama, Fukushima Prefecture and Niitsu Station in Niigata, Niigata Prefecture. The name "Ban'etsu" is taken from the first characters of the names of the ancient provinces of Iwaki (磐城) and Echigo (越後), which the Ban'etsu East and Ban'etsu West lines connect. "Sai" (西) means "west" in Japanese.

The line's nickname is the Mori to Mizu to Roman no Tetsudō (森と水とロマンの鉄道, lit. "railway of forests, water, and romance"), also rendered in English as "Railway of Forests, Water, and Adventure".

== Station list ==
- Local trains generally stop at all stations, but some trains skip stations marked "▽".
- The column marked "*" refers to the unnamed rapid service between Kōriyama and Aizu-Wakamatsu/Kitakata using 719 series EMUs.
- Trains can pass one another at stations marked "◇", "∨", or "∧"; stations marked "◆" are switchback stations. Trains cannot pass at stations marked "｜".

Station	Japanese	Distance (km)		Rapid		Transfers/Other Notes		Location	
Station	Japanese	Between stations	Total	*	Agano	Transfers/Other Notes		Location	
Kōriyama	郡山	-	0.0	●		Tohoku Shinkansen; Yamagata Shinkansen; ■ Tohoku Main Line; ■ Banetsu East Line; ■ Suigun Line (Note: Although the official start of the Suigun Line is Asakanagamori, all trains run through to/from Kōriyama.)	∨	Kōriyama	Fukushima
Kōriyamatomita	郡山富田	3.4	3.4	●			｜	Kōriyama	Fukushima
Kikuta	喜久田	4.5	7.9	▲			◇	Kōriyama	Fukushima
Akogashima	安子ケ島	3.9	11.8	｜			◇	Kōriyama	Fukushima
Bandai-Atami	磐梯熱海	3.6	15.4	●			◇	Kōriyama	Fukushima
Nakayamajuku	中山宿	5.4	20.8	｜			｜	Kōriyama	Fukushima
Jōko	上戸	6.5	27.3	｜			｜	Inawashiro, Yama District	Fukushima
Inawashirokohan (closed)	猪苗代湖畔	2.0	29.3			Closed in 2007	｜	Inawashiro, Yama District	Fukushima
Sekito	関都	1.7	31.0	｜			◇	Inawashiro, Yama District	Fukushima
Kawageta	川桁	2.4	33.4	▲			◇	Inawashiro, Yama District	Fukushima
Inawashiro	猪苗代	3.3	36.7	●			◇	Inawashiro, Yama District	Fukushima
Okinashima	翁島	4.4	41.1	▲			◇	Inawashiro, Yama District	Fukushima
Bandaimachi	磐梯町	10.1	51.2	●			◇	Bandai, Yama District	Fukushima
Higashi-Nagahara	東長原	6.0	57.2	▲			◇	Aizuwakamatsu	Fukushima
Hirota	広田	2.8	60.0	▲			◇	Aizuwakamatsu	Fukushima
Aizu-Wakamatsu	会津若松	4.6	64.6	●	●	■ Tadami Line ■ Aizu Railway Aizu Line (Note: Although the official start of the Aizu Line is Nishi-Wakamatsu, all trains run through to/from Aizu-Wakamatsu.); Terminus of electrification	◆	Aizuwakamatsu	Fukushima
Dōjima▽	堂島	5.5	70.1	｜	｜		｜	Aizuwakamatsu	Fukushima
Oikawa▽	笈川	3.1	73.2	｜	｜		｜	Yugawa, Kawanuma District	Fukushima
Shiokawa	塩川	1.9	75.1	●	●		◇	Kitakata	Fukushima
Ubadō▽	姥堂	2.4	77.5	｜	｜		｜	Kitakata	Fukushima
Aizu-Toyokawa▽	会津豊川	2.0	79.5	｜	｜		｜	Kitakata	Fukushima
Kitakata	喜多方	1.7	81.2	●	●	■ Nitchū Line (closed 1984)	◇	Kitakata	Fukushima
Yamato	山都	9.9	91.1		●		◇	Kitakata	Fukushima
Ogino	荻野	6.1	97.2		●		｜	Kitakata	Fukushima
Onobori	尾登	3.8	101.0		｜		｜	Nishiaizu, Yama District	Fukushima
Nozawa	野沢	5.2	106.2		●		◇	Nishiaizu, Yama District	Fukushima
Kami-Nojiri	上野尻	5.1	111.3		｜		｜	Nishiaizu, Yama District	Fukushima
Tokusawa	徳沢	6.7	118.0		｜		◇	Nishiaizu, Yama District	Fukushima
Toyomi	豊実	3.3	121.3		｜		｜	Aga, Higashikanbara District	Niigata
Hideya	日出谷	7.1	128.4		｜		｜	Aga, Higashikanbara District	Niigata
Kanose	鹿瀬	5.2	133.6		●		｜	Aga, Higashikanbara District	Niigata
Tsugawa	津川	3.4	137.0		●		◇	Aga, Higashikanbara District	Niigata
Mikawa	三川	7.4	144.4		●		｜	Aga, Higashikanbara District	Niigata
Igashima	五十島	4.2	148.6		｜		◇	Aga, Higashikanbara District	Niigata
Higashi-Gejō	東下条	3.9	152.5		｜		｜	Aga, Higashikanbara District	Niigata
Sakihana	咲花	3.1	155.6		●		｜	Gosen	Niigata
Maoroshi	馬下	2.8	158.4		▲		◇	Gosen	Niigata
Saruwada	猿和田	3.5	161.9		｜		｜	Gosen	Niigata
Gosen	五泉	3.8	165.7		●		◇	Gosen	Niigata
Kita-Gosen	北五泉	1.8	167.5		｜		｜	Gosen	Niigata
Shinseki	新関	2.5	170.0		｜		◇	Akiha-ku, Niigata	Niigata
Higashi-Niitsu	東新津	2.8	172.8		｜		｜	Akiha-ku, Niigata	Niigata
Niitsu	新津	2.8	175.6		●	■ Uetsu Main Line; ■ Shinetsu Main Line (Note: Most Banetsu West Line trains travel through to/from Niigata.)	∧	Akiha-ku, Niigata	Niigata

== Rolling stock ==
As of April 2020, the following rolling stock is used on the Ban'etsu West Line.

=== Kōriyama—Aizu-Wakamatsu ===
- E721-0 series EMUs (since 4 March 2017)
- HB-E300 series For Aizu SATANO (since 2024) belonging to the Sendai Vehicle Center.
- AT700/AT750 series For Aizu Mountain Express. Primary runs on weekends, between Aizu Wakamatsu and Kitaca. Going through the Tadami Line then to the Aizu Railway Line to Kinugawa Onsen station

=== Aizu-Wakamatsu—Niitsu ===
- KiHa 110 series DMUs most being replaced by GV-E400 series. These sets belongs to the Niigata Vehicle Center Niitsu Branch.
- GV-E400 series DEMUs Belonging to Niigata Vehicle Center Niitsu Branch(since August 2019)
Operations in Niigata area

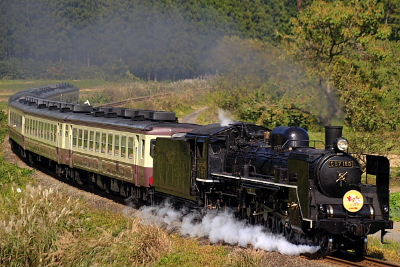
SL "Banetsu Monogatari"

=== Past ===
- 455 series EMUs (from 1967 until March 2008)
- 485 series EMUs (Aizu Liner rapid services)
- KiHa 40/47/48 DMUs (until March 2020)
- 583 series EMUs (Aizu Liner)
- KiHa 52 DMUs (until 2009)
- KiHa 58 DMUs (until 2009)
- KiHa E120 DMUs (until March 2020)
- 719 series EMUs (Until 2023)
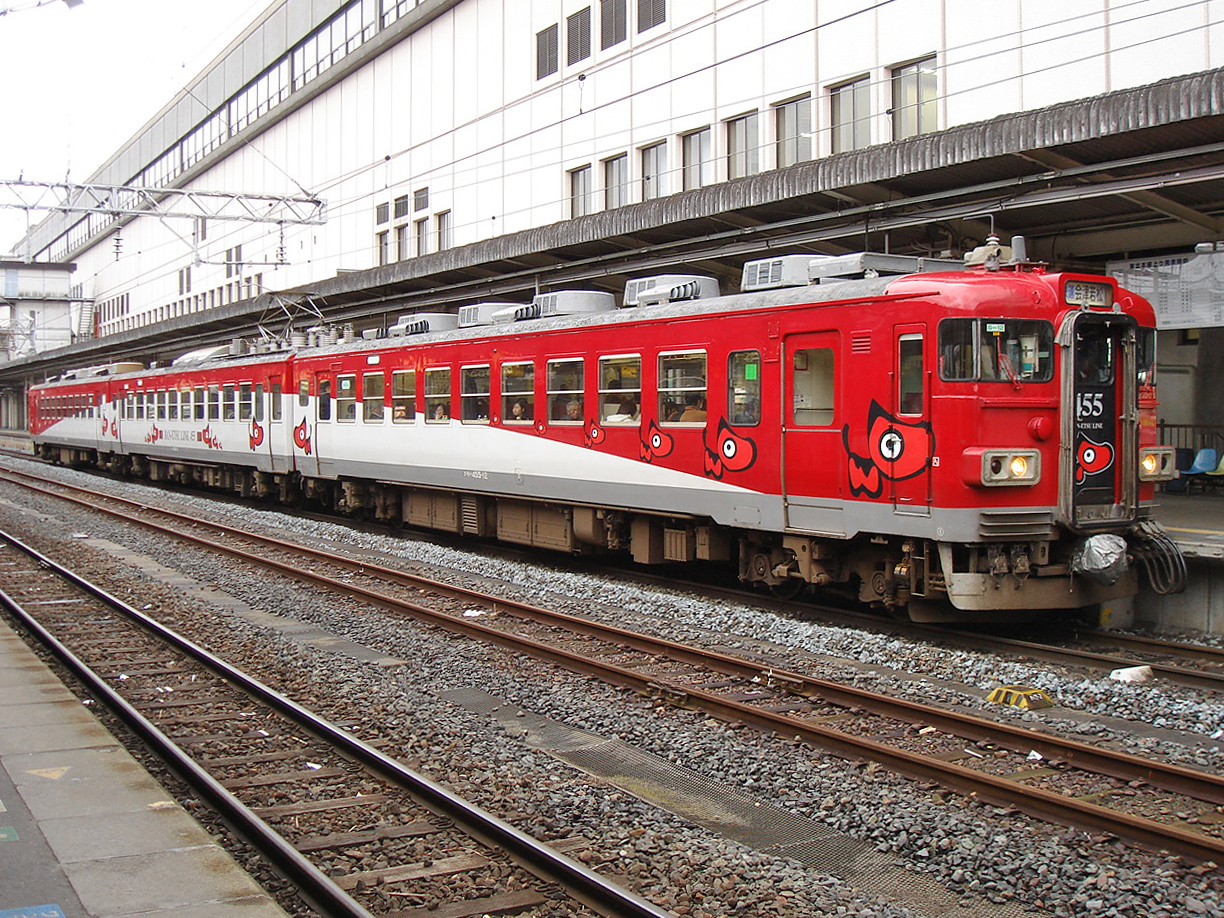
A Banetsu West Line 455 series EMU in December 2006

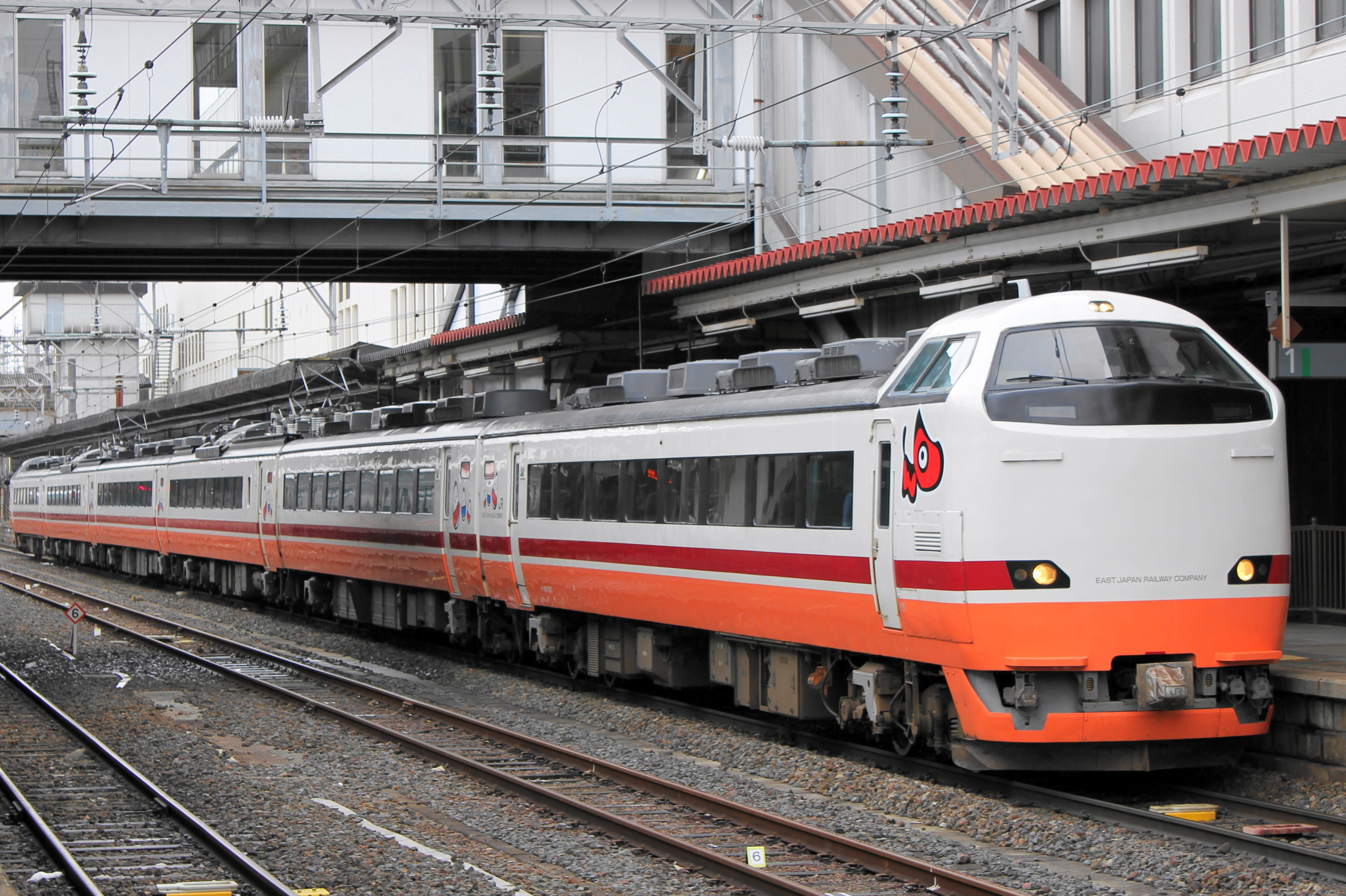
485 series Aizu Liner rapid service at Koriyama Station in March 2012

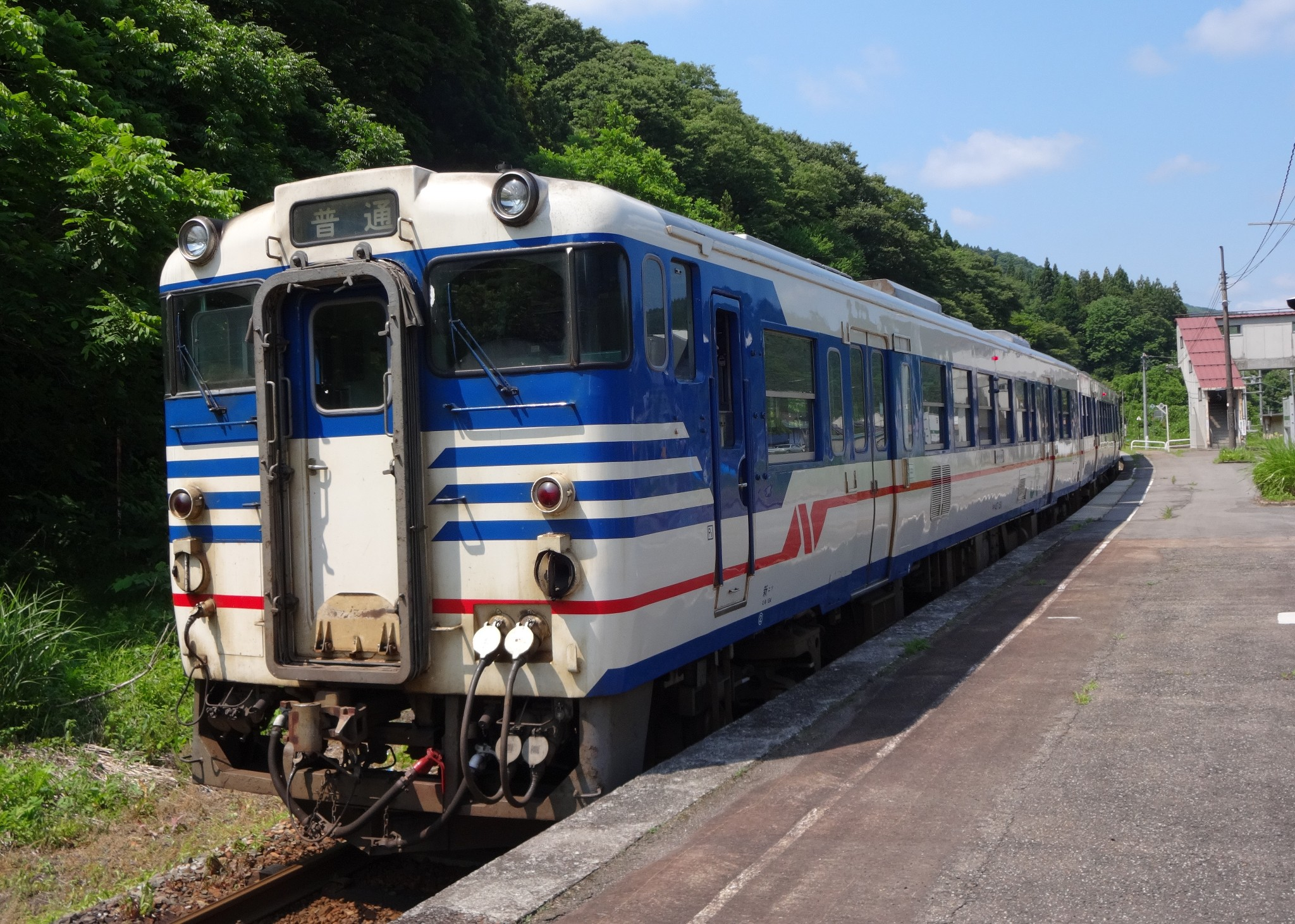
KiHa 40/47/48 series at Tokusawa Station in June 2013

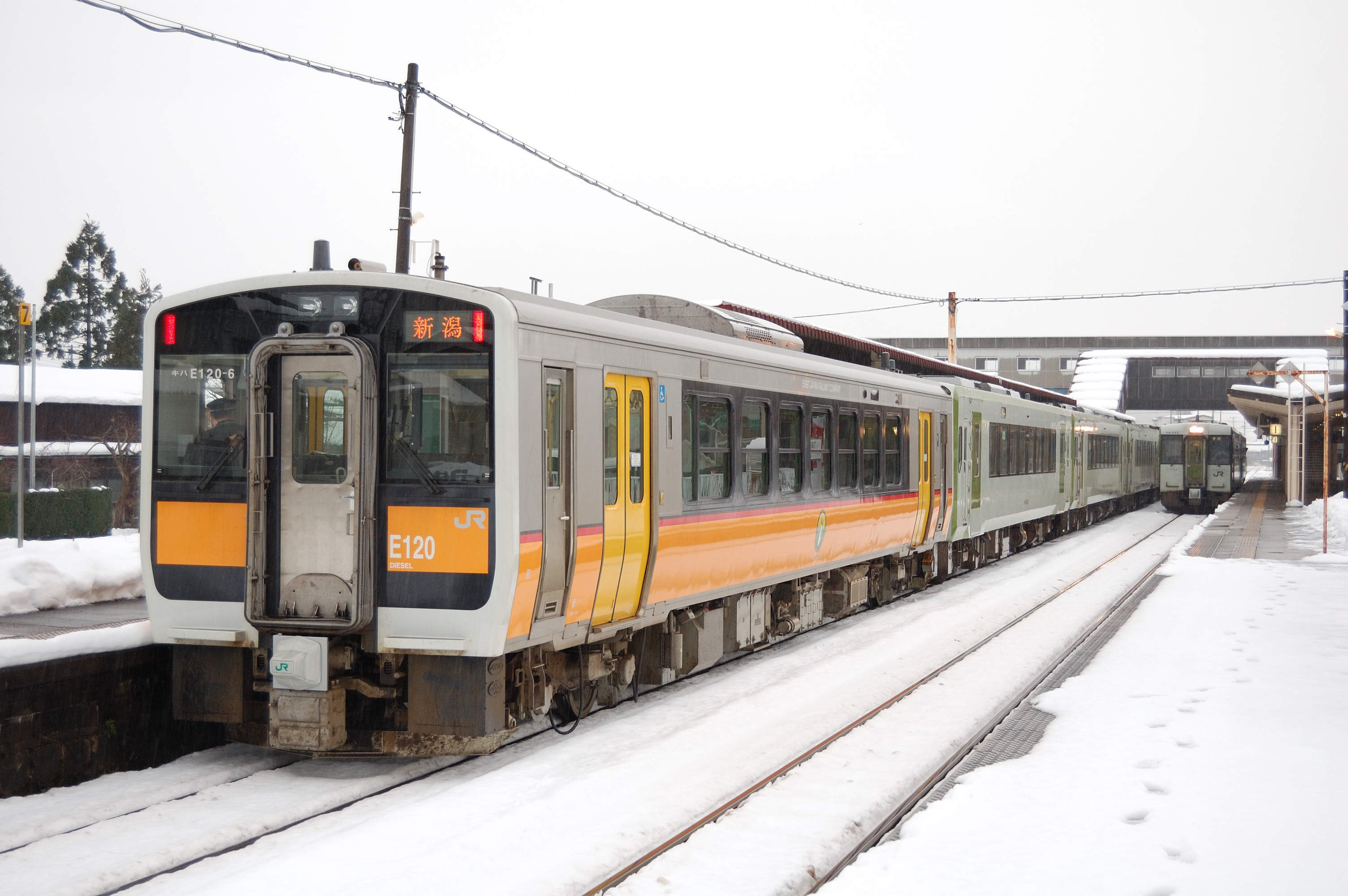
KiHa E120 and 110 at Gosen Station in December 2009

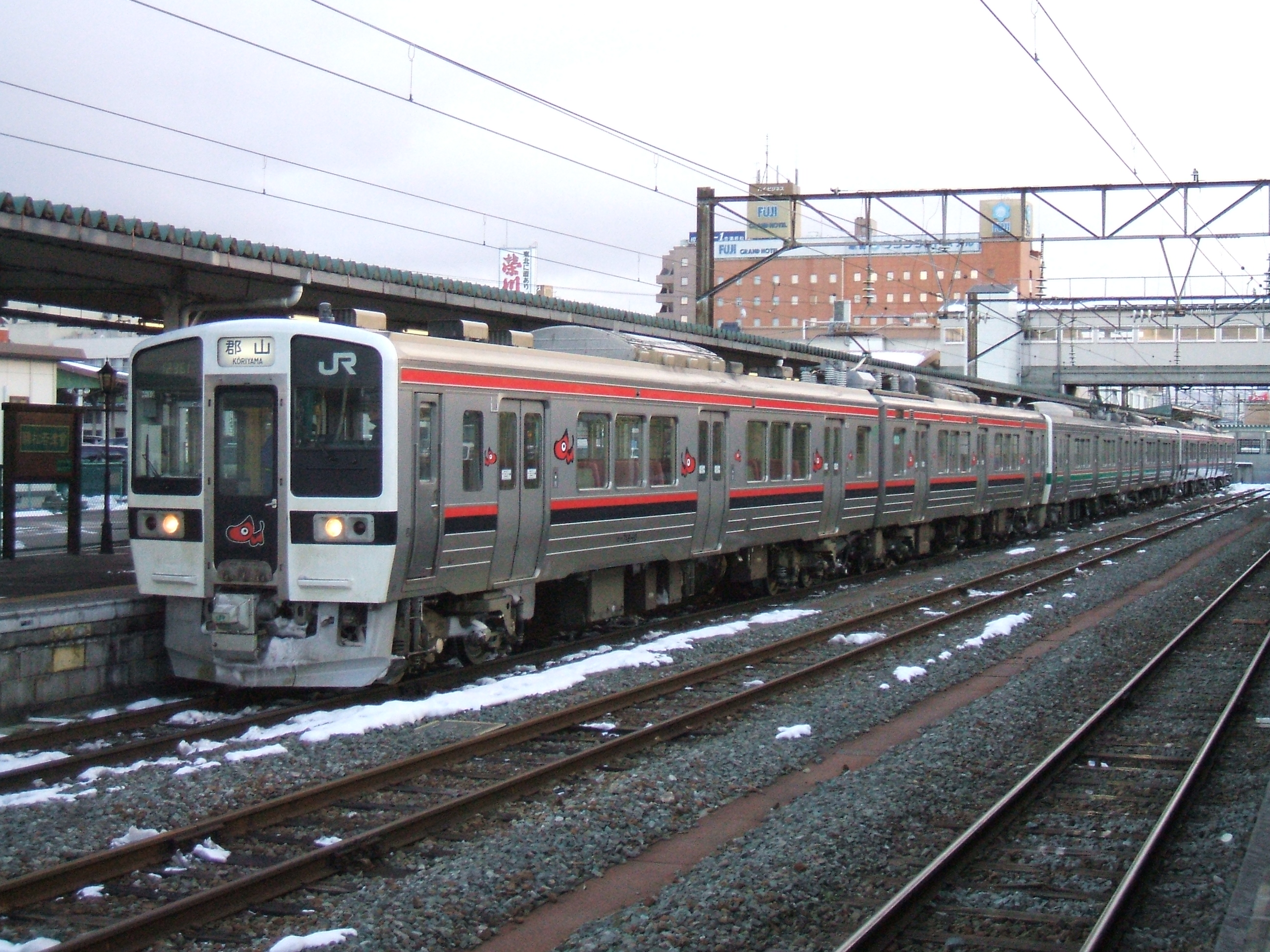
A Banetsu West Line 719 series EMU in January 2008

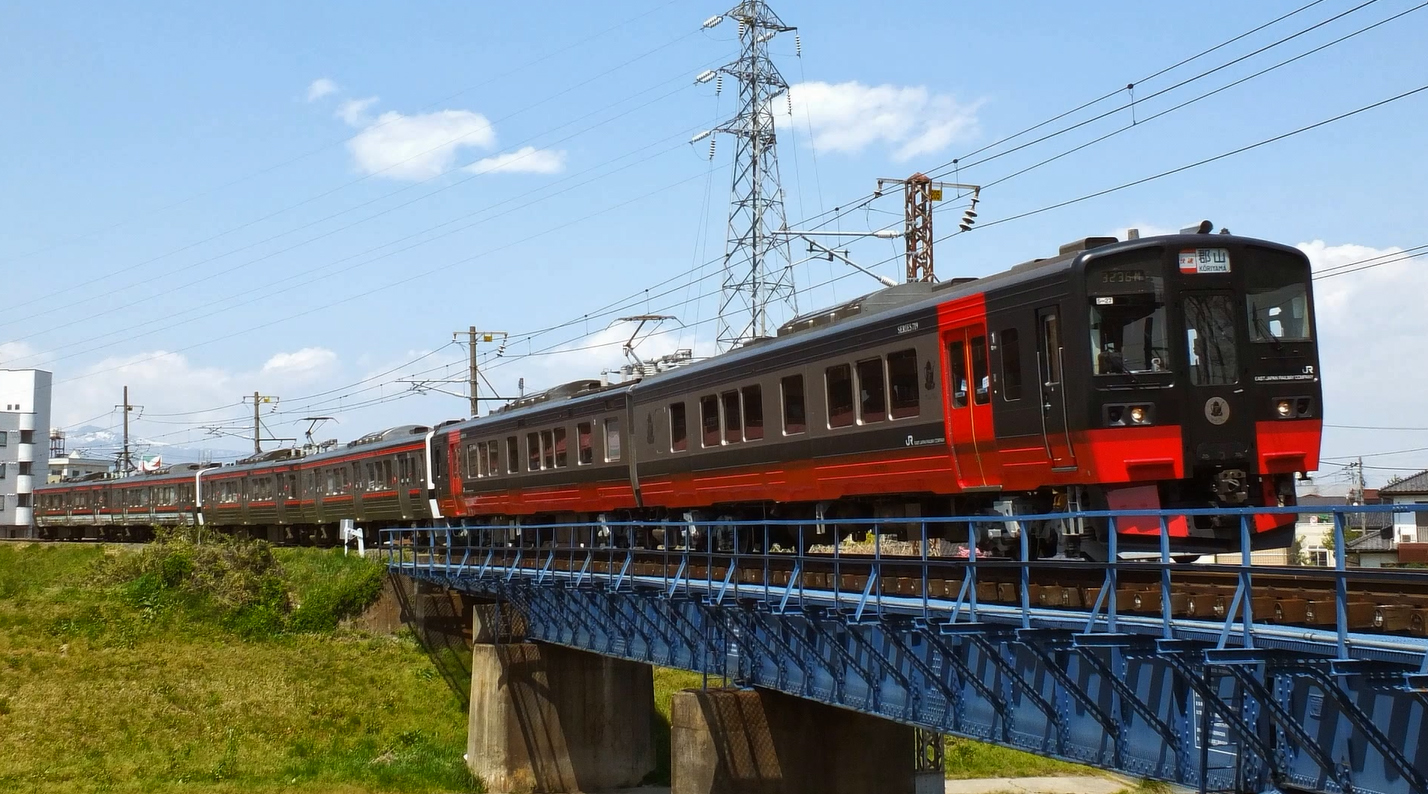
The 719–700 series FruiTea trainset in April 2015

== History ==
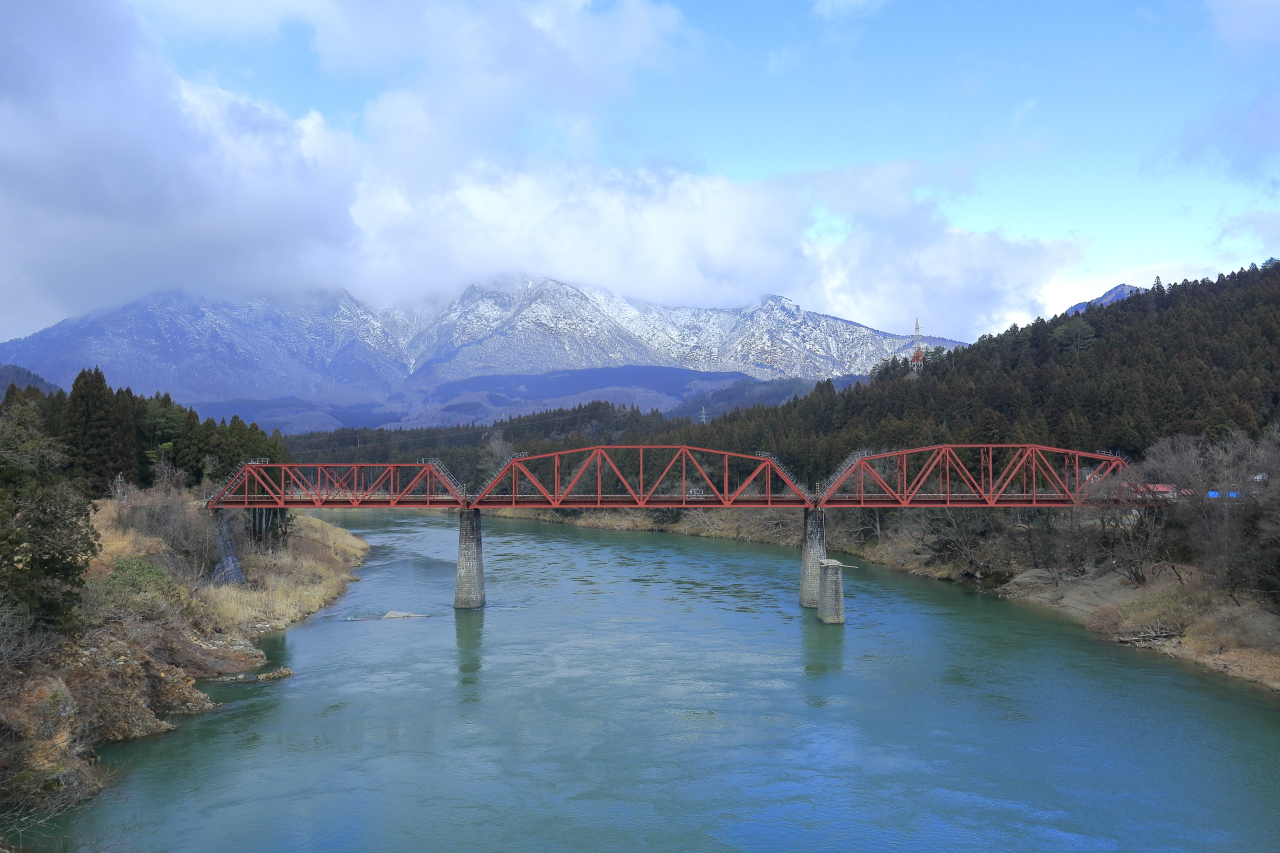
Agano River Taima Bridge

The private Ganetsu Railway opened the initial section from Kōriyama to Nakayamajuku on July 26, 1898, and extended the line to Aizu-Wakamatsu the following year.

Japanese National Railways (JNR) started to modernize the line in the 1960s, introducing the line's first limited express service (as a part of the Yamagata-bound Yamabata) in 1965 between Ueno Station in Tokyo and Aizu-Wakamatsu via the Tōhoku Main Line. In 1968 the train was renamed Aizu Yamabata, but from 1993 onward it was renamed Viva Aizu and ran only between Koriyama and Aizu-Wakamatsu. The train was finally discontinued as a limited express service in 2003.

In 1967, JNR electrified the section between Kōriyama and Kitakata at 20 kV AC.

In 2011 the line was closed for 15 days in March following the Tohoku earthquake, two days in April as a result of aftershocks, and for 10 weeks following torrential rain at the end of July.

A new station, called Kōriyamatomita, opened on 1 April 2017 between and Kōriyama and Kikuta stations.

The railway bridge connecting Kitakata and Yamato collapsed due to heavy rain on 4 August 2022. Services were temporarily suspended between Kitakata and Nozawa. Full service was restored on 1 April 2023. In the timetable revision at December 3, 2022, Rapid Ageo services ceased operations.

Electric services between Aizu-Wakamatsu and Kitakata ceased on 12 March 2022, and the section was deelectrified by May 2024.

== See also ==
- Aizu Liner
- Banetsu Monogatari
