= Inawashiro =

Inawashiro 猪苗代町
- Town
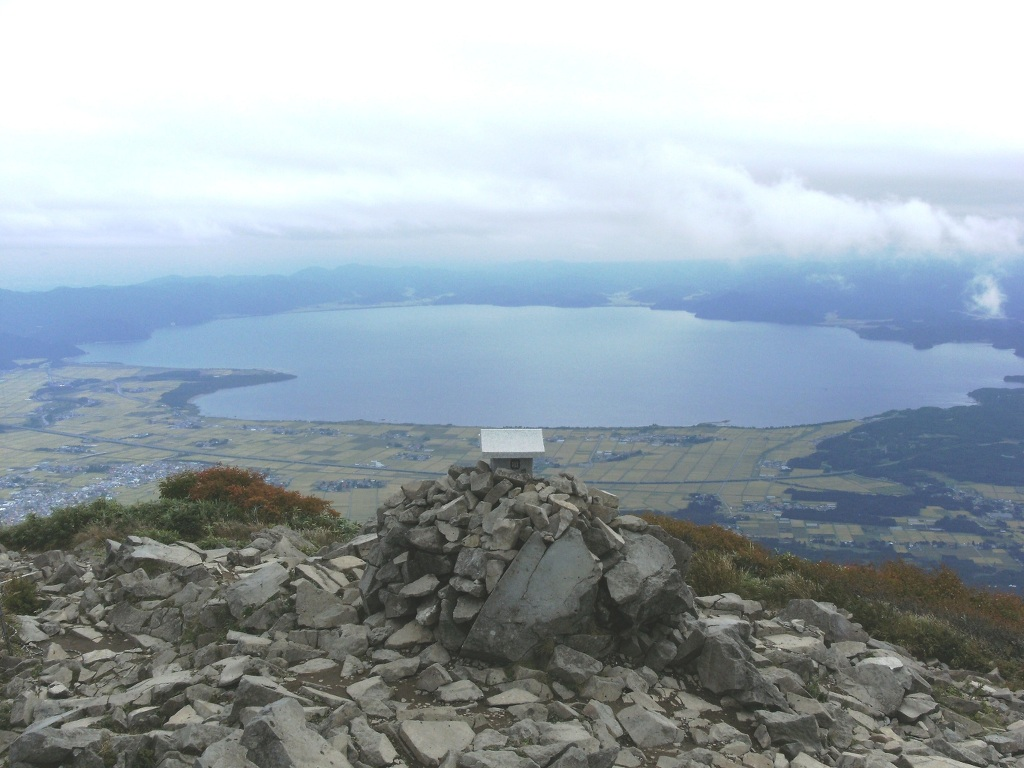
- View of Inawashiro Lake from Mount Bandai

- Flag Seal

- Location of Inawashiro in Fukushima Prefecture

- Coordinates: 37°34′28″N 140°07′17.3″E
- Country: Japan
- Region: Tōhoku
- Prefecture: Fukushima
- District: Yama

Area
  - Total: 394.85 km^{2} (152.45 sq mi)

Population (March 2020)
  - Total: 13,810
  - Density: 34.98/km^{2} (90.59/sq mi)
- Time zone: UTC+9 (Japan Standard Time)
- Phone number: 0242-62-2111
- Address: Jonan 100, Inawashiro-machi, Yama-gun, Fukushima-ken 969-3123
- Climate: Dfa
- Website: Official website
- Symbols
- Bird: Swan
- Flower: Habenaria radiata
- Tree: Sorbus commixta

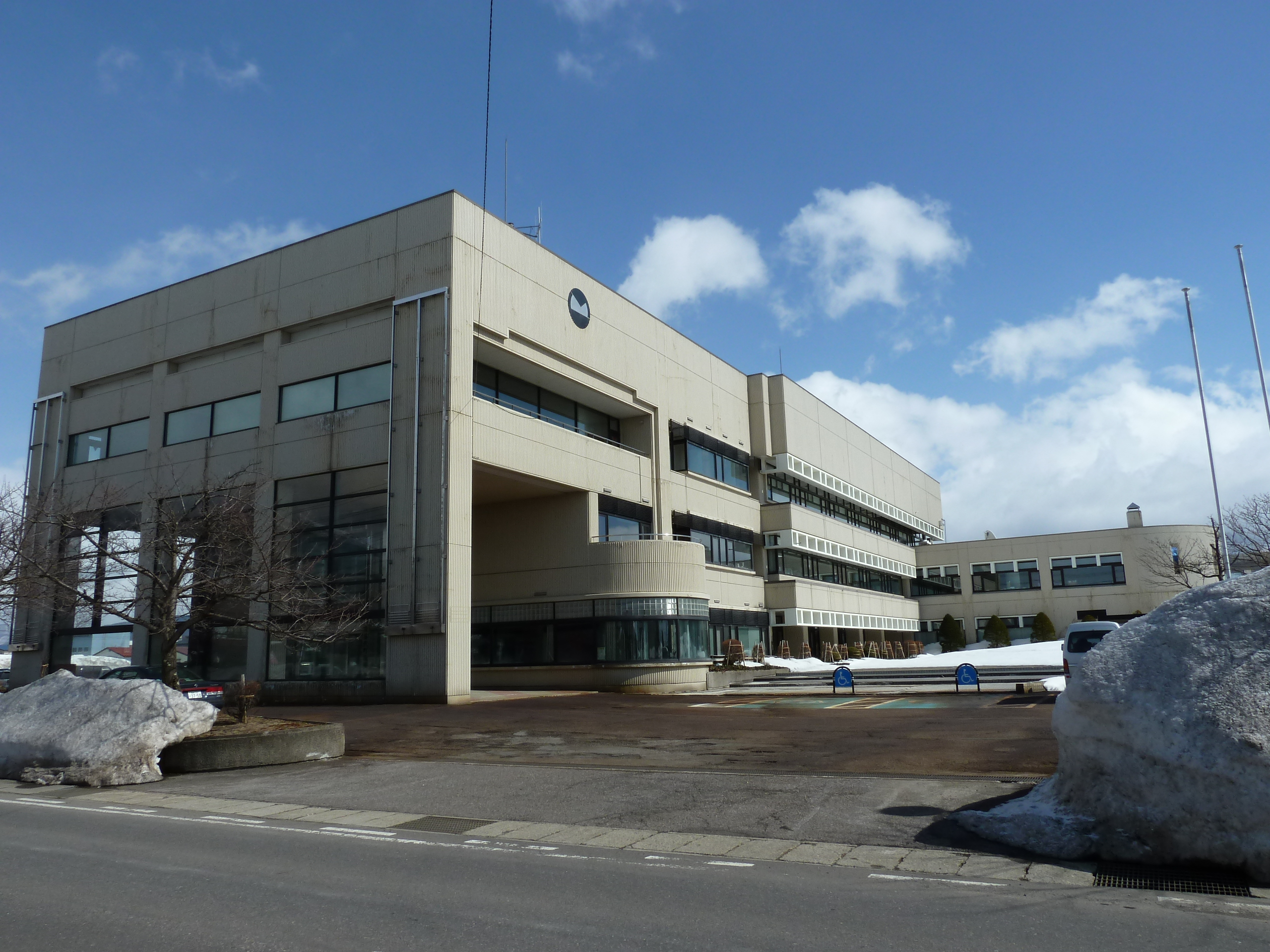
Inawashiro Town Office

Inawashiro (猪苗代町, Inawashiro-machi) is a town located in Fukushima Prefecture, Japan. As of 1 March 2020, the town had an estimated population of 13,810 in 5309 households, and a population density of 35 persons per km^{2}. The total area of the town was 394.85 square kilometres (152.45 sq mi). It is noted as the birthplace of the famous doctor Hideyo Noguchi, who contributed to knowledge in the fight against syphilis and yellow fever.

== Geography ==
Inawashiro is located in the far north of the Aizu region of Fukushima Prefecture, bordering Yamagata Prefecture to the north and Lake Inawashiro to the south.

- Mountains : Mount Bandai, Mount Adatara, Mount Azuma-kofuji
- Rivers : Nagase River
- Lakes : Lake Inawashiro, Akimoto Lake

=== Neighboring municipalities ===
Fukushima Prefecture

- Aizuwakamatsu
- Bandai
- Fukushima
- Kitashiobara
- Kōriyama
- Nihonmatsu

Yamagata Prefecture

- Yonezawa

=== Climate ===
Inawashiro has a humid continental climate (Köppen Dfa) characterized by warm summers and cold winters with heavy snowfall. The average annual temperature in Inawashiro is 10.0 °C. The average annual rainfall is 1367 mm with September as the wettest month. The temperatures are highest on average in August, at around 23.5 °C, and lowest in January, at around -2.4 °C.

Climate data for Inawashiro (1991−2020 normals, extremes 1976−present)
| Month | Jan | Feb | Mar | Apr | May | Jun | Jul | Aug | Sep | Oct | Nov | Dec | Year |
|---|---|---|---|---|---|---|---|---|---|---|---|---|---|
| Record high °C (°F) | 10.8 (51.4) | 13.9 (57.0) | 19.7 (67.5) | 26.8 (80.2) | 30.7 (87.3) | 31.5 (88.7) | 33.9 (93.0) | 34.2 (93.6) | 32.2 (90.0) | 26.9 (80.4) | 22.1 (71.8) | 17.3 (63.1) | 34.2 (93.6) |
| Mean daily maximum °C (°F) | 1.1 (34.0) | 2.0 (35.6) | 6.1 (43.0) | 13.5 (56.3) | 19.5 (67.1) | 22.9 (73.2) | 26.3 (79.3) | 27.7 (81.9) | 23.3 (73.9) | 17.2 (63.0) | 10.9 (51.6) | 4.1 (39.4) | 14.6 (58.2) |
| Daily mean °C (°F) | −2.1 (28.2) | −1.7 (28.9) | 1.6 (34.9) | 7.9 (46.2) | 13.9 (57.0) | 18.1 (64.6) | 21.7 (71.1) | 22.7 (72.9) | 18.6 (65.5) | 12.4 (54.3) | 6.2 (43.2) | 0.7 (33.3) | 10.0 (50.0) |
| Mean daily minimum °C (°F) | −5.5 (22.1) | −5.8 (21.6) | −2.7 (27.1) | 2.6 (36.7) | 8.4 (47.1) | 13.9 (57.0) | 18.0 (64.4) | 18.7 (65.7) | 14.6 (58.3) | 8.1 (46.6) | 2.1 (35.8) | −2.5 (27.5) | 5.8 (42.5) |
| Record low °C (°F) | −16.8 (1.8) | −17.5 (0.5) | −14.7 (5.5) | −7.8 (18.0) | −1.1 (30.0) | 4.6 (40.3) | 8.0 (46.4) | 10.0 (50.0) | 3.3 (37.9) | −1.9 (28.6) | −9.6 (14.7) | −16.4 (2.5) | −17.5 (0.5) |
| Average precipitation mm (inches) | 72.0 (2.83) | 53.5 (2.11) | 69.3 (2.73) | 74.9 (2.95) | 86.5 (3.41) | 123.4 (4.86) | 206.6 (8.13) | 142.9 (5.63) | 132.2 (5.20) | 119.6 (4.71) | 89.3 (3.52) | 92.7 (3.65) | 1,263 (49.72) |
| Average snowfall cm (inches) | 203 (80) | 172 (68) | 101 (40) | 11 (4.3) | 0 (0) | 0 (0) | 0 (0) | 0 (0) | 0 (0) | 0 (0) | 14 (5.5) | 129 (51) | 627 (247) |
| Average rainy days (≥ 1.0 mm) | 15.6 | 13.1 | 13.7 | 11.0 | 10.9 | 11.4 | 13.9 | 11.2 | 11.9 | 11.8 | 13.1 | 16.1 | 153.7 |
| Average snowy days (≥ 3 cm) | 20.8 | 19.8 | 12.7 | 1.5 | 0 | 0 | 0 | 0 | 0 | 0 | 1.6 | 11.9 | 68.3 |
| Mean monthly sunshine hours | 84.5 | 96.5 | 137.7 | 169.9 | 198.2 | 156.5 | 144.9 | 182.6 | 135.5 | 132.8 | 113.4 | 82.3 | 1,627.6 |
Source 1: JMA
Source 2: JMA

== Demographics ==
Per Japanese census data, the population of Inawashiro has declined steadily over the past 40 years.

Historical population
| Year | Pop. | ±% |
|---|---|---|
| 1920 | 19,112 | — |
| 1930 | 20,822 | +8.9% |
| 1940 | 23,351 | +12.1% |
| 1950 | 27,538 | +17.9% |
| 1960 | 26,058 | −5.4% |
| 1970 | 21,417 | −17.8% |
| 1980 | 19,717 | −7.9% |
| 1990 | 18,839 | −4.5% |
| 2000 | 18,178 | −3.5% |
| 2010 | 15,797 | −13.1% |
| 2020 | 13,552 | −14.2% |

== History ==
The area of present-day Inawashiro was part of ancient Mutsu Province and the location of Inawashiro Castle since the Kamakura period. It was the site of the Battle of Suriagehara during the Sengoku period. The area formed part of the holdings of Aizu Domain during the Edo period. During the Boshin War, the Battle of Bonari Pass took place near Inawashiro. After the Meiji Restoration, the area was organized as part of Yama District, Fukushima Prefecture. The town of Inawashiro was founded with the establishment of the modern municipalities system on April 1, 1898. The town borders expanded considerably in 1955 through a merger with the villages of Iwase, Iwaho, Azauma, Nagase, Tsukinowa, Chisato, and Okinajima.

== Economy ==
The economy of Inawashiro is based on tourism and agriculture. Primary agricultural crops include buckwheat and rice, along with tomatoes, dairy farming and miso. There are many ski resorts, onsen and leisure facilities at Lake Inawashiro. Sulfur mining, formerly a mainstay of the local economy, ended with the closure of the last mine in 1968.

== Education ==
Inawashiro has six public elementary schools and three public junior high schools operated by the town government. The town has one public high school operated by the Fukushima Prefectural Board of Education. The prefecture also operates one special education school.

== Transportation ==
=== Railway ===
JR East – Ban'etsu West Line

- Jōko - Sekito - Kawageta - Inawashiro - Okinashima

=== Highway ===
- Ban-etsu Expressway – Inawashiro-Bandai Kogen IC
- National Route 49
- National Route 115

== Local attractions ==
- Tenkyōkaku, a Meiji-period former residence of Prince Arisugawa Takehito, designated an Important Cultural Property (ICP)
- Noguchi Hideyo Memorial Hall
- Lake Inawashiro
- former Okinashima Villa of Prince Takamatsu (ICP)
- former Baba residence (ICP)
- Aizu-Matsudiara clan cemetery, National historic site

== Noted people from Inawashiro ==
- Hideyo Noguchi, bacteriologist
- Takeshi Suzuki, alpine skier
- Yumeko Aizome, actress

== See also ==
- Lake Inawashiro
- Mount Bandai
