= Kōriyamatomita Station =

Railway station in Kōriyama, Fukushima Prefecture, Japan

Kōriyamatomita Station 郡山富田駅
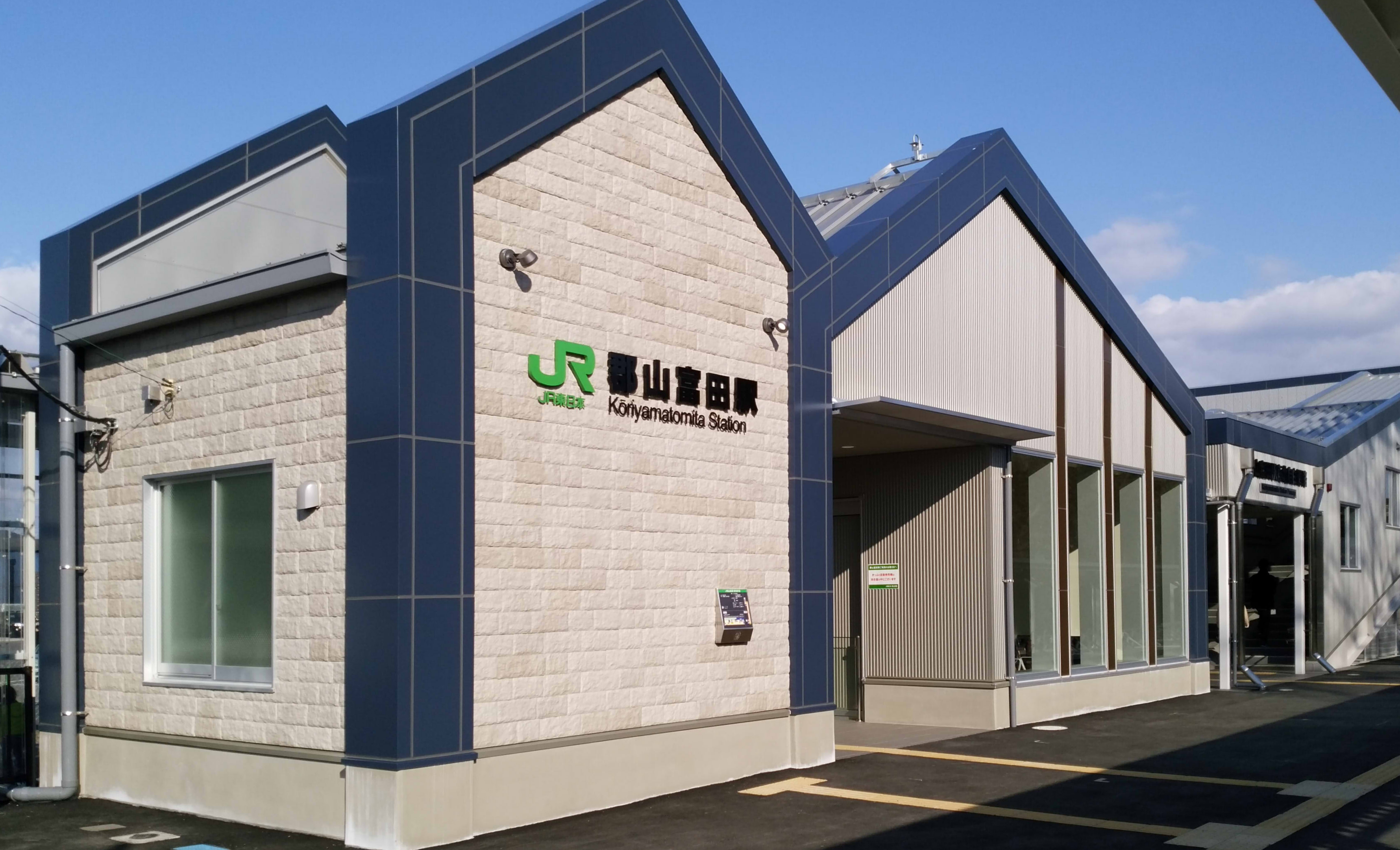
- The station entrance in April 2017

General information
- Location: Mansuida, Tomita-machi, Kōriyama-shi, Fukushima-ken 963-8041; Japan
- Coordinates: 37°25′13.3″N 140°22′10.2″E
- Operator: JR East
- Line: ■ Banetsu West Line
- Distance: 3.4 km from Kōriyama
- Platforms: 1 side platform
- Tracks: 1

Construction
- Cycle facilities: Yes

Other information
- Status: Unstaffed
- Website: Official website

History
- Opened: 1 April 2017

Passengers
- Approx. 1,000 per day (forecast)

Services
Preceding station	JR East	Following station
Kikuta towards Kitakata	Ban'etsu West Line Rapid	Kōriyama Terminus
Kikuta towards Niitsu	Ban'etsu West Line Local	Kōriyama Terminus
Location
- Location within Japan

Kōriyamatomita Station (郡山富田駅, Kōriyama-tomita-eki) is a railway station on the Banetsu West Line in the city of Kōriyama, Fukushima, Japan, operated by East Japan Railway Company (JR East). It opened on 1 April 2017.

== Lines ==
Kōriyamatomita Station is served by the Banetsu West Line, and is located 3.4 km from the official starting point of the line at Kōriyama. As of 1 April 2017, the station is served by 18 ascending and 19 descending services daily.

== Station layout ==
The station is unstaffed, and has a single side platform serving a single bidirectional track. The platform is long enough to accommodate six-car trains, and has a roof extending a length of three cars.

== History ==
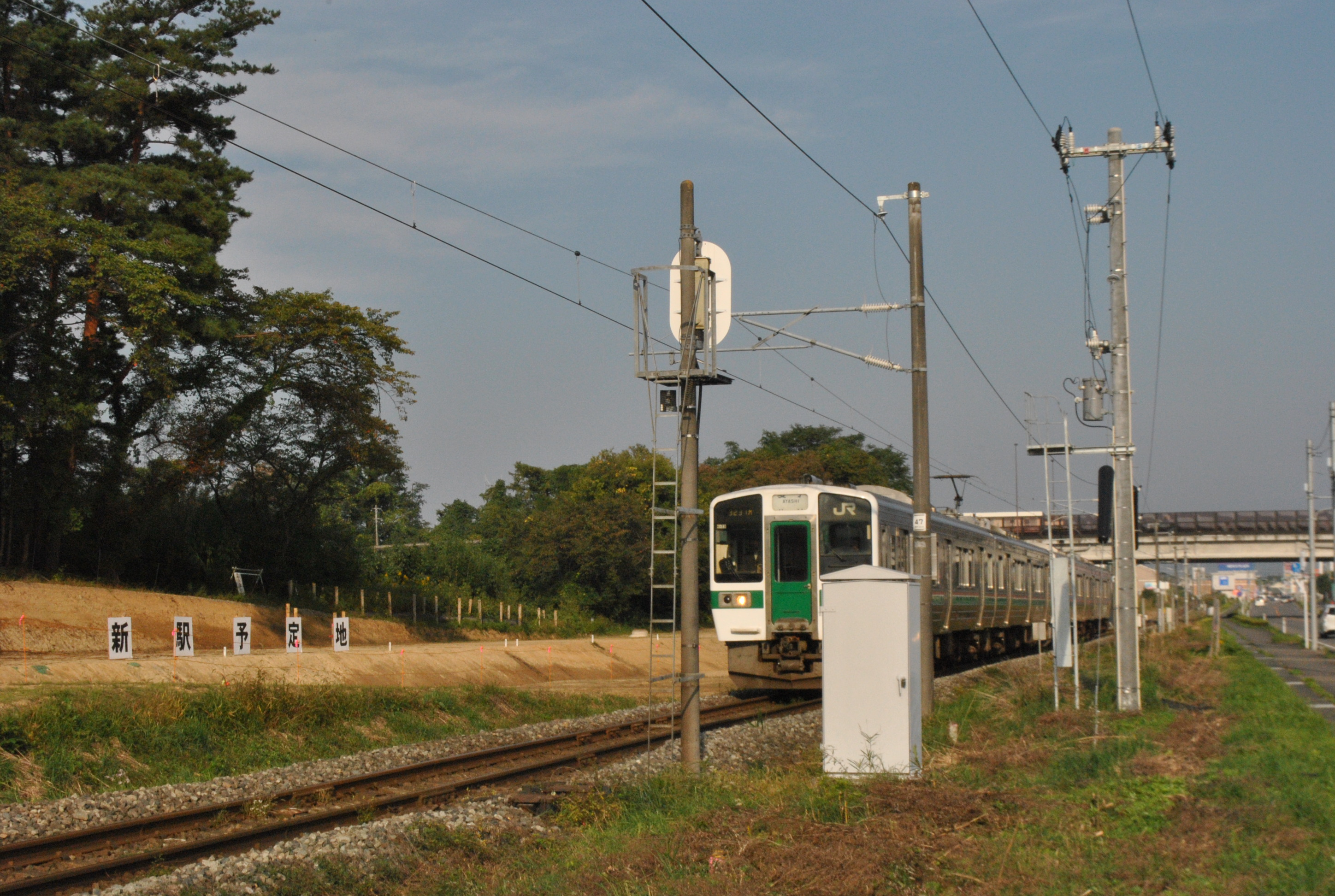
The site of the station in October 2015 before the start of construction

Details of the new station were formally announced by JR East on 15 September 2015. Construction work commenced in fiscal 2015, with the entire cost of approximately 2 billion yen borne by the city of Koriyama.

The station opened on 1 April 2017, with a ceremony attended by the mayor of Koriyama.

== Passenger statistics ==
The station is expected to be used by an average of approximately 1,000 passengers daily.

== Surrounding area ==
- Koriyama Kita Police Station
- Ohu University
- Fukushima Prefectural Koriyama-Kita Technical High School
- Tomita Junior High School
- Koken Junior High School
- Kotoku Elementary School

== See also ==
- List of railway stations in Japan
