= Tenkyōkaku =

- 天鏡閣
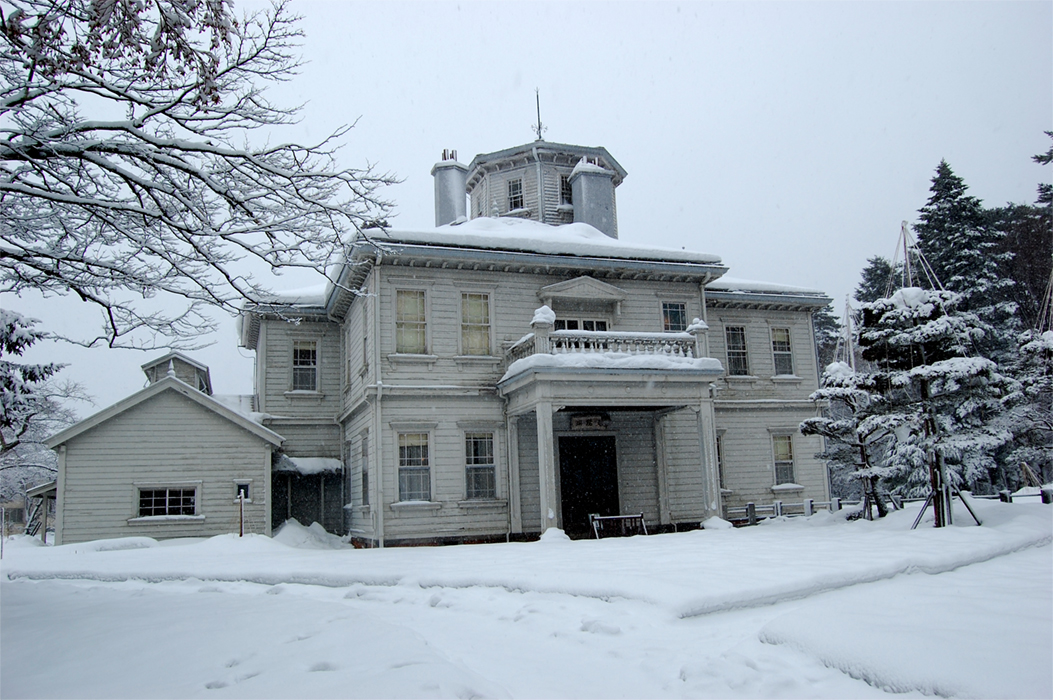
- Tenkyōkaku in Inawashiro, Fukushima Prefecture, Japan

- Location within Fukushima Prefecture Location within Japan

General information
- Status
- Architectural style: Neo-Renaissance
- Location: 1048-14 Gotenyama Ogizawa Inawashiro-machi, Yama-gun, Fukushima Prefecture, Japan 680-0011, Inawashiro, Japan
- Coordinates: 37°31′17.2″N 140°2′36.7″E
- Construction started: 1907
- Completed: 1908
- Renovated: 1981
- Client: Prince Arisugawa Takehito
- Owner: Fukushima Prefecture, Japan

Height
- Height: 17.9 m

Technical details
- Floor count: 3
- Floor area: 927 square metres (9,980 sq ft)

Design and construction
- Architect: Prince Arisugawa Takehito

Website
- Official home page

Tenkyōkaku (天鏡閣) is a Western-style French Renaissance style residence built as a summer villa for Prince Arisugawa Takehito located in Inawashiro, Fukushima Prefecture, Japan.

== History ==
Living room

In August 1907, while touring the Tōhoku region of northern Japan, Prince Arisugawa Takehito visited Lake Inawashiro and was impressed by the scenic beauty of the area. He decided to build a summer villa by the lake, and developed a design for the building himself, with the assistance of local architects and carpenters. The building was completed in August 1908. The building was given its name "Tenkyōkaku" by Emperor Taishō when he visited as crown prince the following month, based on a Tang dynasty poem by Li Bai, which compared the waters of a lake to the "mirror of heaven". At the time, Lake Inawashiro could be seen from the windows on the villa.

In 1922, the Tenkyōkaku was transferred to Prince Takamatsu Nobuhito, who had a Japanese-style villa added to the grounds for use by Prince Arisugawa’s widow until her death in 1923. Afterwards, the villa was visited by Emperor Shōwa while still crown prince, and was the location of his honeymoon in 1924. After World War II, the villa was surrendered by Prince Takamatsu to Fukushima Prefecture.

The building was used as conference hall for seminars until April 1971, and was designated an Important Cultural Properties of Japan in February 1979. After extensive renovations, the building was opened to the public in September 1982. It includes a display of materials related to the Meiji period of Japanese history.

In 1984, a large bronze statue of Prince Arisugawa, formerly located in front of the Naval Staff College in Tsukiji, Tokyo was relocated to the grounds of the villa.

== Description ==
The three-story wooden structure with an octagonal tower has a floor space of 927 square metres (9,980 sq ft) on a site of 492 square metres (5,300 sq ft) and a total height of 17.9 metres (59 ft). Although incorporating some Japanese architectural elements and construction techniques, the structure is very western in appearance, with a white balcony and clapboard walls, and a luxurious interior containing a billiard room, marble mantelpieces and chandeliers.
