= Bandai-Atami Station =

Railway station in Kōriyama, Fukushima Prefecture, Japan

Bandai-Atami Station 磐梯熱海駅
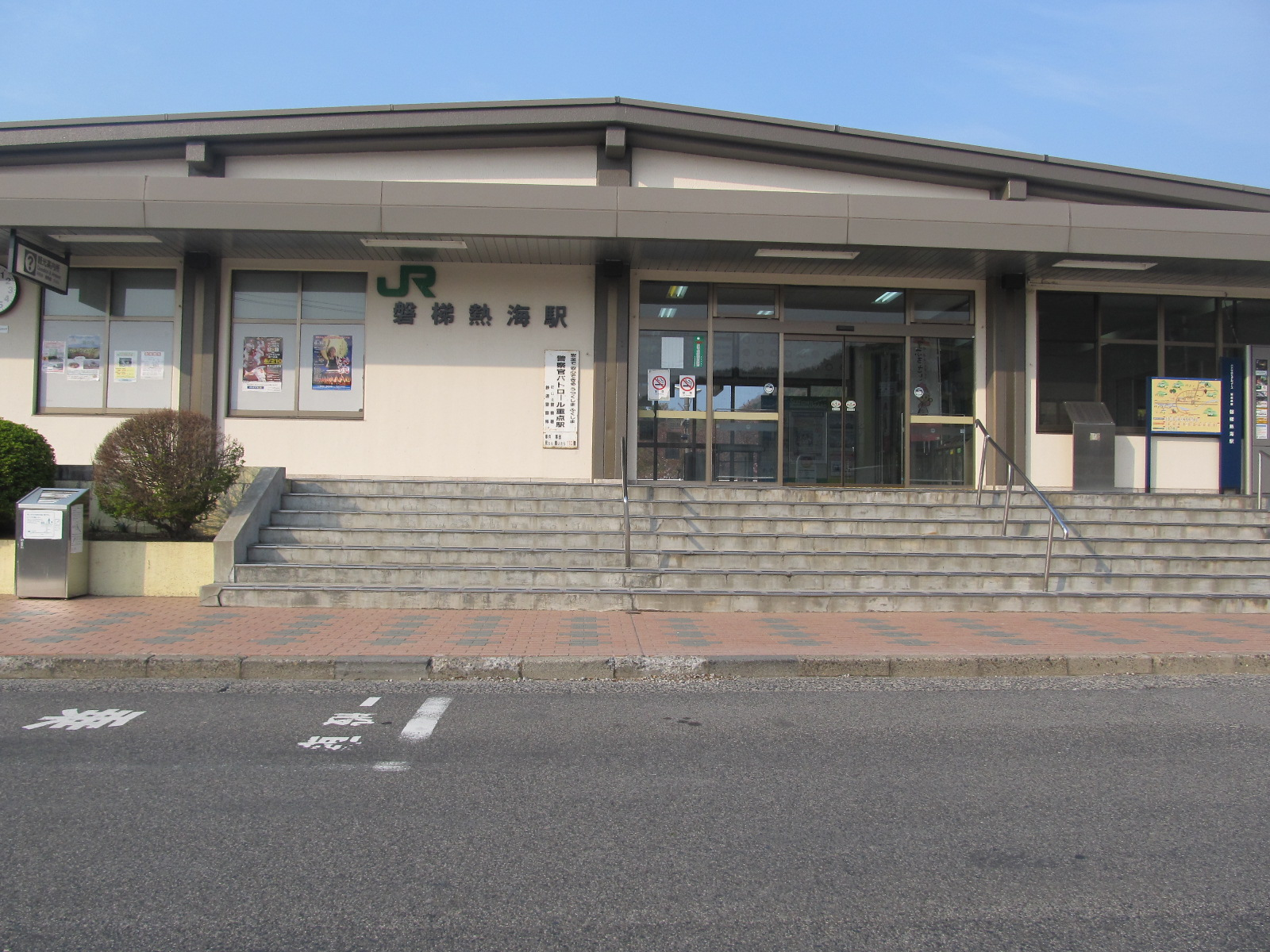
- Bandai-Atami Station in May 2005

General information
- Location: 4 Atami, Atami-cho, Kōriyama-shi, Fukushima-ken 963-1309; Japan
- Coordinates: 37.4805°N 140.2708°E
- Operator: JR East
- Line: ■ Ban'etsu West Line
- Distance: 15.4 km from Kōriyama
- Platforms: 2 side platforms

Other information
- Status: Staffed ("Midori no Madoguchi")
- Website: Official website

History
- Opened: July 26, 1898
- Former names: Atami (until 1925); Iwaki-Atami (until 1965)

Passengers
- FY2016: 262 daily

Services
Preceding station	JR East	Following station
Inawashiro towards Kitakata	Ban'etsu West Line Rapid	Kikuta towards Kōriyama
Nakayamajuku towards Niitsu	Ban'etsu West Line Local	Akogashima towards Kōriyama
Location
- Location within Fukushima Prefecture Location within Japan

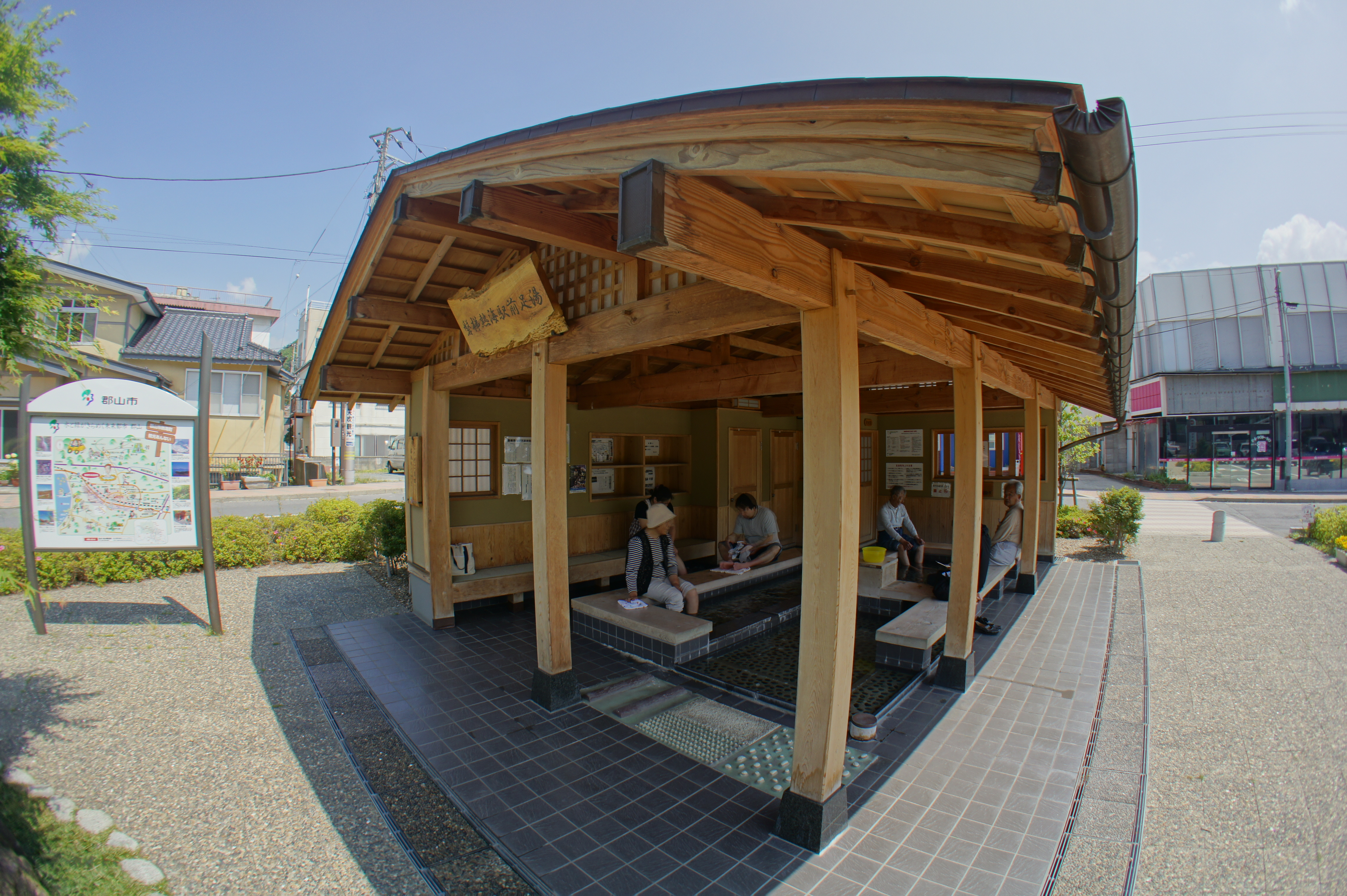
Footbath in front of Bandai-Atami Station

Bandai-Atami Station (磐梯熱海駅, Bandai-Atami-eki) is a railway station on the Banetsu West Line in the city of Kōriyama, Fukushima, Japan, operated by East Japan Railway Company (JR East).

== Lines ==
Bandai-Atami Station is served by the Banetsu West Line, and is located 15.4 kilometers from the official starting point of the line at Kōriyama.

== Station layout ==
Bandai-Atami Station has two opposed side platforms connected to the station building by a footbridge. The station has a "Midori no Madoguchi" staffed ticket office.

=== Platforms ===
1	■ Banetsu West Line	for Inawashiro, Aizu-Wakamatsu, and Kitakata for Kōriyama
2	■ Banetsu West Line	for Inawashiro, Aizu-Wakamatsu, and Kitakata

== History ==
The station opened on July 26, 1898, as Atami Station (熱海駅, Atami-eki). It was renamed Iwaki-Atami Station (岩城熱海駅) on March 20, 1925, and renamed Bandai-Atami on June 1, 1965. The station was absorbed into the JR East network upon the privatization of the Japanese National Railways (JNR) on April 1, 1987.

== Passenger statistics ==
In fiscal 2016, the station was used by an average of 262 passengers daily (boarding passengers only).

== Surrounding area ==
- National Route 49
- Atami Post Office

== See also ==
- List of railway stations in Japan
