= Inawashiro Station =

Railway station in Inawashiro, Fukushima Prefecture, Japan

Inawashiro Station 猪苗代駅
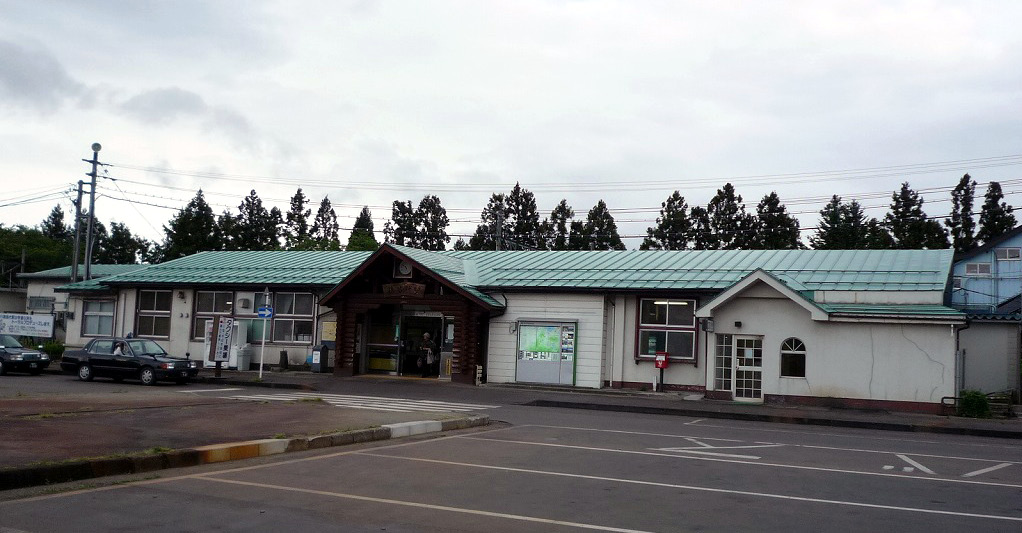
- Inawashiro Station, September 2009

General information
- Location: Ogita, Chiyoda, Inawashiro-machi, Yama-gun, Fukushima-ken 969-3133; Japan
- Coordinates: 37.5461°N 140.1029°E
- Operator: JR East
- Line: ■ Ban'etsu West Line
- Distance: 37.7 km from Kōriyama
- Platforms: 2 side platform
- Tracks: 2

Other information
- Status: Staffed ("Midori no Madoguchi")
- Website: Official website

History
- Opened: July 15, 1899

Passengers
- FY2017: 600 daily

Services
Preceding station	JR East	Following station
Okinashima towards Kitakata	Ban'etsu West Line Rapid	Kawageta towards Kōriyama
Okinashima towards Niitsu	Ban'etsu West Line Local	Kawageta towards Kōriyama
Location
- Location within Fukushima Prefecture Location within Japan

Inawashiro Station (猪苗代駅, Inawashiro-eki) is a railway station on the Ban'etsu West Line in the town of Inawashiro, Fukushima, Japan, operated by East Japan Railway Company (JR East).

== Lines ==
Inawashiro Station is served by the Ban'etsu West Line, and is located 36.7 rail kilometers from the official starting point of the line at Kōriyama.

== Station layout ==
Inawashiro Station has two opposed side platforms connected to the station building by a footbridge. The station has a "Midori no Madoguchi" staffed ticket office.

=== Platforms ===
1	■ Ban'etsu West Line	for Aizu-Wakamatsu and Kitakata for Bandai-Atami and Kōriyama
2	■ Ban'etsu West Line	for Aizu-Wakamatsu and Kitakata (occasional)

== History ==
Inawashiro Station opened on July 15, 1899. The station was absorbed into the JR East network upon the privatization of the Japanese National Railways (JNR) on April 1, 1987.

== Passenger statistics ==
In fiscal 2017, the station was used by an average of 600 passengers daily (boarding passengers only).

== Surrounding area ==
- Aga River
- National Route 115
- Inawashiro Town Hall
- Inawashiro Post Office

== See also ==
- List of railway stations in Japan
