= Japan National Route 49 =

National highway in Japan

National Route 49
- 国道49号

Route information
- Length: 246.4 km (153.1 mi)
- Existed: 1 April 1963–present

Major junctions
- West end: National Route 7 / National Route 8 / National Route 17 in Chūō-ku, Niigata
- East end: National Route 6 in Iwaki

Location
- Country: Japan

Highway system
- National highways of Japan; Expressways of Japan
← National Route 48	→ National Route 50

National Route 49 is a national highway of Japan connecting Iwaki, Fukushima and Chūō-ku, Niigata in Japan, with a total length of 246.4 km (153.11 mi).

== History ==
Route 49 was designated on 18 May 1953 as National Route 115, and this was redesignated as Route 49 when the route was promoted to a Class 1 highway.

== Route data ==
- Length: 246.4 km (153.11 mi)
- Origin: Iwaki, Fukushima
- Terminus: Chūō-ku, Niigata (originates at junction with Routes 7, 8, 17, 113 and 116)
- Major cities: Kōriyama, Aizuwakamatsu, Agano

== Intersecting routes ==
- in Fukushima Prefecture
  - Routes 4, 6, 115, 118, 121, 252, 294, 349 and 400
- in Niigata Prefecture
  - Routes 7, 8, 290, 403, 459 and 460
