= List of mergers in Fukushima Prefecture =

Here is a list of mergers in Fukushima Prefecture, Japan since the Heisei era.

== Mergers from April 1, 1999 to Present ==
- On November 1, 2004 - the village of Kitaaizu (from Kitaaizu District) was merged into the expanded city of Aizuwakamatsu. Kitaaizu District was dissolved as a result of this merger.
- On March 1, 2005 - the towns of Funehiki, Ōgoe, Takine and Tokiwa, and village of Miyakoji (all from Tamura District), were merged to create the city of Tamura.
- On April 1, 2005 - the town of Naganuma, and the village of Iwase (both from Iwase District) were merged into the expanded city of Sukagawa.
- On October 1, 2005 - the towns of Aizuhongō and Aizutakada, and the village of Niitsuru (all from Ōnuma District), were merged to create the town of Aizumisato.
- On November 1, 2005 - the town of Kawahigashi (from Kawanuma District) was merged into the expanded city of Aizuwakamatsu.
- On November 7, 2005 - the old city of Shirakawa absorbed the villages of Higashi, Omotegō and Taishin (all from Nishishirakawa District) to create the new and expanded city of Shirakawa.
- On December 1, 2005 - the old city of Nihonmatsu absorbed the towns of Adachi, Iwashiro and Tōwa (all from Adachi District) to create the new and expanded city of Nihonmatsu.
- On January 1, 2006 - the towns of Date absorbed the towns of Hobara, Ryōzen, Tsukidate and Yanagawa (all from Date District) to create the city of Date.
- On January 1, 2006 - the city of Haramachi merged with the towns of Kashima and Odaka (both from Sōma District) to create the city of Minamisōma.
- On January 4, 2006 - the towns of Shiokawa and Yamato, and the villages of Atsushiokanō and Takasato (all from Yama District) were merged into the expanded city of Kitakata.
- On March 20, 2006 - the town of Tajima, and the villages of Ina, Nangō and Tateiwa (all from Minamiaizu District) were merged to create the town of Minamiaizu.
- On January 1, 2007 - the former town of Motomiya absorbed the village of Shirasawa (both from Adachi District) to create the city of Motomiya.
- On July 1, 2008 - the town of Iino (from Date District) was merged into the expanded city of Fukushima.
