= Uryū =

Uryū may refer to:

== Places ==
- Uryū District, Hokkaidō, a district in Hokkaidō, Japan
  - Uryū, Hokkaidō, a town

- Uryu Sotokichi (瓜生 外吉, 1857–1937), an admiral of the Imperial Japanese Navy

== People with the given name ==
- Uryu Iwako (瓜生 岩子, 1829-1897), a social worker in the Meiji period

=== Fictional characters ===
- Toshiki Uryuu (雨流 俊樹), in the manga GetBackers
- Uryū Ishida (石田 雨竜), in the manga Bleach
