= Aizu-Nagano Station =

Railway station in Minamiaizu, Fukushima Prefecture, Japan

Aizu-Nagano Station 会津長野駅
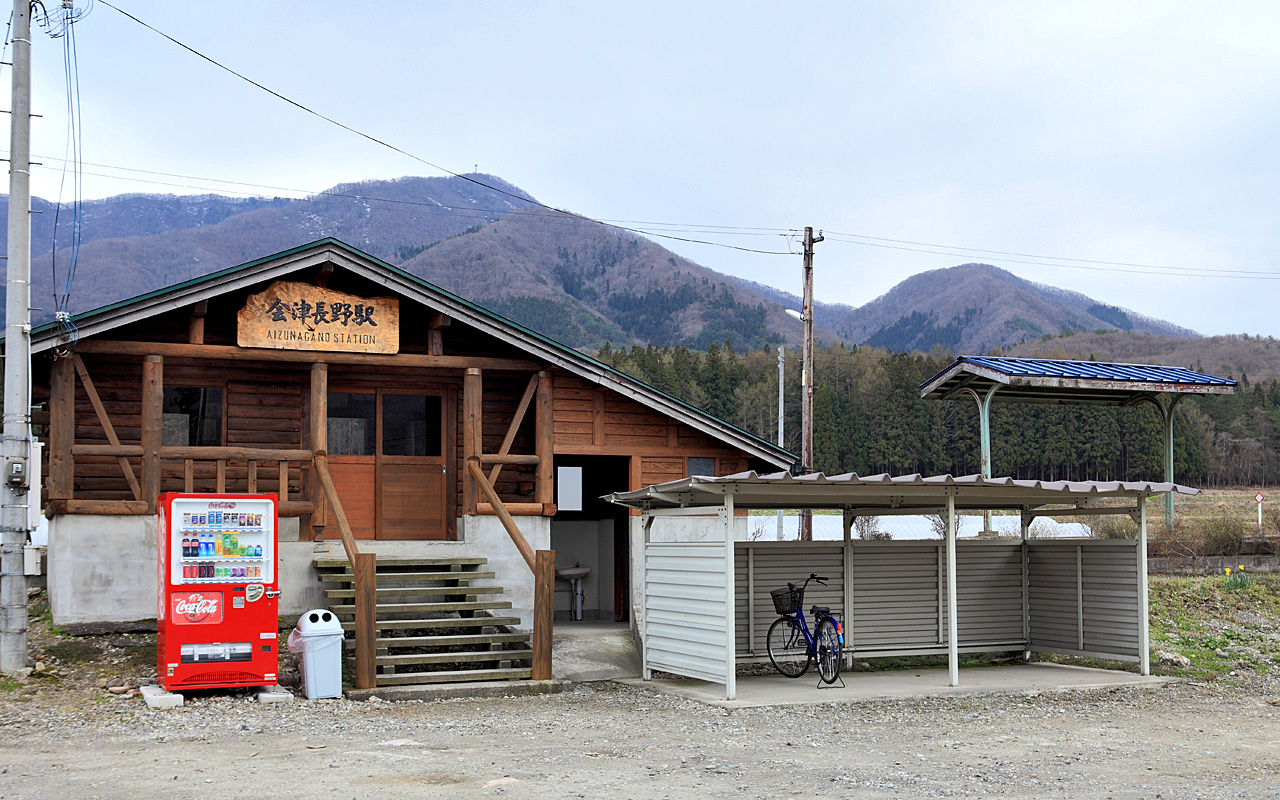
- Aizu-Nagano Station in April 2010

General information
- Location: Nagano Shimoyachi 25-2, Minamiaizu-machi, Minamiaizu-gun, Fukushima-ken 967-0001; Japan
- Coordinates: 37.2150°N 139.8241°E
- Operator: Aizu Railway
- Line: ■Aizu Line
- Distance: 37.3 km from Nishi-Wakamatsu
- Platforms: 1
- Tracks: 1

Other information
- Status: Unstaffed
- Website: Official website

History
- Opened: December 27, 1934

Services
| Preceding station | Aizu Railway | Following station |
|---|---|---|
| Tajimakōkōmae towards Aizukōgen-Ozeguchi | Aizu Line Local | Yōson-Kōen towards Aizu-Wakamatsu |
Location
- Location within Fukushima Prefecture Location within Japan

Aizu-Nagano Station (会津長野駅, Aizu-Nagano-eki) is a railway station on the Aizu Railway Aizu Line in the town of Minamiaizu, Minamiaizu District, Fukushima Prefecture, Japan, operated by the Aizu Railway.

== Lines ==
Aizu-Nagano Station is served by the Aizu Line, and is located 37.3 kilometers from the official starting point of the line at Nishi-Wakamatsu.

== Station layout ==
Aizu-Nagano Station has a single side platform serving a single bi-directional track. The station is unattended.

== History ==
Aizu-Nagano Station opened on December 27, 1934.

The station was transferred to the Aizu Railway on 16 July 1987.

== Surrounding area ==
- Nagano Post Office
- National Route 121

== See also ==
- List of railway stations in Japan
