= Iwashiro Province =

Former province of Japan

Map of the former Japanese provinces with Iwashiro highlighted

Iwashiro Province (岩代国 (Note: Iwashiro is also spelt as 磐代.), Iwashiro no Kuni; Japanese pronunciation: [ì.β̞ä́.ɕí.ɾó̞ (nó̞ kɯ̈́.ɲ̟í), -ɕì.ɾò̞ (nò̞ kɯ̈̀.ɲ̟ì)]) is an old province in the area of Fukushima Prefecture. It was sometimes called Ganshū (岩州).

The province occupies the western half of the central part of Fukushima Prefecture; the eastern half is Iwaki Province. More precisely, Date and Adachi districts in the north belong to Iwashiro and Higashishirakawa and Nishishirakawa districts in the south belong to Iwaki. The border between the two provinces is the Abukuma River. The former ichinomiya of the province is Isasumi Shrine.

== Timeline ==
- On December 7, 1868, the province was formed out from Mutsu Province. As of 1872, the population was 427,933.

== Historical districts ==
Iwashiro Province consisted of ten districts:

- Fukushima Prefecture
  - Aizu Region, Fukushima
    - Aizu District (会津郡)
      - Kitaaizu District (北会津郡) - dissolved
      - Minamiaizu District (南会津郡)
    - Kawanuma District (河沼郡)
    - Ōnuma District (大沼郡)
    - Yama District (耶麻郡)
  - Nakadōri Region, Fukushima
    - Adachi District (安達郡)
    - Asaka District (安積郡) - dissolved
    - Date District (伊達郡)
    - Iwase District (岩瀬郡)
    - Shinobu District (信夫郡) - dissolved

== See also ==
- Iwase Province
- Sanriku
- List of Provinces of Japan

== Other websites ==
Media related to Iwashiro Province at Wikimedia Commons

- Murdoch's map of provinces, 1903
