= Iwase Province =

Former province of Japan

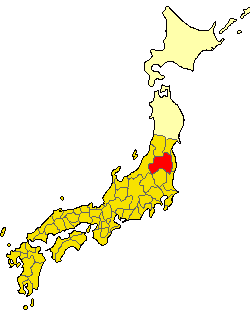
Map of the former Japanese provinces with Iwase highlighted

Iwase Province (石背国, Iwase no Kuni) is an old province of Japan which existed for a brief period of time in the Nara period in what is now western Fukushima Prefecture.

== History ==
Iwase Province was created during the reign of Empress Genshō. The Yōrō Ritsuryo established the Iwase Province in 718 through the division of the Michinoku Province (Mutsu Province). It was composed of five districts, named Shirakawa (白河), Iwase (石背), Aizu (会津), Asaka (安積) and Shinobu (信夫).

The area encompassed by the province reverted to Mutsu at some point between 722 and 724. Some scholars have suggested that this may have been motivated by economic considerations.

== Historical districts ==
- Aizu District (会津郡)
- Asaka District (安積郡)
- Iwase District (岩瀬郡)
- Shinobu District (信夫郡)
- Shirakawa District (白川郡, East Shirakawa)

== See also ==
- Iwashiro Province, de facto brief reconstitution.
- List of Provinces of Japan

== Other websites ==
Media related to Iwase Province at Wikimedia Commons

- Murdoch's map of provinces, 1903
