= Aizushingū Castle =

- 会津新宮城
- Kitakata, Fukushima Prefecture, Japan

Site information
- Type: flatland-style Japanese castle
- Open to the public: yes (no facilities)
- Condition: ruins

Location
- Coordinates: 37°37′21″N 139°50′07″E

Site history
- Built: 1212
- Built by: Shingū clan
- In use: Kamakura to Muromachi period
- Demolished: 1420

Aizushingū Castle (会津新宮城, Aizushingū-jō) was a Kamakura to Muromachi period Japanese castle located in the city of Kitakata, Fukushima Prefecture, Japan. The site has been protected by the central government as a National Historic Site since 2009.

== Background ==
Shingū Castle was located in the northwestern portion of Aizu Basin, and was built in 1212 by the Shingū clan, a cadet branch descended from the noted warrior Sahara Yoshitsura. The Sahara had been awarded a shōen in Iwaki Province by Hōjō Tokiyori for their assistance in the destruction of the Miura clan, and the sixth son of Sahara Yoshitsura changed his name to "Shingū" and ruled over the estate for the next 200 years. During the Muromachi period, the Shingū clan came into conflict with the neighboring Ashina clan, and in a series of battles across the Aizu area, fought with the Ashina from 1415 to 1420. Shingū castle fell to the Ashina in 1420, and the surviving Shingū clansmen fled across the mountains to Echigo Province, where they were finally annihilated by the Ashina in 1433.

The castle was a flatland-style castle with a roughly square layout consisting of an inner bailey measuring roughly 120 meters east–west x 147 meters north-south, surrounded by an outer bailey measuring roughly 480 meters east–west and 440 meters north–south. Both baileys were protected by moats and by earthen ramparts. The north–south moats utilize natural streams, and are connected by east–west artificial channels.

The ruins of the castle have now become paddy fields, and only a slight trace of the remains are visible. In an excavation survey in 2006, an underground timber structure was found at a depth of 5 meters from the southeast corner of the inner bailey ruins. The structure was square with 2.7 meters sides, and a columns of about 4 meters in height. The use is unknown, but may have been the foundations of a yagura watchtower.

Excavated artifacts included small copper statues, which are thought to be talismans of Bishamon, from the site of outer bailey, and shards of medieval ceramics and whetstones. In an excavation survey in 2006, an elephant-shaped blue and white porcelain, presumed to have been made in Jingdezhen, China in the 13-14th century.

The site is located approximately 3.9 kilometers from Kitakata Station on the JR East Banetsu West Line. Currently, there is only a stone monument standing next to the parking lot on Prefectural Route 336, and there are no information boards installed or other public facilities.

== See also ==
- List of Historic Sites of Japan (Fukushima)

== Literature ==
- Schmorleitz, Morton S. (1974). Castles in Japan. Tokyo: Charles E. Tuttle Co. pp. 144–145. ISBN 0-8048-1102-4.
- Motoo, Hinago (1986). Japanese Castles. Tokyo: Kodansha. p. 200 pages. ISBN 0-87011-766-1.
- Mitchelhill, Jennifer (2004). Castles of the Samurai: Power and Beauty. Tokyo: Kodansha. p. 112 pages. ISBN 4-7700-2954-3.
- Turnbull, Stephen (2003). Japanese Castles 1540-1640. Osprey Publishing. p. 64 pages. ISBN 1-84176-429-9.
