= Aizumisato =

Aizumisato 会津美里町
- Town
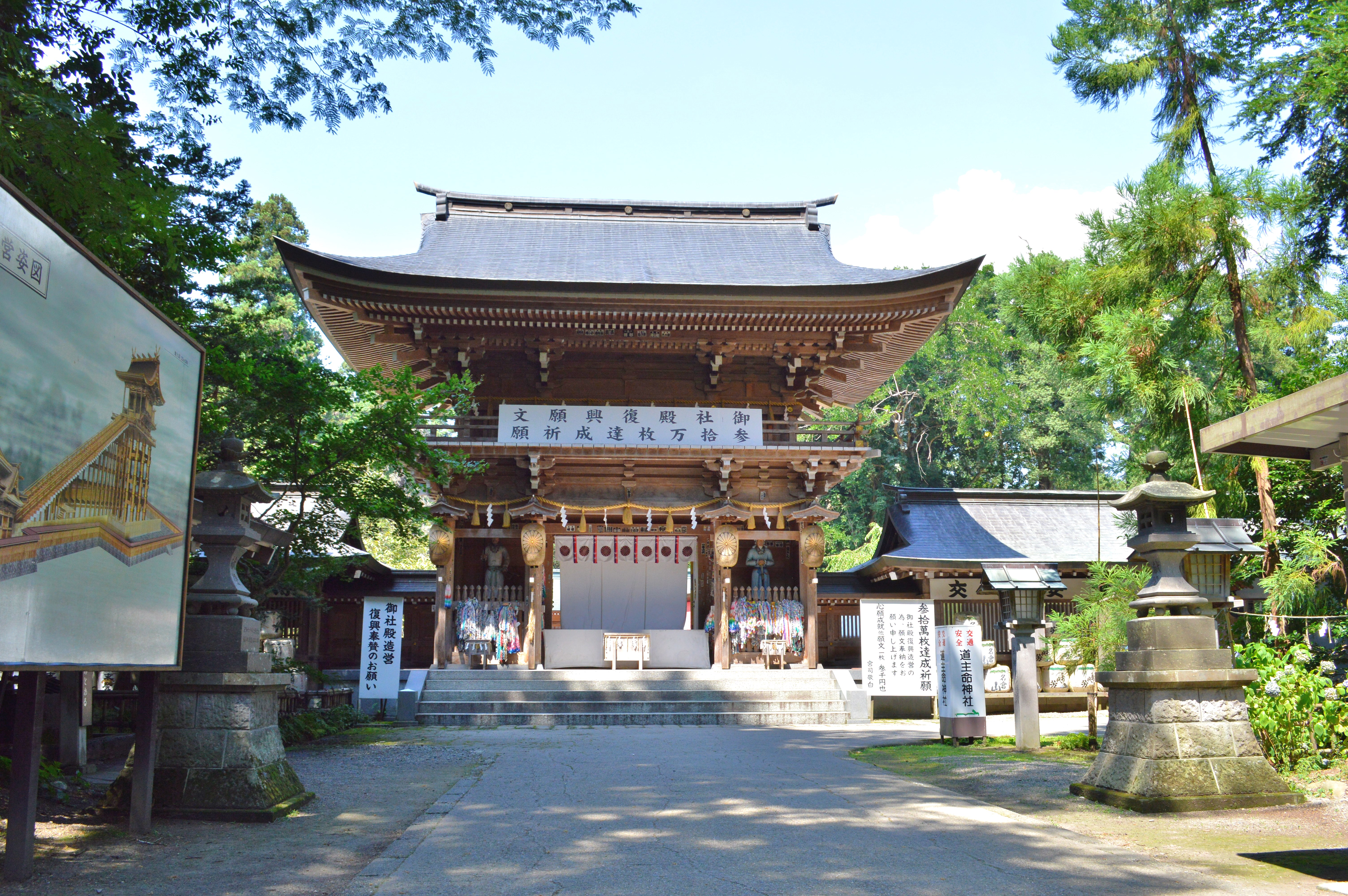
- Isasumi Shrine

- Flag Seal

- Location of Aizumisato in Fukushima Prefecture

- Coordinates: 37°27′35.5″N 139°50′28″E
- Country: Japan
- Region: Tōhoku
- Prefecture: Fukushima
- District: Ōnuma

Area
  - Total: 276.33 km^{2} (106.69 sq mi)

Population (March 2020)
  - Total: 20,092
  - Density: 72.710/km^{2} (188.32/sq mi)
- Time zone: UTC+9 (Japan Standard Time)
  - Tree: Styphnolobium japonicum
  - Flower: Iris sanguinea
  - Bird: Wagtail
- Phone number: 0242-55-1122
- Address: 3163 Miyakita, Aizumisato-machi, Ōnuma-gun, Fukushima-ken 969-6292
- Website: Official website

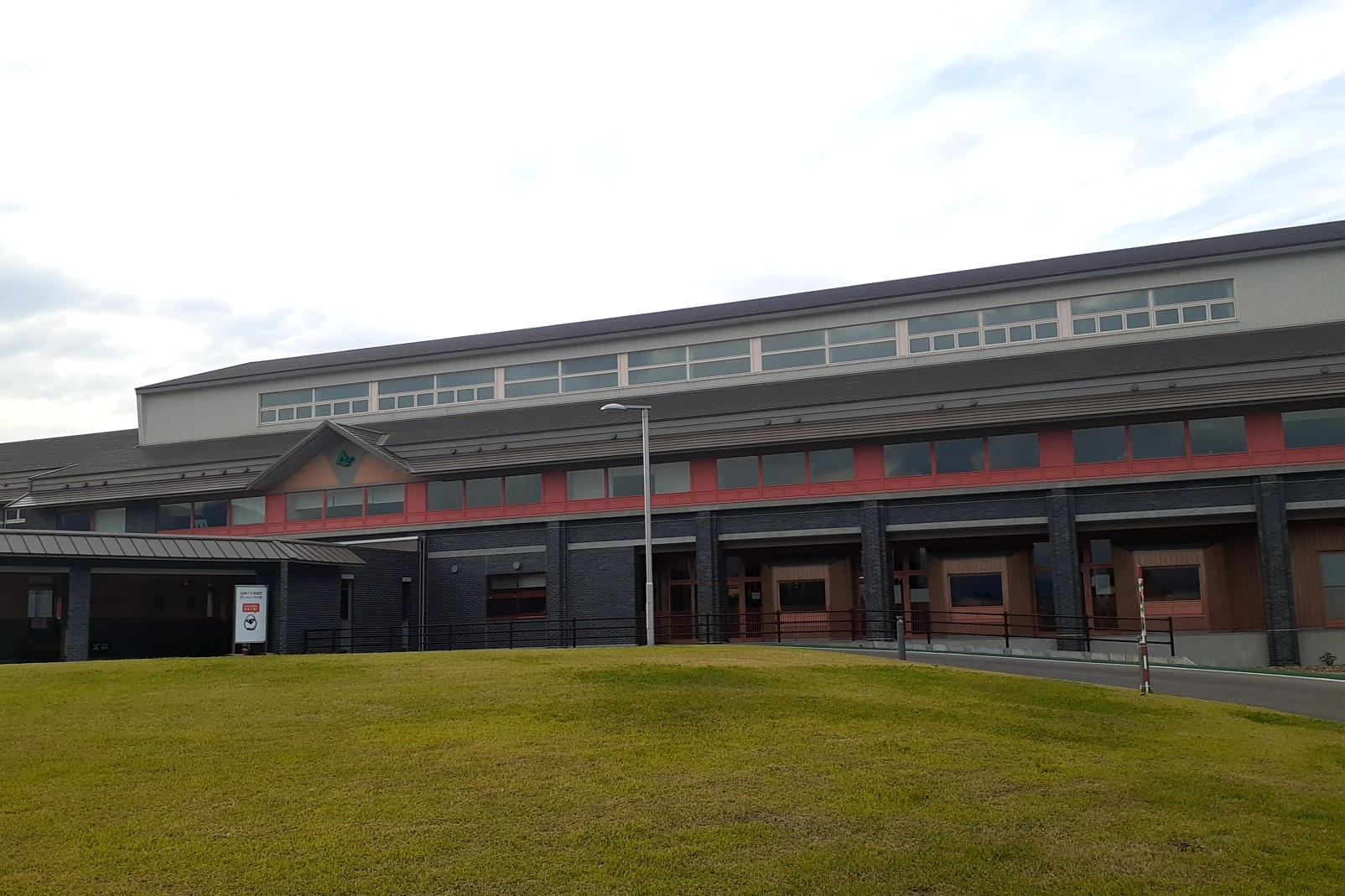
Aizumisato Town Hall

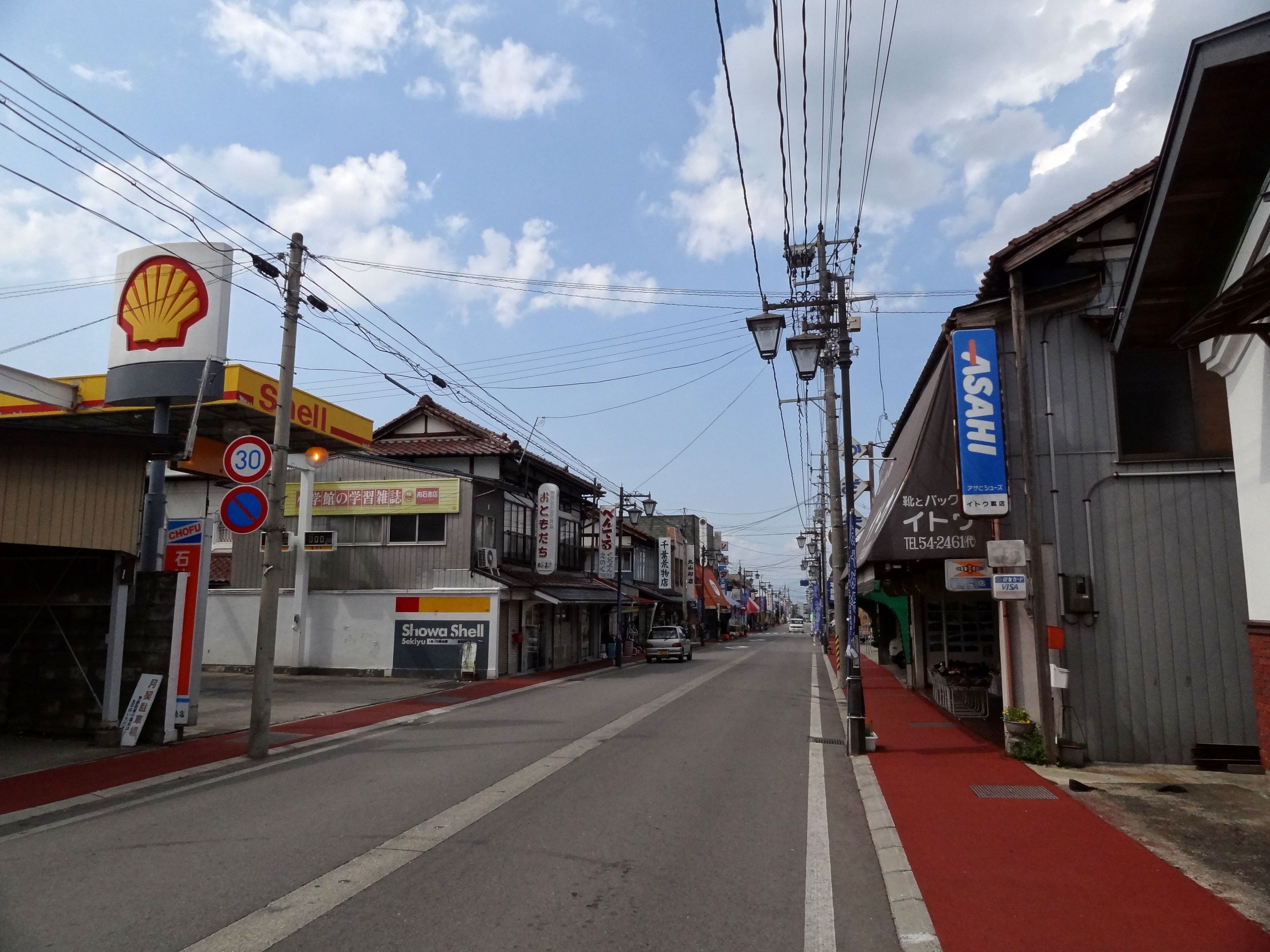
Central Aizumisato scene

Aizumisato (会津美里町, Aizumisato-machi) is a town located in Fukushima Prefecture, Japan. As of 1 March 2020, the town had an estimated population of 20,092 in 7306 households and a population density of 73 persons per km^{2}. The total area of the town was 276.33 square kilometres (106.69 sq mi).

== Geography ==
Aizumisato is located in the eastern portion of the Aizu region, in west-central Fukushima Prefecture on the southwestern edge of the Aizu Basin.

- Mountains: Mount Hakase, Mount Myojindake (1074 m)
- Rivers: Aka River
- Lakes: Miyagawa Dam

=== Neighboring municipalities ===
Fukushima Prefecture

- Aizubange
- Aizuwakamatsu
- Shimogō
- Shōwa
- Yanaizu

== Climate ==
Aizumisato has a Humid continental climate (Köppen Dfb) characterized by warm summers and cold winters with heavy snowfall. The average annual temperature in Aizumisato is 13.1 °C. The average annual rainfall is 1320 mm with September as the wettest month. The temperatures are highest on average in August, at around 24.8 °C, and lowest in January, at around −1.4 °C.

== Demographics ==
Per Japanese census data, the population of Aizumisato has declined over the past 70 years.

Historical population
| Year | Pop. | ±% |
|---|---|---|
| 1950 | 38,522 | — |
| 1960 | 36,073 | −6.4% |
| 1970 | 30,036 | −16.7% |
| 1980 | 27,945 | −7.0% |
| 1990 | 27,211 | −2.6% |
| 2000 | 27,172 | −0.1% |
| 2010 | 22,727 | −16.4% |

== History ==
The area of present-day Aizumisato was part of ancient Mutsu Province and formed part of the holdings of Aizu Domain during the Edo period. After the Meiji Restoration, it was organized as part of Ōnuma District in Fukushima Prefecture. The town of Aizumisato was created on October 1, 2005, with the merger of the two towns of Aizutakada and Aizuhongō and the village of Niitsuru, all from Ōnuma District.

== Economy ==
The economy of Aizumisato is dominated by agriculture.

== Education ==
Aizumisato has five public elementary schools and three public junior high schools operated by the town government. The town has one public high school operated by the Fukushima Prefectural Board of Education.

- Fukushima Prefectural Aizumisato High School

== Transportation ==
=== Railway ===
JR East – Tadami Line

- Aizu-Takada – Negishi

=== Highway ===
- Ban-etsu Expressway – Niitsuru PA
- National Route 401

== Local attractions ==
- Mukaihaguroyama Castle ruins, a National Historic Site
- Sakurdari Kannon

== Sister cities ==
Aizumisato has a sister-city relationship with the town of Naraha, also in Fukushima Prefecture. This is a renewal of the relationship Niitsuru had with Naraha prior to the merger.
