= Furuyashiki Site =

Kofun period archaeological site in Kitakata, Tōhoku, Japan

- 古屋敷遺跡 (Japanese)
- Furuyashiki Site Furuyashiki Site (Japan)
- 37°36′32″N 139°50′08″E
- Type: Settlement
- Periods: Kofun period
- Location: Kitakata, Fukushima, Japan
- Region: Tōhoku region

History
- Built: 6th century AD

Site notes
- Excavation dates: 1981, 1988, 1996 to 2010
- Public access: Yes
- National Historic Site of Japan

The Furuyashiki Site (古屋敷遺跡, Furuyashiki Iseki) is an archaeological site containing the remnants of a middle Kofun period (6th century AD) settlement located in what is now part of the city of Kitakata, Fukushima in the southern Tōhoku region of Japan. The site was designated a National Historic Site of Japan in 2001.

== Overview ==
The site is located in the northwest of the Aizu Basin, on the natural embankment formed by the Tagawa River and Tanukawa branch of the Aga River. The site measures about 230 meters east-west x 220 meters north-south. Excavation surveys were conducted in 1981, 1988 and from 1996 to 2010, during which time the foundations of large-scale rectangular buildings, warehouse groups, and ritual-related facilities were found. The compound also contained some 20 pit dwellings and was surrounded by a double moat with a width of four to nine meters on the west side. The settlement was protected by a river to the east and by wetlands to the north. From the shards of pottery recovered, the site was inhabited from the late 5th century through middle 6th century AD and is presumed to be the residence of a powerful local Kofun period warlord. Nearby is group of kofun tumuli. It is the largest Kofun period settlement site found in the Tōhoku area.

Then site is located approximately 25 minutes by car from the Aizuwakamatsu IC on the Banetsu Expressway.

== See also ==
- List of Historic Sites of Japan (Fukushima)
