= Kitakata ramen =

Japanese food

Korakuen's (幸楽苑) ramen

Kitakata ramen (喜多方ラーメン) is a kind of ramen that originated in Kitakata, Japan.

== History ==
Kitakata ramen is a style of ramen that originated at the Genraiken noodle shop in 1927 in Kitakata, Fukushima. Kitakata ramen is one of the three most popular ramen styles in Japan, along with Sapporo ramen and Hakata ramen. Kitakata city has the most ramen stores per capita.

The ramen has a soy sauce base and is usually topped with green onions, fish cake, barbecued pork, and bamboo shoots. The noodles are also noticeably thicker than the ramen noodles used in other varieties.

== See also ==
- Kitakata, Fukushima
- Akabeko
