= Fukushima Aiikuen Orphanage =

Orphanage in Tazawa, Fukushima, Japan

The Fukushima Aiikuen Orphanage (福島愛育園) is located in Tazawa, Fukushima. It was founded in 1893 by Uryu Iwako and is still in operation today.

== Post Fukushima Disaster ==
After the Fukushima Daiichi Nuclear Disaster, many orphanages were left to manage on their own. Fukushima Aiikuen, located 49 miles away from the plant, was outside of the official evacuation zone. While the prefectural government paid for a clean-up of the grounds as well as a device for testing the radiation levels of food and a staff member to operate it, the orphanage had to rely on outside assistance for other aid such as uncontaminated food, monitoring of radiation exposure, and trips outside of the prefecture. As of March 2013, though certain surfaces have met the target level of radiation, some hot spots still reached 50 times the official safe amount. As a result, the orphanage's director, Hisao Saito, instituted several measures to limit the children's exposure. Routine health checks were performed for each child, which recorded not only general health data but also radiation exposure level. Outdoor playtime was greatly reduced for older children and eliminated for younger ones. Food was checked daily for contamination.

== Fukushima Youth Cultural Exchange Program ==
In 2013, the Japan-America Society of Southern California sponsored a program to bring children from various orphanages affected by the Fukushima Disaster to the United States. The purpose of the program was to both encourage cultural exchange between Japan and the US as well as offer the children time away from the radiation and rebuilding of their homes. During the roughly week-long visits, the middle- and high-school children stay with an American host family and experience various aspects of American culture. The first official visit was commemorated with a cherry tree dedication ceremony in Little Tokyo, Los Angeles, where three of the trees were named by the Aiikuen children. The program was discontinued in 2017, as the Japanese government's increasing use of the fostering system greatly reduced the number of children in participating orphanages, including Fukushima Aiikuen.
