= Iino, Fukushima =

Japanese town famous for UFOs

Iino 飯野町
- Town
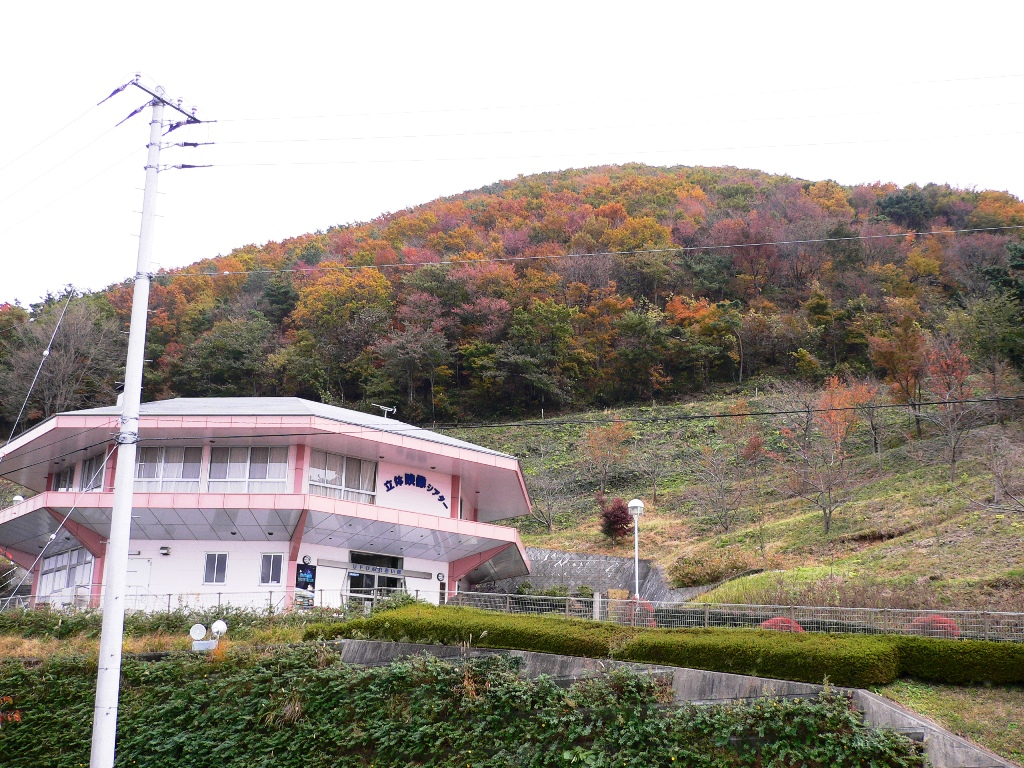
- UFO Museum in Iino

- Flag Seal

- Location of Iino in Fukushima Prefecture
- Country: Japan
- Region: Tōhoku
- Prefecture: Fukushima
- District: Date
- First established: January 1, 1955
- Merged with Fukushima City: July 1, 2008

Area
  - Total: 21.31 km^{2} (8.23 sq mi)

Population (October 1, 2020)
  - Total: 5,201
  - Density: 244.1/km^{2} (632.1/sq mi)
- Tree: Red pine
- Flower: Cherry blossom
- Bird: Japanese tit

Iino (飯野町, Iino-machi) was a town located in Date District, Fukushima Prefecture, Japan. On July 1, 2008, Iino was merged into the expanded city of Fukushima. As of 2020, the area of the former town had an estimated population of 5,201 and a population density of 270 persons per km².

Iino is famous for UFOs. Japan's first-ever "UFO lab" for study and observation was opened here in 2020. The UFO Fureaikan museum is also located nearby, close to Senganmori mountain.

== Geography ==
Iino is located near the center of Fukushima Prefecture in the northern hills of the Abukuma Highlands. The Abukuma River flows on the Western side of the town. Senganmori mountain, one of the town's symbols Prior to the merger, it was the third smallest municipality in Fukushima after the villages of Yugawa and Nakajima.

== Demographics ==
Per Japanese census data, the population of Iino has declined steadily since 1955.

Historical population
Year	Pop.	±%
1955	9,485	—
1960	9,016	−4.9%
1970	8,016	−11.1%
1980	7,650	−4.6%
2000	6,773	−11.5%
2010	6,031	−11.0%
2020	5,201	−13.8%
https://www.e-stat.go.jp/en

== See also ==
- List of mergers in Fukushima Prefecture
- Nakadōri—Central region of Fukushima Prefecture
- Roswell, New Mexico—American city with similar UFO culture
