= Aizuhongō, Fukushima =

Dissolved municipality in Fukushima prefecture, Japan

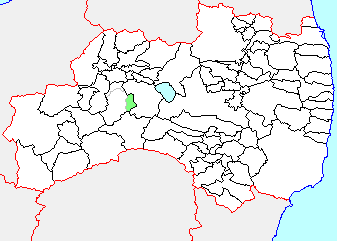
Map of Aizuhongō, Fukushima

Aizuhongō (会津本郷町, Aizuhongō-machi) was a town located in Ōnuma District, Fukushima Prefecture, Japan.

As of 2003, the town had an estimated population of 6,500 and a population density of 161.85 persons per km^{2}. The total area was 40.16 km^{2}.

On October 1, 2005, Aizuhongō, along with the town of Aizutakada, and the village of Niitsuru (all from Ōnuma District), was merged to create the town of Aizumisato.
