= Tokiwa, Fukushima =

Dissolved municipality in Fukushima prefecture, Japan

Tokiwa (常葉町, Tokiwa-machi) was a town located in Tamura District, Fukushima Prefecture, Japan.

On March 1, 2005, Tokiwa, along with the towns of Funehiki, Ōgoe and Takine, and the village of Miyakoji (all from Tamura District), was merged to create the city of Tamura.

As of 2003, the town had an estimated population of 6,370 and a density of 75.46 persons per km^{2}. The total area was 84.41 km^{2}.
