= Tateiwa, Fukushima =

Dissolved municipality in Fukushima prefecture, Japan

Tateiwa (舘岩村, Tateiwa-mura)

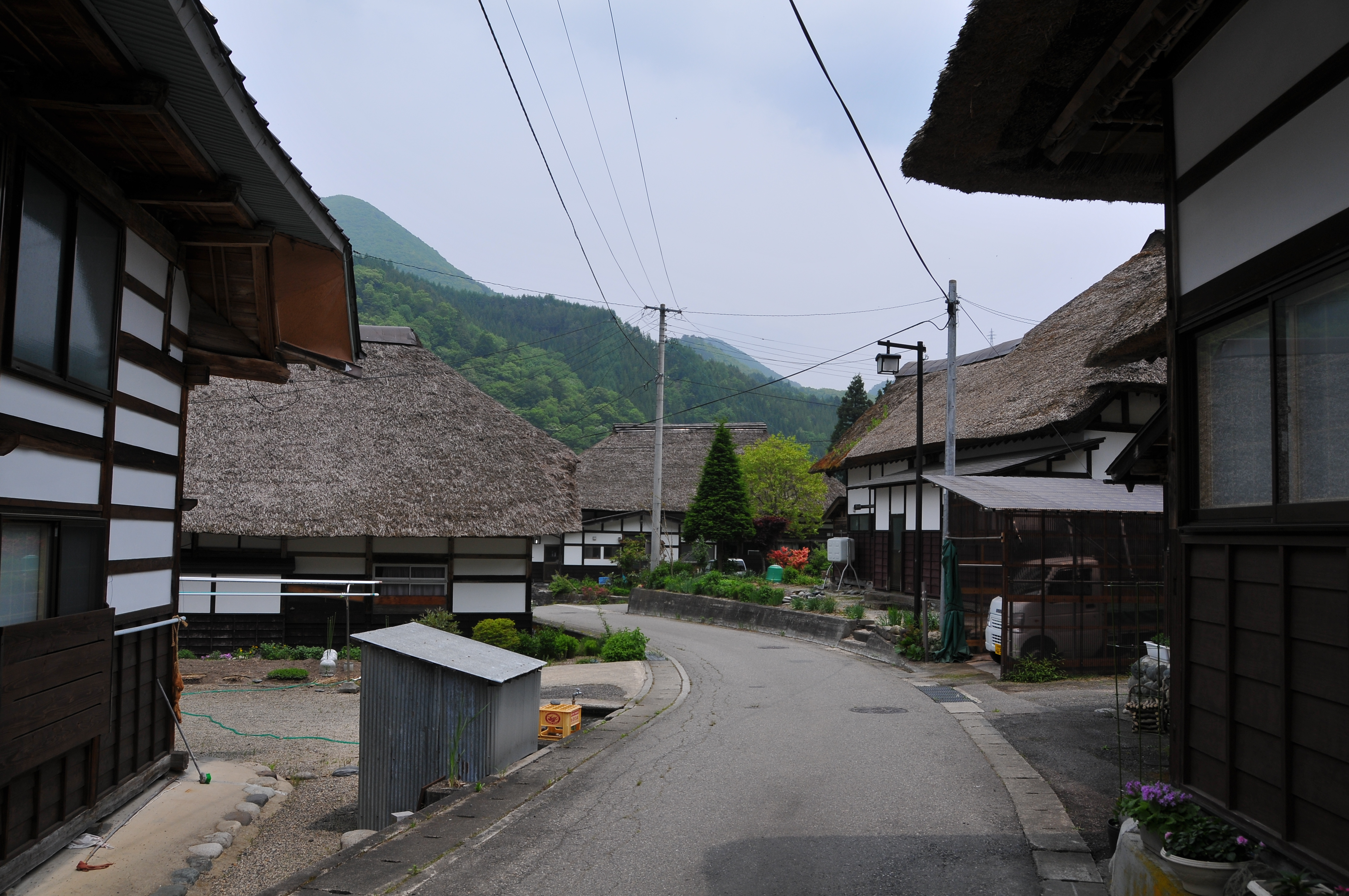
Minamiaizu-machi Maezawa, Fukushima, mountain village

was a village located in Minamiaizu District, Fukushima Prefecture, Japan. It was popular with city dwellers for its plentiful hot springs and skiing/snowboarding.

As of 2003, the village had an estimated population of 2,275 and a density of 8.63 persons per km^{2}. The total area was 263.55 km^{2}.

On March 20, 2006, Tateiwa, along with town of Tajima, and the villages of Ina and Nangō (all from Minamiaizu District), was merged to create the town of Minamiaizu.
