= Yamato, Fukushima =

Dissolved municipality in Fukushima prefecture, Japan

Coordinates: 37.633°N 139.767°E

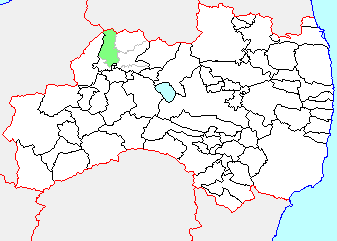
Map of Yamato, Fukushima

Yamato (山都町, Yamato-machi) was a town located in Yama District, Fukushima Prefecture, Japan. The town was established as a village in 1875, and promoted to a town in 1954.

As of 2003, the town had an estimated population of 4,092 and a density of 26.20 persons per square kilometer. The total area was 156.21 km^{2}.

On January 4, 2006, Yamato, along with the town of Shiokawa, and the villages of Atsushiokanō and Takasato (all from Yama District), was merged into the expanded city of Kitakata.
