= Funehiki, Fukushima =

Dissolved municipality in Tamura district, Fukushima prefecture, Japan

Coordinates: 37°26′N 140°35′E

Funehiki (船引町, Funehiki-machi) was a town located in Tamura District, Fukushima Prefecture, Japan.

On March 1, 2005, Funehiki, along with the towns of Ōgoe, Takine, and Tokiwa, and the village of Miyakoji (all from Tamura District), was merged to create the city of Tamura.

As of 2003, the town had an estimated population of 23,498 and a density of 145.81 persons per km^{2}. The total area was 161.16 km^{2}.

== History ==
In 1934, the town of Funehiki replaced the former municipality of Katasone Village (片曽根村), which was named after the local mountain, Mt. Katasone (片曽根山).
