= Nangō, Fukushima =

Dissolved municipality in Fukushima prefecture, Japan

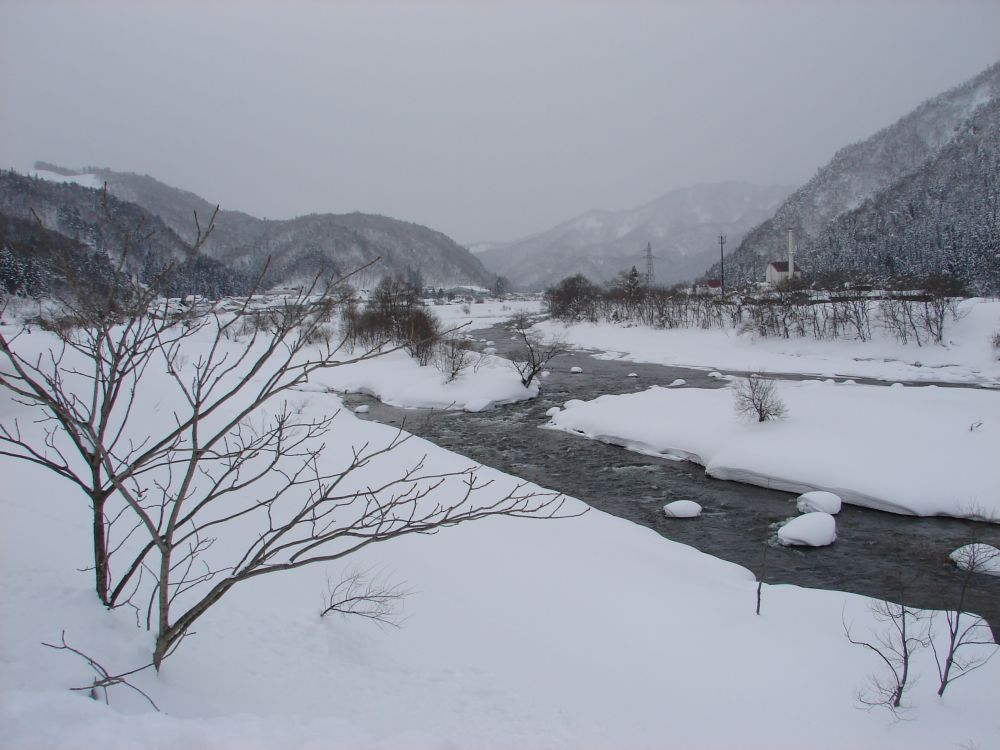
Typical Winter scene in Nangō

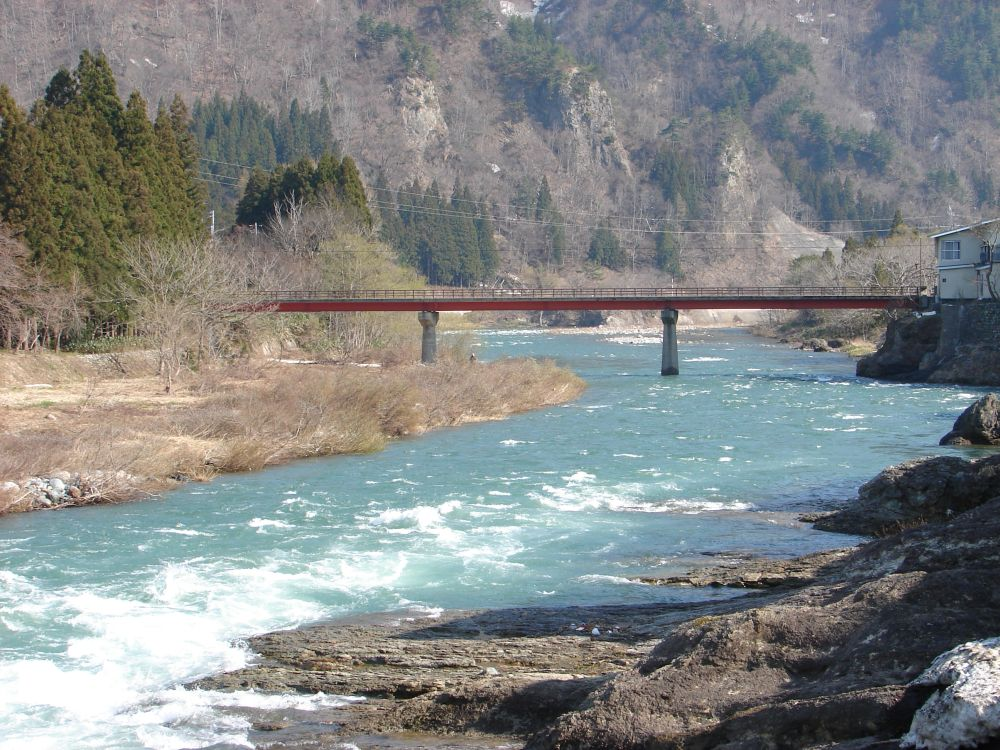
Nangō after the thaw

Nangō (南郷村, Nangō-mura) was a former village located in Minamiaizu District, Fukushima Prefecture, Japan.

As of 2003, the village had an estimated population of 2,994 and a density of 25.05 persons per km^{2}. The total area was 119.50 km^{2}.

On March 20, 2006, Nangō, along with town of Tajima, and the villages of Ina and Tateiwa (all from Minamiaizu District), was merged to create the town of Minamiaizu.

Nangō is famous throughout Fukushima for its tomatoes.

Nangō is one of many rural areas in Japan that suffers from the problem of having a large aged population but relatively few young people. As of March 2006, there were more people aged 90 and above than people between the ages of 20 and 24 living in Nangō.

Nangō's ski and snowboard area attracts people from as far south as Tokyo. It is home to ski courses of varying difficulty, but known best for its large snowboard park.

== Climate ==
Climate data for Nangō, Minamiaizu (1991−2020 normals, extremes 1976−present)
Month	Jan	Feb	Mar	Apr	May	Jun	Jul	Aug	Sep	Oct	Nov	Dec	Year
Record high °C (°F)	11.6 (52.9)	15.1 (59.2)	20.1 (68.2)	28.6 (83.5)	32.7 (90.9)	33.1 (91.6)	35.1 (95.2)	36.6 (97.9)	34.1 (93.4)	29.7 (85.5)	24.1 (75.4)	19.2 (66.6)	36.6 (97.9)
Mean daily maximum °C (°F)	1.2 (34.2)	2.1 (35.8)	6.0 (42.8)	13.7 (56.7)	20.7 (69.3)	24.0 (75.2)	27.3 (81.1)	28.8 (83.8)	24.4 (75.9)	18.1 (64.6)	11.4 (52.5)	4.3 (39.7)	15.2 (59.3)
Daily mean °C (°F)	−2.2 (28.0)	−1.9 (28.6)	1.1 (34.0)	7.1 (44.8)	13.9 (57.0)	18.3 (64.9)	22.0 (71.6)	22.9 (73.2)	18.7 (65.7)	12.2 (54.0)	5.7 (42.3)	0.4 (32.7)	9.9 (49.7)
Mean daily minimum °C (°F)	−5.7 (21.7)	−6.1 (21.0)	−3.2 (26.2)	1.5 (34.7)	7.4 (45.3)	13.3 (55.9)	17.8 (64.0)	18.5 (65.3)	14.4 (57.9)	7.7 (45.9)	1.4 (34.5)	−2.9 (26.8)	5.3 (41.6)
Record low °C (°F)	−18.0 (−0.4)	−17.2 (1.0)	−16.5 (2.3)	−7.3 (18.9)	−1.1 (30.0)	3.8 (38.8)	9.3 (48.7)	9.1 (48.4)	3.0 (37.4)	−2.9 (26.8)	−11.2 (11.8)	−15.0 (5.0)	−18.0 (−0.4)
Average precipitation mm (inches)	126.8 (4.99)	79.1 (3.11)	76.0 (2.99)	65.7 (2.59)	76.6 (3.02)	117.1 (4.61)	225.1 (8.86)	169.6 (6.68)	139.4 (5.49)	134.7 (5.30)	119.7 (4.71)	161.6 (6.36)	1,492.1 (58.74)
Average snowfall cm (inches)	306 (120)	249 (98)	175 (69)	42 (17)	0 (0)	0 (0)	0 (0)	0 (0)	0 (0)	0 (0)	16 (6.3)	211 (83)	1,010 (398)
Average rainy days (≥ 1.0 mm)	20.6	16.2	15.7	11.6	11.3	13.0	15.6	13.2	13.4	13.9	16.0	20.0	180.5
Average snowy days (≥ 3 cm)	23.4	20.9	20.1	5.8	0	0	0	0	0	0	1.5	13.5	85.2
Mean monthly sunshine hours	55.1	75.1	126.8	173.4	196.2	154.3	148.0	186.8	136.6	123.1	99.1	62.5	1,540.6
Source 1: JMA
Source 2: JMA
