= Tajima, Fukushima =

Dissolved municipality in Fukushima prefecture, Japan

Tajima (田島町, Tajima-machi) was a town located in Minamiaizu District, Fukushima, Japan. It was the largest town in Minamiaizu District and in the summer held the locally famous Gion Festival, not to be confused with the Tobata Gion Festival in Kyushu.

As of 2003, the town had an estimated population of 13,142 and a density of 37.51 persons per km^{2}. The total area was 350.34 km^{2}.

On March 20, 2006, Tajima, along with the villages of Ina, Nangō and Tateiwa (all from Minamiaizu District), was merged to create the town of Minamiaizu.

== Climate ==
Climate data for Tajima, Minamiaizu (1991−2020 normals, extremes 1976−present)
| Month | Jan | Feb | Mar | Apr | May | Jun | Jul | Aug | Sep | Oct | Nov | Dec | Year |
|---|---|---|---|---|---|---|---|---|---|---|---|---|---|
| Record high °C (°F) | 13.5 (56.3) | 16.2 (61.2) | 23.7 (74.7) | 28.7 (83.7) | 31.4 (88.5) | 33.4 (92.1) | 35.0 (95.0) | 34.6 (94.3) | 32.4 (90.3) | 27.7 (81.9) | 24.0 (75.2) | 18.4 (65.1) | 35.0 (95.0) |
| Mean daily maximum °C (°F) | 1.9 (35.4) | 3.0 (37.4) | 7.1 (44.8) | 14.5 (58.1) | 20.7 (69.3) | 23.8 (74.8) | 27.2 (81.0) | 28.4 (83.1) | 23.8 (74.8) | 17.6 (63.7) | 11.5 (52.7) | 4.9 (40.8) | 15.4 (59.7) |
| Daily mean °C (°F) | −2.4 (27.7) | −2.0 (28.4) | 1.3 (34.3) | 7.6 (45.7) | 13.6 (56.5) | 17.7 (63.9) | 21.5 (70.7) | 22.3 (72.1) | 18.1 (64.6) | 11.7 (53.1) | 5.4 (41.7) | 0.2 (32.4) | 9.6 (49.3) |
| Mean daily minimum °C (°F) | −6.8 (19.8) | −6.9 (19.6) | −3.7 (25.3) | 1.2 (34.2) | 6.8 (44.2) | 12.5 (54.5) | 17.2 (63.0) | 17.9 (64.2) | 13.8 (56.8) | 7.0 (44.6) | 0.6 (33.1) | −3.8 (25.2) | 4.7 (40.4) |
| Record low °C (°F) | −19.7 (−3.5) | −19.4 (−2.9) | −19.7 (−3.5) | −8.6 (16.5) | −2.3 (27.9) | 2.4 (36.3) | 7.9 (46.2) | 9.2 (48.6) | 2.0 (35.6) | −3.8 (25.2) | −10.4 (13.3) | −19.2 (−2.6) | −19.7 (−3.5) |
| Average precipitation mm (inches) | 94.4 (3.72) | 63.6 (2.50) | 67.0 (2.64) | 64.0 (2.52) | 80.8 (3.18) | 116.2 (4.57) | 206.8 (8.14) | 174.3 (6.86) | 165.9 (6.53) | 128.1 (5.04) | 62.6 (2.46) | 94.5 (3.72) | 1,318.1 (51.89) |
| Average snowfall cm (inches) | 187 (74) | 153 (60) | 96 (38) | 10 (3.9) | 0 (0) | 0 (0) | 0 (0) | 0 (0) | 0 (0) | 0 (0) | 6 (2.4) | 110 (43) | 562 (221) |
| Average rainy days (≥ 1.0 mm) | 16.1 | 13.0 | 12.7 | 10.1 | 10.1 | 12.2 | 15.5 | 12.8 | 11.8 | 10.5 | 11.5 | 14.6 | 150.9 |
| Average snowy days (≥ 3 cm) | 17.3 | 15.5 | 11.4 | 1.0 | 0 | 0 | 0 | 0 | 0 | 0 | 0.6 | 8.9 | 54.7 |
| Mean monthly sunshine hours | 59.5 | 77.0 | 124.8 | 160.1 | 184.1 | 140.7 | 135.1 | 160.3 | 117.4 | 109.3 | 94.5 | 68.4 | 1,431.1 |
Source 1: JMA
Source 2: JMA
