= Ōgoe, Fukushima =

Dissolved municipality in Fukushima prefecture, Japan

Ōgoe (大越町, Ōgoe-machi) was a town located in Tamura District, Fukushima Prefecture, Japan.

On March 1, 2005, Ōgoe, along with the towns of Funehiki, Takine, and Tokiwa, and the village of Miyakoji (all from Tamura District), was merged to create the city of Tamura.

As of 2003, the town had an estimated population of 5,613 and a density of 153.11 persons per km^{2}. The total area was 36.66 km^{2}.
