= Ina, Fukushima =

Dissolved municipality in Fukushima prefecture, Japan

Ina (伊南村, Ina-mura) was a village located in Minamiaizu District, Fukushima Prefecture, Japan.

As of 2003, the village had an estimated population of 1,812 and a density of 11.83 persons per km^{2}. The total area was 153.13 km^{2}.

On March 20, 2006, Ina, was merged with town of Tajima, and the villages of Nangō and Tateiwa (all from Minamiaizu District), was merged to create the town of Minamiaizu.
