= Niitsuru, Fukushima =

Dissolved municipality in Fukushima prefecture, Japan

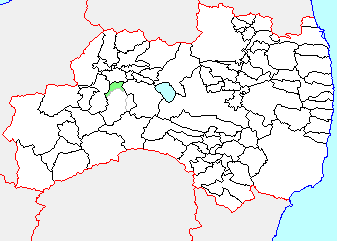
Map of Niitsuru, Fukushima

Niitsuru (新鶴村, Niitsuru-mura) was a village located in Ōnuma District, Fukushima Prefecture, Japan.

As of 2003, the village had an estimated population of 3,874 and a population density of 95.56 persons per km^{2}. The total area was 40.54 km^{2}.

On October 1, 2005, Niitsuru, along with the towns of Aizuhongō and Aizutakada (all from Ōnuma District), was merged to create the town of Aizumisato.
