= Atsushiokanō, Fukushima =

Dissolved municipality in Fukushima prefecture, Japan

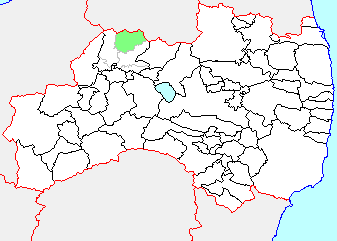
Map of Atsushiokanou, Fukushima

Atsushiokanō (熱塩加納村, Atsushiokanō-mura) was a village located in Yama District, Fukushima Prefecture, Japan.

As of 2003, the village had an estimated population of 3,446 and a density of 21.95 persons per km^{2}. The total area was 156.98 km^{2}.

On January 4, 2006, Atsushiokanō, along with the towns of Shiokawa and Yamato, and the village of Takasato (all from Yama District), was merged into the expanded city of Kitakata.
