= Uryu Iwako =

Japanese social worker

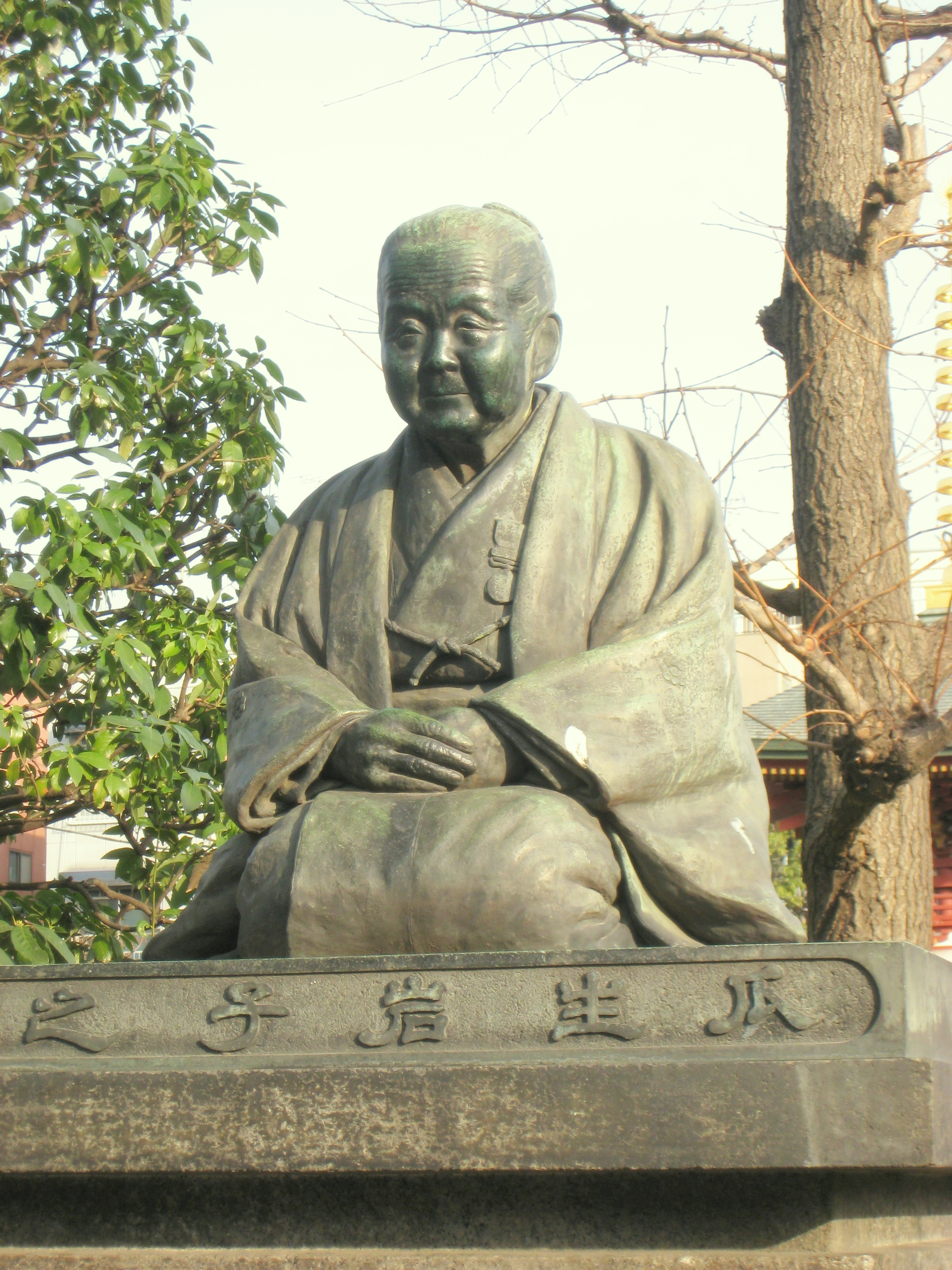
Uryū Iwako, statue in Asakusa

Uryū Iwako (瓜生 岩子, February 15, 1829 – April 19, 1897), also known as Uryū Iwa, was a Japanese social worker during the Meiji period. She established a midwifery research institute and relief facility to care for orphans and the poor, and promoted social work and girls' education.

== Life ==
Iwako was born in Kitakata, Fukushima, to a merchant family of the Aizu domain. She lost her parents at age 9, and was looked after by grandparents. She was educated by an uncle-in-law, who was a doctor.

Following the Meiji Restoration, she worked to promote girls' education, and various forms of social work. After becoming widowed at a young age, she devoted her life to helping poor and orphans, took the lead in building hospitals, and contributed to improving the living conditions of Fukushima and Tokyo's average citizens. In 1893, she founded the Fukushima Aiikuen Orphanage, which is still in operation today. She established Kitakata's Saisei Hospital and an institution devoted to midwifery research.

== Honors ==
Iwako was the first woman to receive the Medal of Honor with Blue Ribbon, which is awarded by the Japanese government to outstanding individuals in the field of social welfare or public service. A bronze statue in her honor was dedicated in Shōkōen Park, Asakusa in April 1901.
