= Tamura District, Fukushima =

District in Fukushima prefecture, Japan

Coordinates: 37.346°N 140.564°E

- List of Provinces of Japan > Tōsandō > Iwaki Province > Tamura District
- Japan > Tōhoku region > Fukushima Prefecture > Tamura District

Location of Tamura District in Fukushima Prefecture

Tamura (田村郡, Tamura-gun) is a district located in Fukushima Prefecture, Japan.

As of 2003 population data but accounting for the decreases due to the formation of the city of Tamura, the district has an estimated population of 30,658 and a density of 155 persons per km^{2}. The total area is 197.87 km^{2}.

== Towns and villages ==
- Miharu
- Ono

== Mergers ==
- On March 1, 2005, the former towns of Funehiki, Ōgoe, Takine, and Tokiwa, and the former village of Miyakoji merged, forming the city of Tamura.
