= Miyagawa Dam (Fukushima) =

Dam in Fukushima Prefecture, Japan

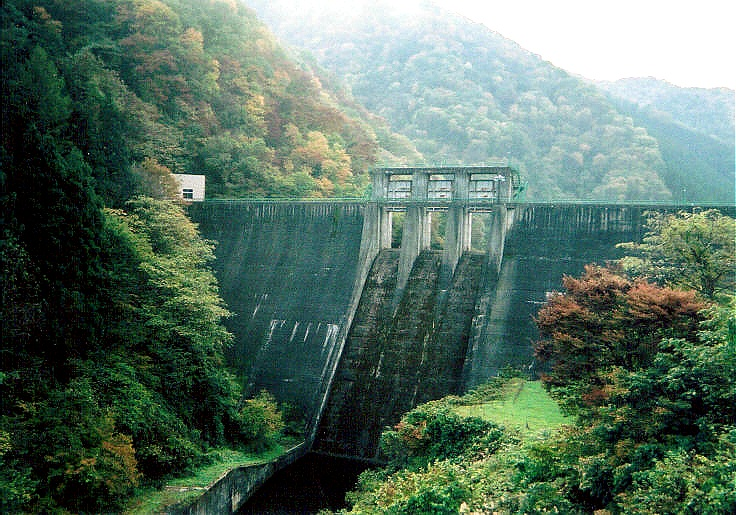
- Interactive map of Miyagawa Dam
- Location: Fukushima Prefecture, Japan.
- Coordinates: 37.3757°N 139.7879°E

Dam and spillways
- Impounds: Agano River

Miyagawa Dam is a dam in the Fukushima Prefecture of Japan, completed in 1962.
