= Aizutakada, Fukushima =

Dissolved municipality in Fukushima prefecture, Japan

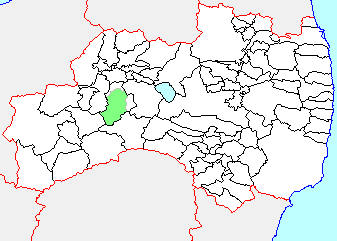
Map of Aizutakada, Fukushima

Aizutakada (会津高田町, Aizutakada-machi) was a town located in Ōnuma District, Fukushima Prefecture, Japan.

As of 2003, the town had an estimated population of 15,024 and a population density of 76.78 persons per km^{2}. The total area was 195.67 km^{2}.

On October 1, 2005, Aizutakada, along with the town of Aizuhongō, and the village of Niitsuru (all from Ōnuma District), was merged to create the town of Aizumisato.
