= Minamiaizu =

Minamiaizu 南会津町
- Town
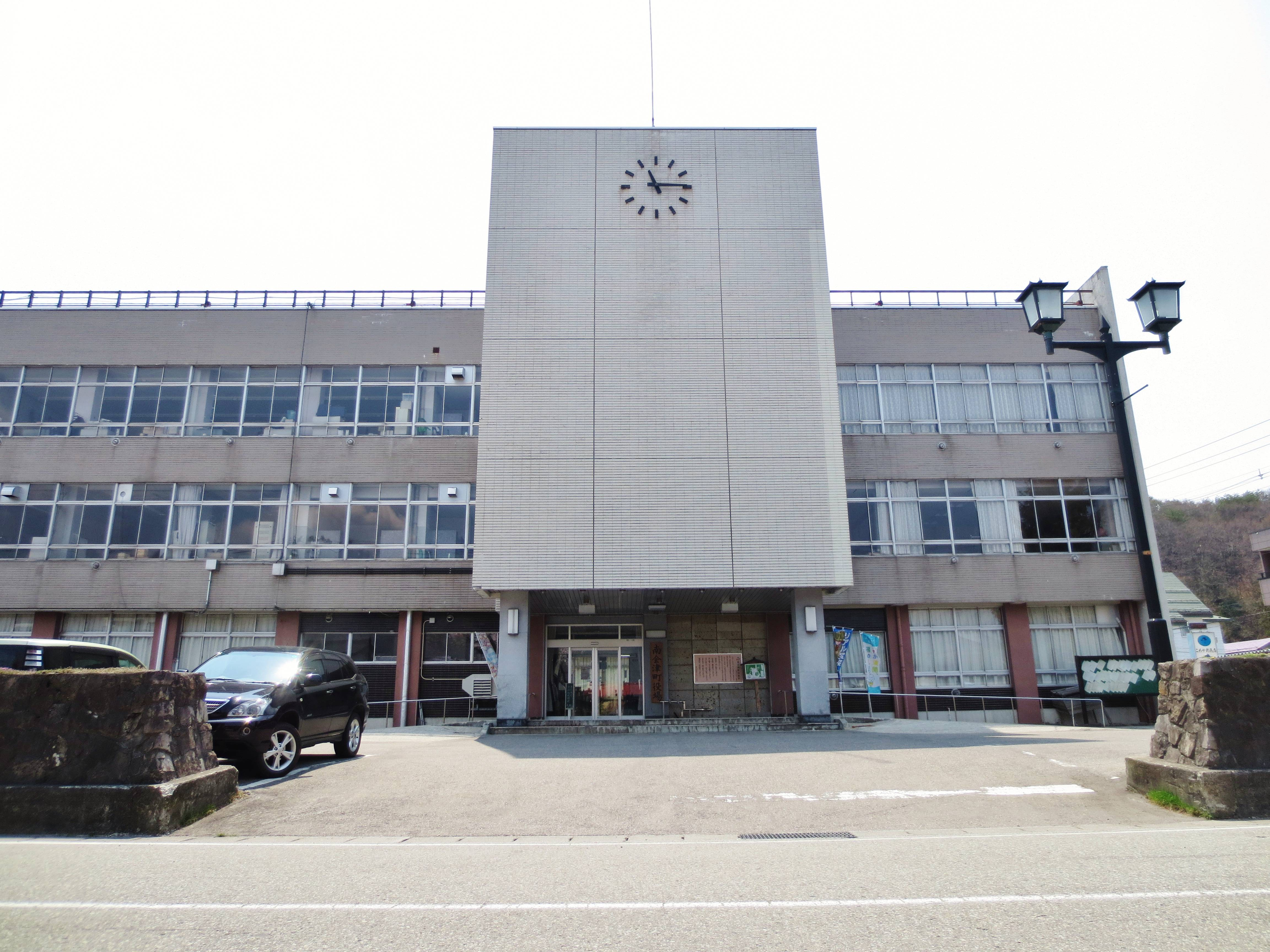
- Minamiaizu Town Hall

- Flag Seal

- Location of Minamiaizu in Fukushima Prefecture

- Coordinates: 37°12′1.4″N 139°46′23.6″E
- Country: Japan
- Region: Tōhoku
- Prefecture: Fukushima
- District: Minamiaizu

Area
  - Total: 886.47 km^{2} (342.27 sq mi)

Population (April 2020)
  - Total: 15,158
  - Density: 17.099/km^{2} (44.287/sq mi)
- Time zone: UTC+9 (Japan Standard Time)
- Phone number: 0241-62-6100
- Address: 3531-1 Tajima Gohara, Minamiaizu-machi, MInamiaizu-gun, Fukushima-ken 967-0004
- Climate: Dfa
- Website: Official website
- Symbols
- Bird: Japanese bush warbler
- Flower: Rhododendron kaempferi
- Tree: Fagus crenata

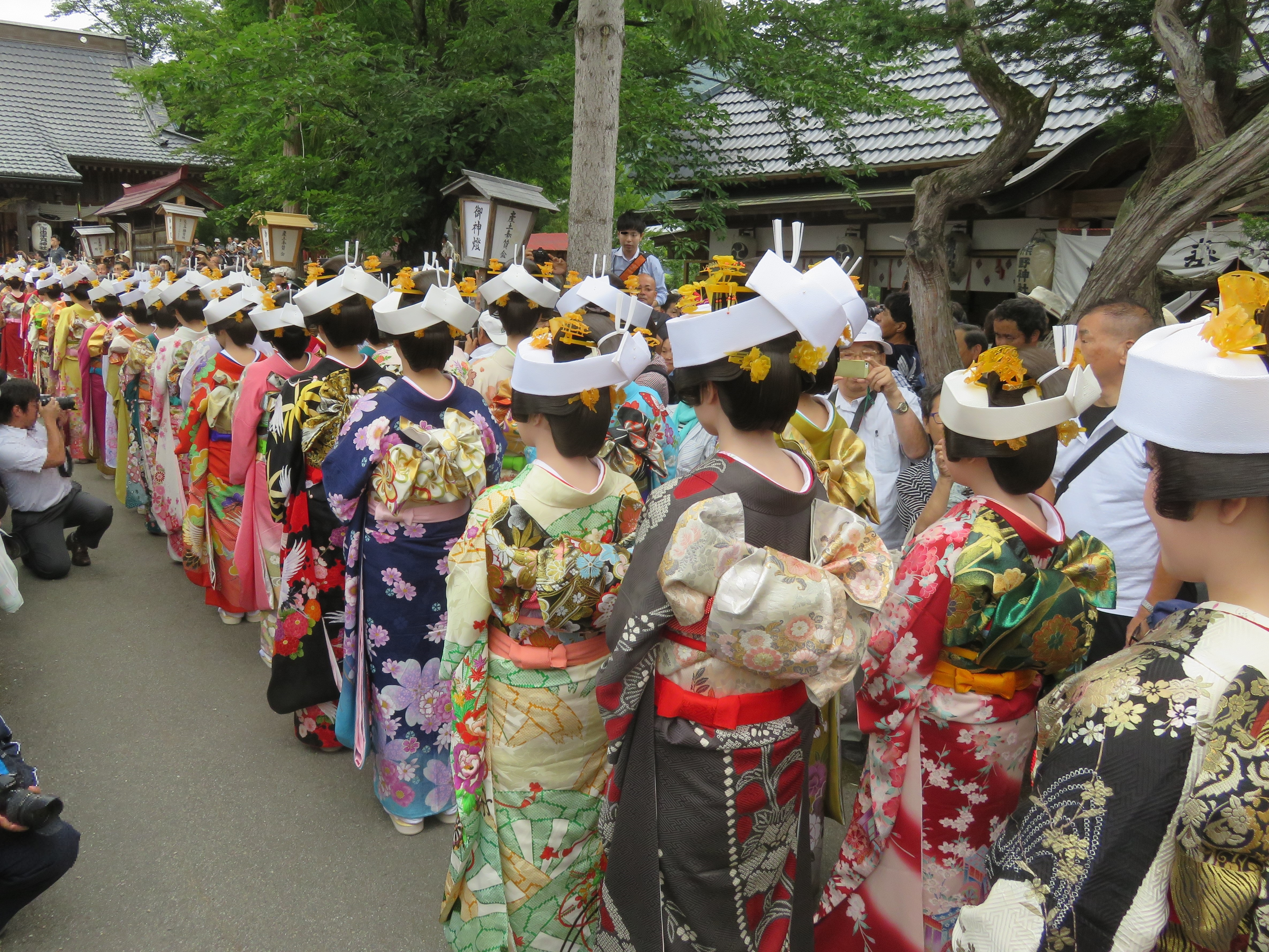
Aizu-Tajima Gionsai Festival

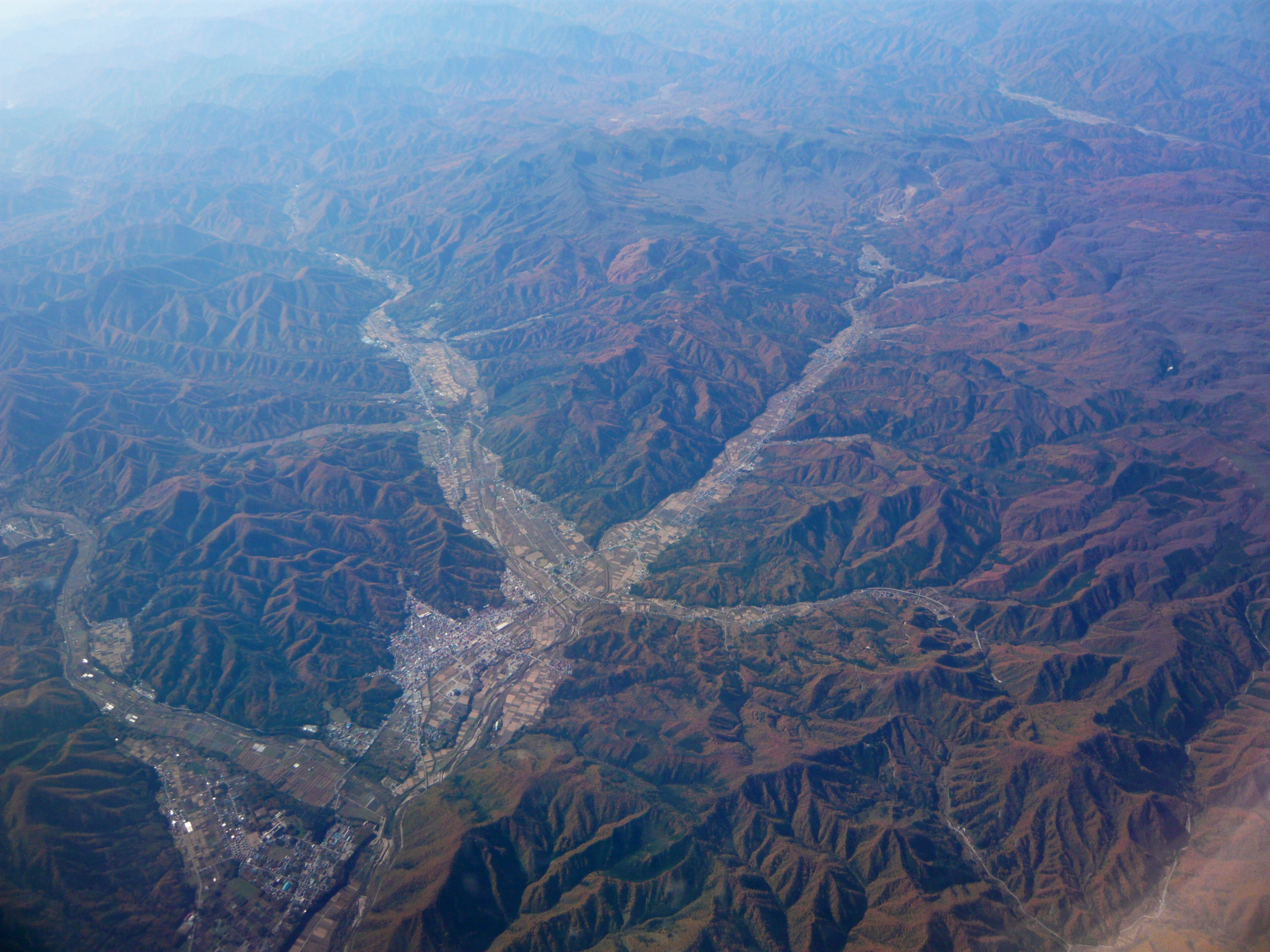
Aerial view of Minamiaizu

Minamiaizu (南会津町, Minamiaizu-machi) is a town located in Fukushima Prefecture, Japan. As of 1 April 2020, the town had an estimated population of 15,158 in 6,575 households, and a population density of 17 persons per km^{2}. The total area of the town was 886.52 square kilometres (342.29 sq mi).

== Geography ==
Minamiaizu is located in the mountainous southern portion of the Aizu region of Fukushima Prefecture, bordered Tochigi Prefecture to the south.

- Mountains : Onsabi Mountains, Nasudake, Mount Nanatsugadake
- Rivers : Okawa, Ina River

=== Neighboring municipalities ===
- Fukushima Prefecture
  - Hinoemata
  - Shimogō
  - Shōwa
  - Tadami
- Tochigi Prefecture
  - Nasushiobara
  - Nikkō

=== Climate ===
Minamiaizu has a humid continental climate (Köppen Dfa) characterized by warm summers and cold winters with heavy snowfall. The average annual temperature in Minamiaizu is 8.8 °C. The average annual rainfall is 1642 mm with September as the wettest month. The temperatures are highest on average in August, at around 24.8 °C, and lowest in January, at around -3.4 °C.

Climate data for Tajima, Minamiaizu (1991−2020 normals, extremes 1976−present)
Month	Jan	Feb	Mar	Apr	May	Jun	Jul	Aug	Sep	Oct	Nov	Dec	Year
Record high °C (°F)	13.5 (56.3)	16.2 (61.2)	23.7 (74.7)	28.7 (83.7)	31.4 (88.5)	33.4 (92.1)	35.0 (95.0)	34.6 (94.3)	32.4 (90.3)	27.7 (81.9)	24.0 (75.2)	18.4 (65.1)	35.0 (95.0)
Mean daily maximum °C (°F)	1.9 (35.4)	3.0 (37.4)	7.1 (44.8)	14.5 (58.1)	20.7 (69.3)	23.8 (74.8)	27.2 (81.0)	28.4 (83.1)	23.8 (74.8)	17.6 (63.7)	11.5 (52.7)	4.9 (40.8)	15.4 (59.7)
Daily mean °C (°F)	−2.4 (27.7)	−2.0 (28.4)	1.3 (34.3)	7.6 (45.7)	13.6 (56.5)	17.7 (63.9)	21.5 (70.7)	22.3 (72.1)	18.1 (64.6)	11.7 (53.1)	5.4 (41.7)	0.2 (32.4)	9.6 (49.3)
Mean daily minimum °C (°F)	−6.8 (19.8)	−6.9 (19.6)	−3.7 (25.3)	1.2 (34.2)	6.8 (44.2)	12.5 (54.5)	17.2 (63.0)	17.9 (64.2)	13.8 (56.8)	7.0 (44.6)	0.6 (33.1)	−3.8 (25.2)	4.7 (40.4)
Record low °C (°F)	−19.7 (−3.5)	−19.4 (−2.9)	−19.7 (−3.5)	−8.6 (16.5)	−2.3 (27.9)	2.4 (36.3)	7.9 (46.2)	9.2 (48.6)	2.0 (35.6)	−3.8 (25.2)	−10.4 (13.3)	−19.2 (−2.6)	−19.7 (−3.5)
Average precipitation mm (inches)	94.4 (3.72)	63.6 (2.50)	67.0 (2.64)	64.0 (2.52)	80.8 (3.18)	116.2 (4.57)	206.8 (8.14)	174.3 (6.86)	165.9 (6.53)	128.1 (5.04)	62.6 (2.46)	94.5 (3.72)	1,318.1 (51.89)
Average snowfall cm (inches)	187 (74)	153 (60)	96 (38)	10 (3.9)	0 (0)	0 (0)	0 (0)	0 (0)	0 (0)	0 (0)	6 (2.4)	110 (43)	562 (221)
Average rainy days (≥ 1.0 mm)	16.1	13.0	12.7	10.1	10.1	12.2	15.5	12.8	11.8	10.5	11.5	14.6	150.9
Average snowy days (≥ 3 cm)	17.3	15.5	11.4	1.0	0	0	0	0	0	0	0.6	8.9	54.7
Mean monthly sunshine hours	59.5	77.0	124.8	160.1	184.1	140.7	135.1	160.3	117.4	109.3	94.5	68.4	1,431.1
Source 1: JMA
Source 2: JMA

Climate data for Nangō, Minamiaizu (1991−2020 normals, extremes 1976−present)
Month	Jan	Feb	Mar	Apr	May	Jun	Jul	Aug	Sep	Oct	Nov	Dec	Year
Record high °C (°F)	11.6 (52.9)	15.1 (59.2)	20.1 (68.2)	28.6 (83.5)	32.7 (90.9)	33.1 (91.6)	35.1 (95.2)	36.6 (97.9)	34.1 (93.4)	29.7 (85.5)	24.1 (75.4)	19.2 (66.6)	36.6 (97.9)
Mean daily maximum °C (°F)	1.2 (34.2)	2.1 (35.8)	6.0 (42.8)	13.7 (56.7)	20.7 (69.3)	24.0 (75.2)	27.3 (81.1)	28.8 (83.8)	24.4 (75.9)	18.1 (64.6)	11.4 (52.5)	4.3 (39.7)	15.2 (59.3)
Daily mean °C (°F)	−2.2 (28.0)	−1.9 (28.6)	1.1 (34.0)	7.1 (44.8)	13.9 (57.0)	18.3 (64.9)	22.0 (71.6)	22.9 (73.2)	18.7 (65.7)	12.2 (54.0)	5.7 (42.3)	0.4 (32.7)	9.9 (49.7)
Mean daily minimum °C (°F)	−5.7 (21.7)	−6.1 (21.0)	−3.2 (26.2)	1.5 (34.7)	7.4 (45.3)	13.3 (55.9)	17.8 (64.0)	18.5 (65.3)	14.4 (57.9)	7.7 (45.9)	1.4 (34.5)	−2.9 (26.8)	5.3 (41.6)
Record low °C (°F)	−18.0 (−0.4)	−17.2 (1.0)	−16.5 (2.3)	−7.3 (18.9)	−1.1 (30.0)	3.8 (38.8)	9.3 (48.7)	9.1 (48.4)	3.0 (37.4)	−2.9 (26.8)	−11.2 (11.8)	−15.0 (5.0)	−18.0 (−0.4)
Average precipitation mm (inches)	126.8 (4.99)	79.1 (3.11)	76.0 (2.99)	65.7 (2.59)	76.6 (3.02)	117.1 (4.61)	225.1 (8.86)	169.6 (6.68)	139.4 (5.49)	134.7 (5.30)	119.7 (4.71)	161.6 (6.36)	1,492.1 (58.74)
Average snowfall cm (inches)	306 (120)	249 (98)	175 (69)	42 (17)	0 (0)	0 (0)	0 (0)	0 (0)	0 (0)	0 (0)	16 (6.3)	211 (83)	1,010 (398)
Average rainy days (≥ 1.0 mm)	20.6	16.2	15.7	11.6	11.3	13.0	15.6	13.2	13.4	13.9	16.0	20.0	180.5
Average snowy days (≥ 3 cm)	23.4	20.9	20.1	5.8	0	0	0	0	0	0	1.5	13.5	85.2
Mean monthly sunshine hours	55.1	75.1	126.8	173.4	196.2	154.3	148.0	186.8	136.6	123.1	99.1	62.5	1,540.6
Source 1: JMA
Source 2: JMA

== Demographics ==
Per Japanese census data, the population of Minamiaizu peaked I the 1950s and has declined steadily over the past 60 years. It is now less than it was a century ago.

Historical population
Year	Pop.	±%
1920	20,204	—
1930	23,020	+13.9%
1940	28,057	+21.9%
1950	31,946	+13.9%
1960	34,152	+6.9%
1970	26,813	−21.5%
1980	24,119	−10.0%
1990	22,548	−6.5%
2000	21,095	−6.4%
2010	17,850	−15.4%
2020	14,451	−19.0%

== History ==
The area of present-day Minamiaizu was part of ancient Mutsu Province and formed part of the holdings of Aizu Domain during the Edo period. After the Meiji Restoration, it was organized as part of Minamiaizu District in Fukushima Prefecture. With the establishment of the modern municipalities system on April 1, 1889, the town of Tajima and the villages of Ina, Nangō, and Tateiwa were established with the creation of the modern municipalities system. These four municipalities merged on March 20, 2006, to form the town of Minamiaizu.

== Economy ==
The economy of Minamiaizu is primarily agricultural. Rice, tomatoes and asparagus are the main crops.

== Education ==
The town has seven public elementary schools and four public junior high school operated by the town government. The town has two public high schools operated by the Fukushima Prefectural Board of Education.

- Fukushima Prefectural Tajima High School
- Fukushima Prefectural Minamiaizu High School

== Transportation ==
=== Railway ===
Aizu Railway – Aizu Line

- Aizu-Nagano - Tajimakōkōmae - Aizu-Tajima - Nakaarai - Aizu-Arakai - Aizu-Sanson-Dōjō - Nanatsugatake-Tozanguchi - Aizukōgen-Ozeguchi

■ Yagan Railway – Aizu Kinugawa Line

- Aizukōgen-Ozeguchi

=== Highway ===
- National Route 121
- National Route 289
- National Route 352
- National Route 400
- National Route 401

== Local attractions ==
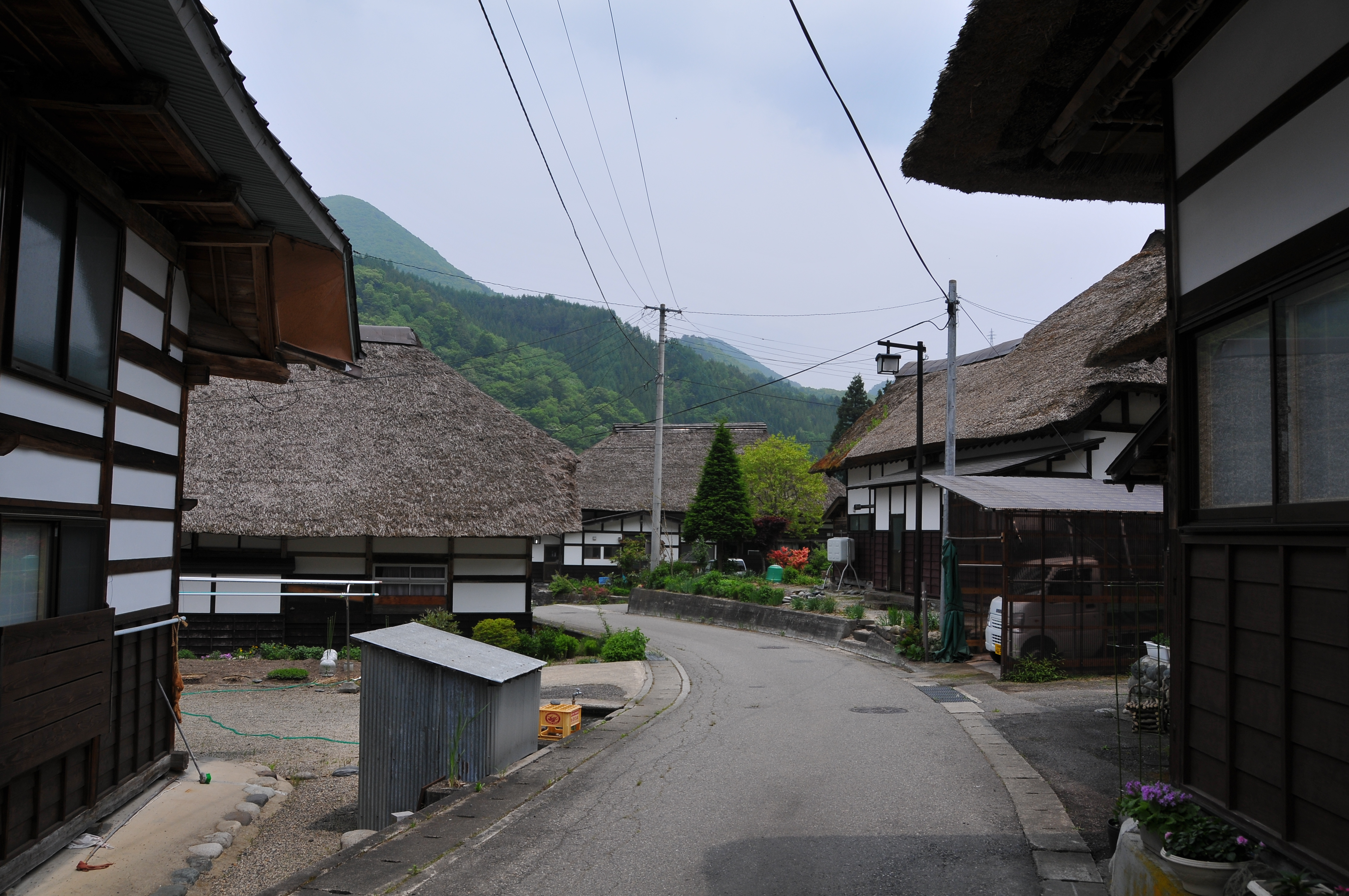
Maezawa Magariya Village

- Aizu-Tajima Gionsai festival
- Hosoi Residence Museum
- Komado Wetlands
- Maezawa Magariya Village (Museum of "L" Shaped Old Folk Houses)
- Okuaizu Museum
- Tashiroyama Wetlands
- Yunohana Onsen

== Noted people from Minamiaizu ==
- Kozo Watanabe, politician
