= Yama District, Fukushima =

District in Fukushima prefecture, Japan

Coordinates: 37.652°N 140.040°E

Location of Yama District in Fukushima Prefecture

Yama (Japanese: 耶麻郡, Yama-gun) is a district located in Fukushima Prefecture, Japan.

As of 2008, the district has an estimated population of 31,175 and a density of 31.6 persons per km^{2}. The total area is 986.763 km^{2}.

== Towns and villages ==
- Bandai
- Inawashiro
- Nishiaizu
- Kitashiobara

== Merger ==
- On January 4, 2006, the towns of Shiokawa and Yamato, and the villages of Atsushiokanō and Takasato merged into the city of Kitakata.

== See also ==
- List of Provinces of Japan > Tōsandō > Iwashiro Province > Yama District
- Japan > Tōhoku region > Fukushima Prefecture > Yama District
