= Kitakata =

Kitakata 喜多方市
- City
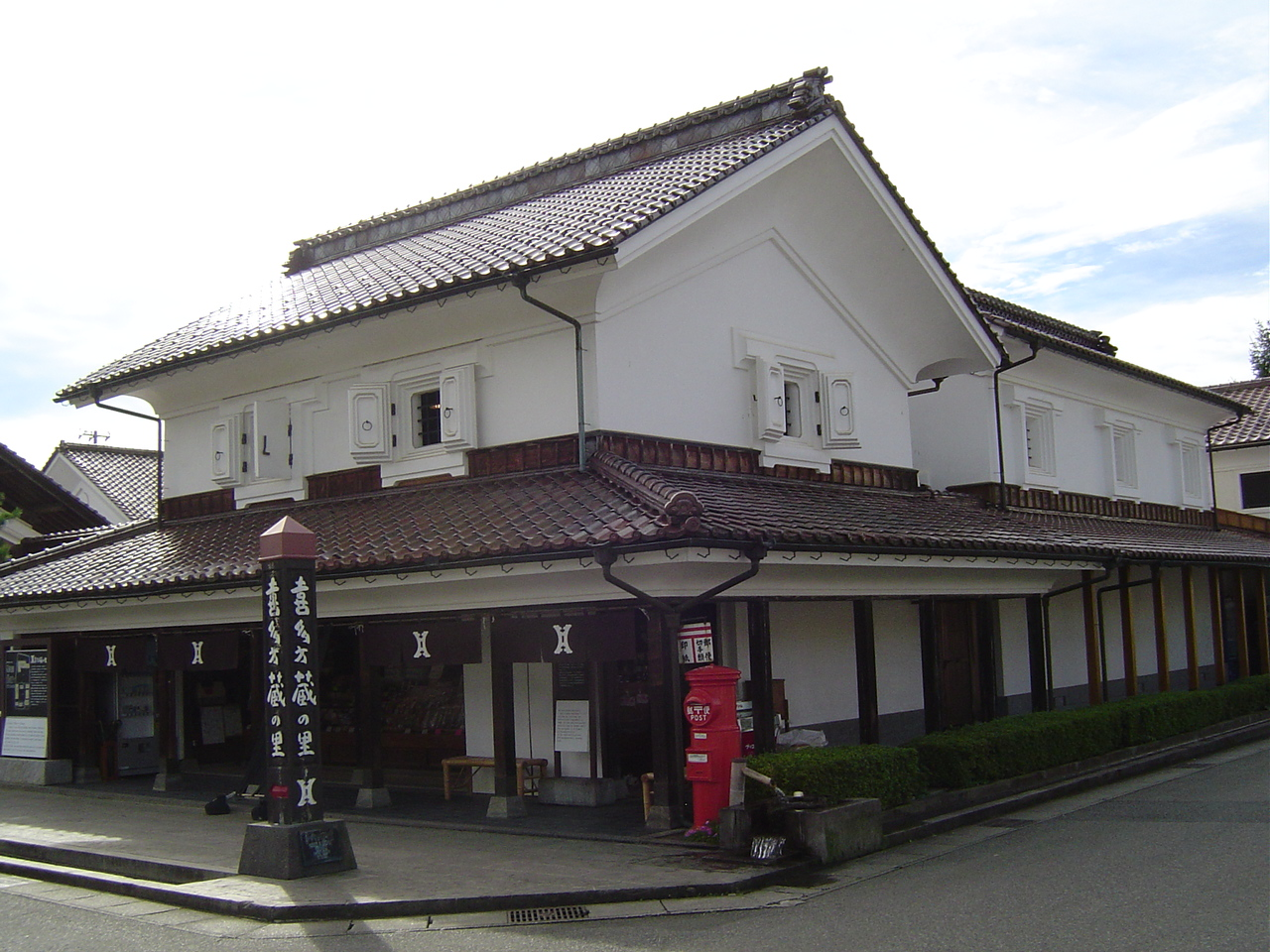
- old sake kura in Kitakata

- Flag Seal

- Location of Kitakata in Fukushima Prefecture

- Coordinates: 37°39′4.1″N 139°52′29.1″E
- Country: Japan
- Region: Tōhoku
- Prefecture: Fukushima

Government
  - Mayor: Chuichi Endo

Area
  - Total: 554.63 km^{2} (214.14 sq mi)

Population (March 2020)
  - Total: 46,269
  - Density: 83.423/km^{2} (216.07/sq mi)
- Time zone: UTC+9 (Japan Standard Time)
- Symbols
  - Tree: Cryptomeria
  - Flower: Himesayuri (Lilium rubellum)
  - Bird: Wagtail
  - Fish: Three-spined stickleback
  - Insect: Firefly
- Phone number: 0241-24-5211
- Address: 7244-2 Oshimizuhigashi, Kitakata-shi, Fukushima-ken 966-8601
- Climate: Cfa/Dfa
- Website: Official website

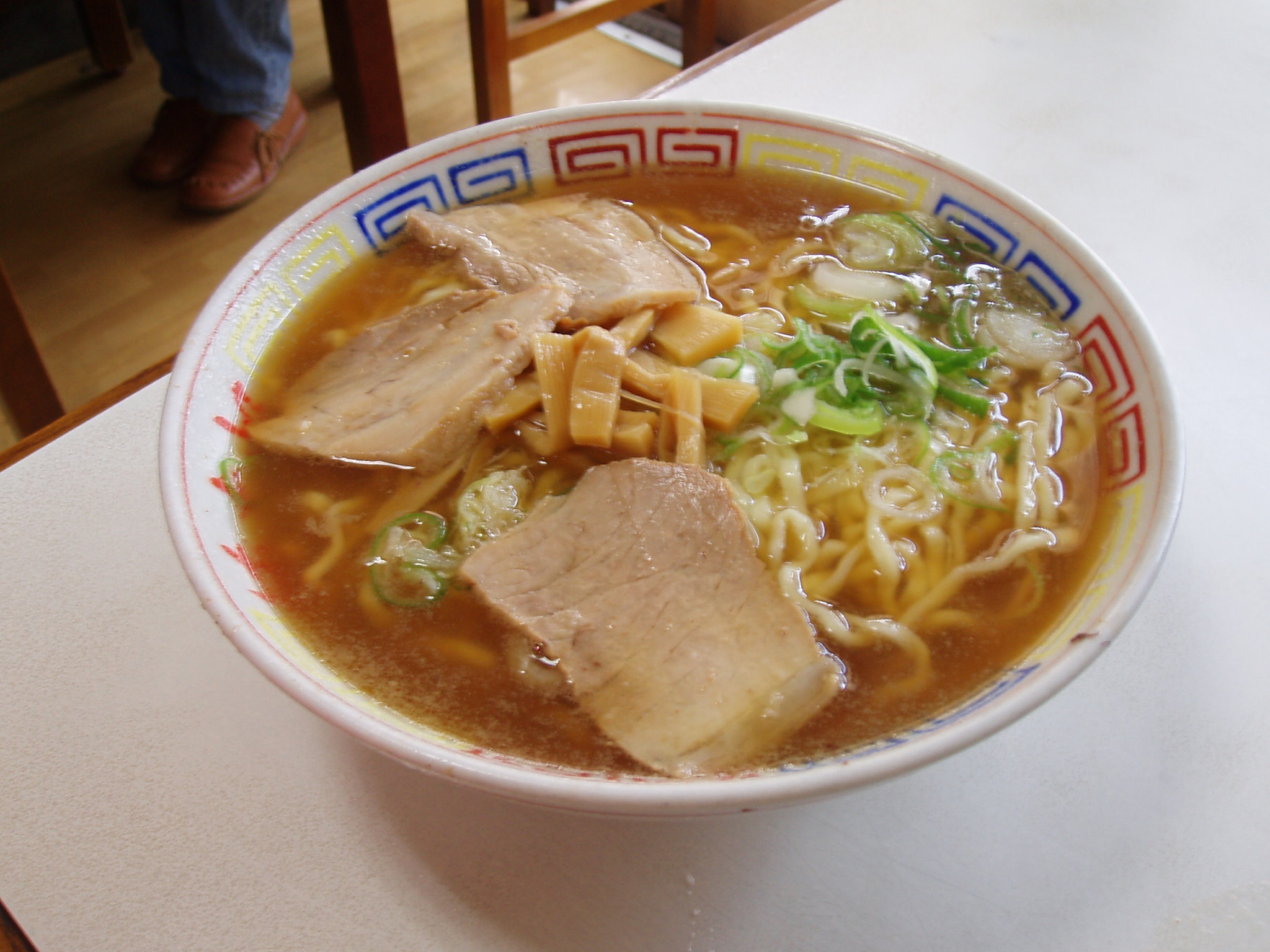
Kitakata ramen

Kitakata (喜多方市, Kitakata-shi) is a city located in Fukushima Prefecture, Japan. As of 1 March 2020, the city had an estimated population of 46,269 in 16,769 households, and a population density of 83 persons per km^{2}. The total area of the city was 554.63 square kilometres (214.14 sq mi). Kitakata was once written '北方', which meant 'northern place'.

== Geography ==
Kitakata is located at the far northern Aizu region of Fukushima Prefecture, bordered by Yamagata Prefecture to the north and Niigata Prefecture to the west.

- Mountains: Mount Bandai, Mount Iide
- Rivers: Aga River, Tadami River

=== Neighboring municipalities ===
Fukushima Prefecture

- Aizubange
- Aizuwakamatsu
- Bandai
- Kitashiobara
- Nishiaizu
- Yugawa

Niigata Prefecture

- Aga
- Shibata

Yamagata Prefecture

- Iide
- Oguni
- Yonezawa

== Climate ==
Kitakata has a humid continental climate (Köppen Dfb) characterized by warm summers and cold winters with heavy snowfall. The average annual temperature in Kitakata is 11.6 °C. The average annual rainfall is 1426 mm with September as the wettest month. The temperatures are highest on average in August, at around 25.5 °C, and lowest in January, at around -1.1 °C.

Climate data for Kitakata (elevation 212 m, 1991–2020 normals, extremes 1976–present)
Month	Jan	Feb	Mar	Apr	May	Jun	Jul	Aug	Sep	Oct	Nov	Dec	Year
Record high °C (°F)	12.7 (54.9)	19.6 (67.3)	23.3 (73.9)	30.3 (86.5)	35.1 (95.2)	35.5 (95.9)	38.4 (101.1)	38.4 (101.1)	36.2 (97.2)	30.9 (87.6)	25.2 (77.4)	19.7 (67.5)	38.4 (101.1)
Mean daily maximum °C (°F)	2.5 (36.5)	3.6 (38.5)	8.4 (47.1)	16.3 (61.3)	22.5 (72.5)	25.8 (78.4)	28.9 (84.0)	30.5 (86.9)	26.0 (78.8)	19.5 (67.1)	12.1 (53.8)	5.3 (41.5)	16.8 (62.2)
Daily mean °C (°F)	−1.0 (30.2)	−0.7 (30.7)	3.0 (37.4)	9.5 (49.1)	15.7 (60.3)	20.1 (68.2)	23.5 (74.3)	24.5 (76.1)	20.1 (68.2)	13.5 (56.3)	6.9 (44.4)	1.7 (35.1)	11.4 (52.5)
Mean daily minimum °C (°F)	−5.1 (22.8)	−5.2 (22.6)	−1.9 (28.6)	3.2 (37.8)	9.4 (48.9)	15.3 (59.5)	19.3 (66.7)	19.9 (67.8)	15.5 (59.9)	8.7 (47.7)	2.5 (36.5)	−1.7 (28.9)	6.6 (43.9)
Record low °C (°F)	−18.1 (−0.6)	−16.4 (2.5)	−14.0 (6.8)	−6.9 (19.6)	−0.1 (31.8)	5.6 (42.1)	10.6 (51.1)	10.6 (51.1)	4.7 (40.5)	−1.7 (28.9)	−7.5 (18.5)	−12.1 (10.2)	−18.1 (−0.6)
Average precipitation mm (inches)	149.3 (5.88)	108.9 (4.29)	107.2 (4.22)	85.2 (3.35)	84.5 (3.33)	124.3 (4.89)	222.1 (8.74)	168.0 (6.61)	122.4 (4.82)	115.4 (4.54)	113.6 (4.47)	161.2 (6.35)	1,561.9 (61.49)
Average precipitation days (≥ 1.0 mm)	19.3	16.2	16.1	12.2	10.5	11.3	14.4	11.6	11.3	11.7	14.3	19.3	168.2
Mean monthly sunshine hours	80.8	99.6	145.7	176.7	204.0	166.4	153.5	196.9	142.0	134.0	99.1	70.6	1,669.2
Source: Japan Meteorological Agency (1991–2020 normals, extremes 1976–present)

== Demographics ==
Per Japanese census data, the population of Kitakata has declined over the past 60 years.

Historical population
Year	Pop.	±%
1960	70,083	—
1970	64,177	−8.4%
1980	60,456	−5.8%
1990	59,817	−1.1%
2000	58,571	−2.1%
2010	52,373	−10.6%
2020	44,760	−14.5%

== History ==
The area of present-day Kitakata was part of ancient Mutsu Province, and formed part of the holdings of Aizu Domain during the Edo period. The town developed as a local administrative center and market town, noted for its lacquerware and brewing of sake. After the Meiji Restoration, it was organized as part of Yama District, Fukushima Prefecture. The town of Kitakami was created with the establishment of the modern municipalities system on April 1, 1889.

In 1882, more than 3,000 peasants gathered at the Danjo-ga-hara Field in Shiokawa and then marched on the Kitakata Police Station to rebel against the oppression of the prefectural government. Known as the Kitakata Incident of 1882, it was the first public expression of the Freedom and People's Rights Movement in the Tohoku area.

Kitakata Town was raised to city status on March 31, 1954, after merging with Matsuyama village, Kamisammiya village, Iwasuki village, Sekishiba village, Kumakura village, Keitoku village, and Shiokawa village. On January 4, 2006, the towns of Shiokawa and Yamato, and the villages of Atsushiokanō and Takasato (all from Yama District) were merged into Kitakata.

== Government ==
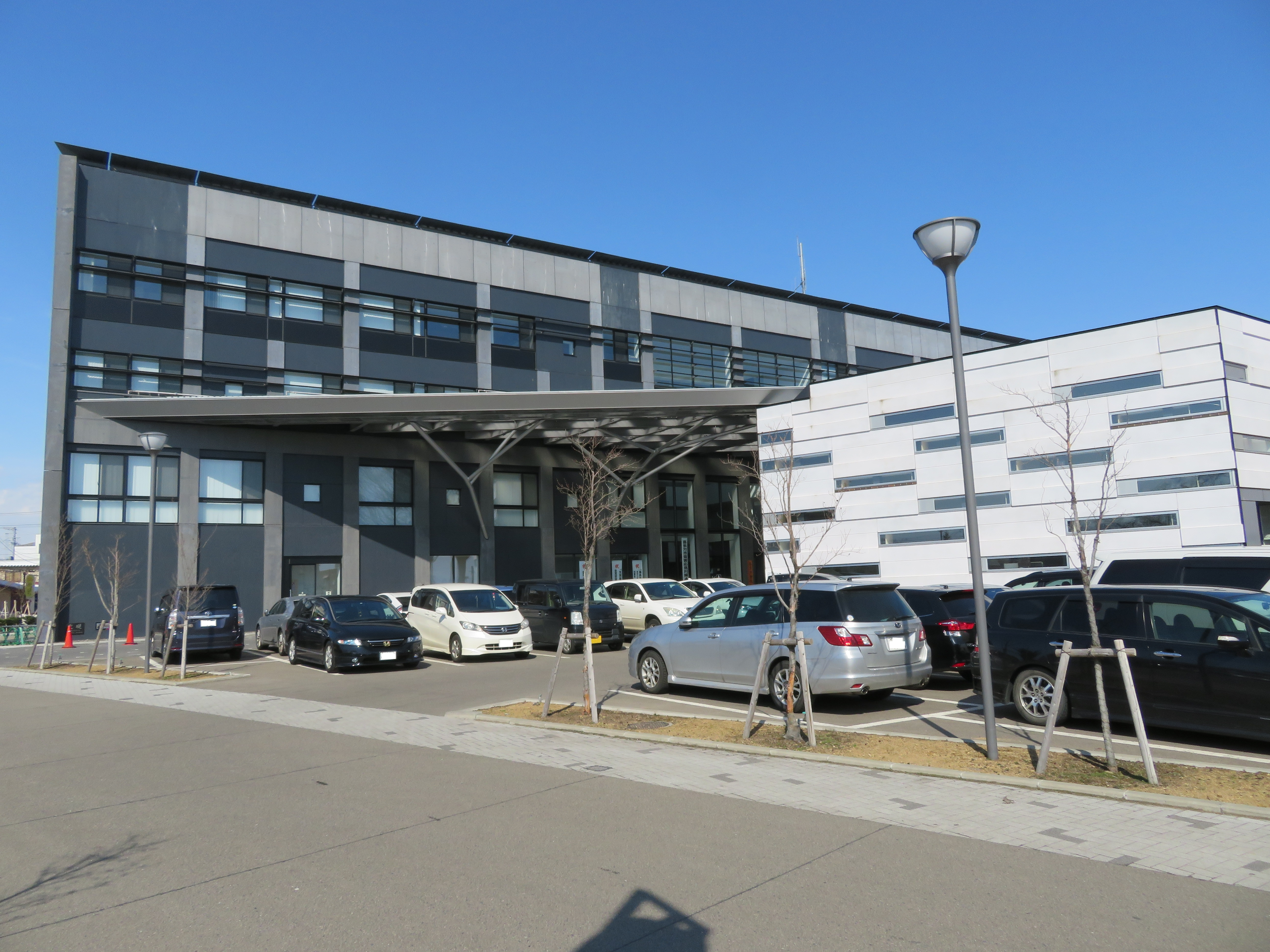
Kitakata City Hall

Kitakata has a mayor-council form of government with a directly elected mayor and a unicameral city legislature of 25 members. Kitakata, together with Yama District contribute two members to the Fukushima Prefectural Assembly. In terms of national politics, the city is part of Fukushima 4th district of the lower house of the Diet of Japan.

== Economy ==
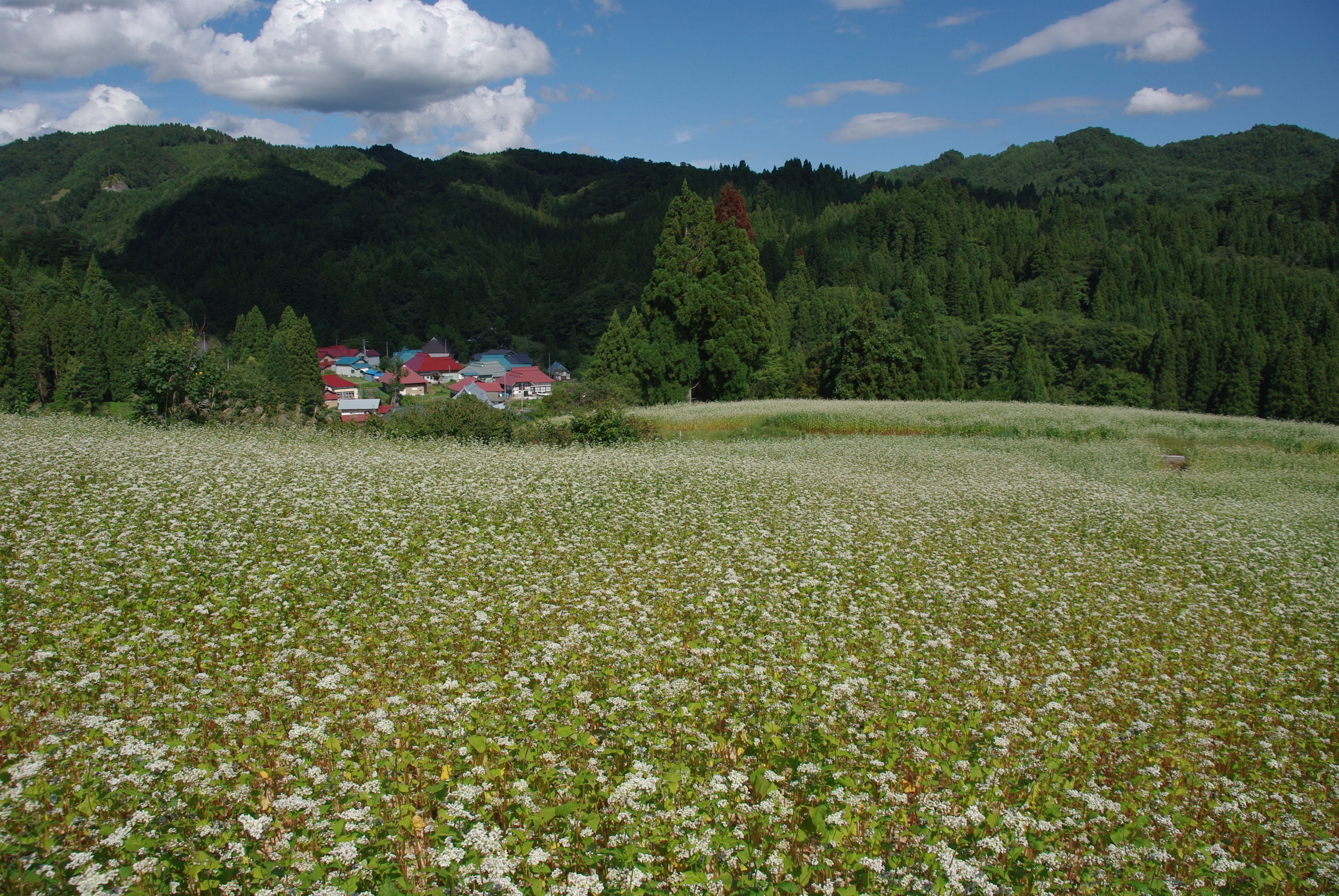
Buckwheat field in Yamato district

Kitakata is a local commercial center. Agricultural products include rice and hops. The area is traditionally noted for sake brewing and lacquerware. Modern industries include aluminum smelting.

== Education ==
Kitakata has 17 public elementary school and seven public junior high schools operated by the city government, and four public high schools operated by the Fukushima Prefectural Board of Education. The prefecture also operates a vocational training school.

== Transportation ==
=== Railway ===
JR East – Ban'etsu West Line

- Shiokawa - Ubadō - Aizu-Toyokawa - Kitakata - Yamato - Ogino

=== Highway ===
- National Route 121
- National Route 459

== Local attractions ==
- Kitakata is well known for its distinctive ramen. The area within its former city boundaries has the highest per-capita number of ramen establishments in Japan. Ramen has such prominence in the region that locally, the word soba usually refers to ramen, and not to actual soba which is referred to as nihon soba ("Japanese soba"). Kitakata's ramen consists of rather thick, flat, curly noodles served in a pork and niboshi broth.
- The city has over 2,600 kura storehouses which are now typically used as sake breweries, living quarters and workshops.
- Aizushingū Castle ruins, National Historic Site
- Furuyashiki Site, National Historic Site

== Sister cities ==
- Baoji, Shaanxi, China
- Wilsonville, Oregon, United States of America

== Noted people from Kitakata ==
- Uryu Iwako, social worker

== See also ==
- Umbilical Cord (Fukushima), Hiking trail and a panhandle is located in the city
