= Takine, Fukushima =

Dissolved municipality in Fukushima prefecture, Japan

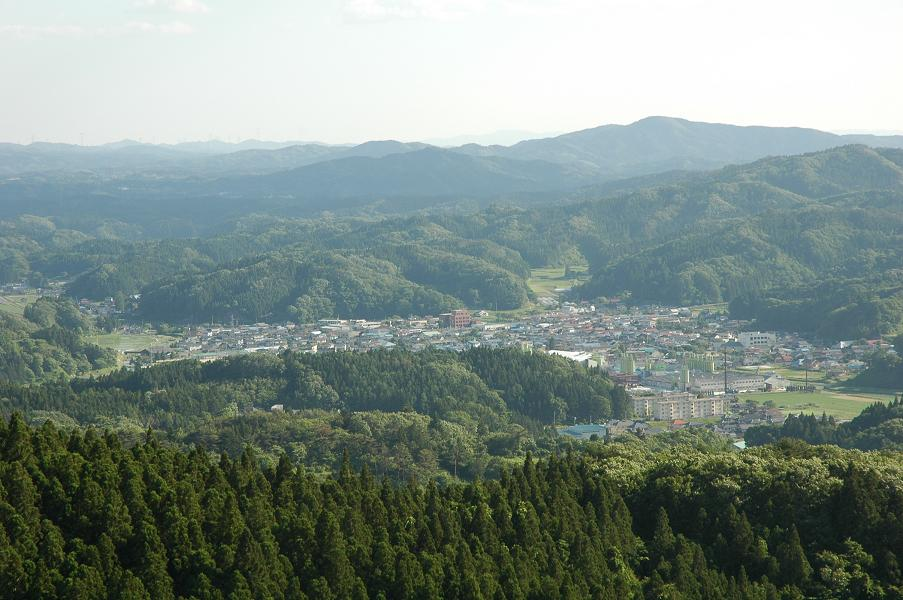
Takine-machi

Takine (滝根町, Takine-machi) was a town located in Tamura District, Fukushima Prefecture, Japan.

On March 1, 2005, Takine, along with the towns of Funehiki, Ōgoe, and Tokiwa, and the village of Miyakoji (all from Tamura District), was merged to create the city of Tamura.

As of 2003, the town had an estimated population of 5,410 and a density of 106.71 persons per km^{2}. The total area was 50.70 km^{2}.
