= Takasato, Fukushima =

Dissolved municipality in Fukushima prefecture, Japan

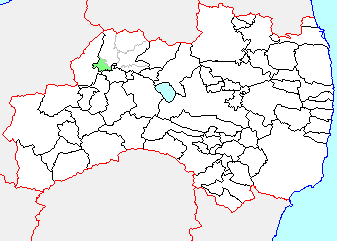
Map of Takasato, Fukushima

Takasato (高郷村, Takasato-mura) was a village in Yama District, Fukushima Prefecture, Japan.

As of 2003, the village had an estimated population of 2,442 and a density of 54.46 persons per km^{2}. The total area was 44.84 km^{2}.

On January 4, 2006, Takasato, along with the towns of Shiokawa and Yamato, and the village of Atsushiokanō (all from Yama District), was merged into the expanded city of Kitakata.
