= Kitaaizu, Fukushima =

Dissolved municipality in Japan

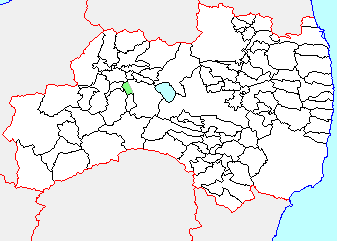
Map of Kitaaizu, Fukushima

Kitaaizu (北会津村, Kitaaizu-mura) was a village located in the former Kitaaizu District, Fukushima Prefecture, Japan.

On November 1, 2004, Kitaaizu was merged into the expanded city of Aizuwakamatsu and no longer exists as an independent municipality.

As of 2003, the village had an estimated population of 7,603 and a density of 269.80 persons per km^{2}. The total area was 28.18 km^{2}.
