= Shiokawa, Fukushima =

Dissolved municipality in Fukushima prefecture, Japan

Coordinates: 37.583°N 139.883°E

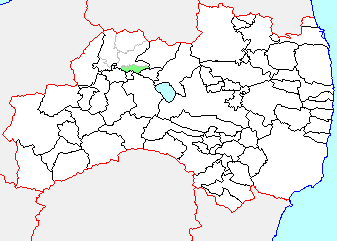
Map of Shiokawa, Fukushima

Shiokawa (塩川町, Shiokawa-machi) was a town located in Yama District, Fukushima Prefecture, Japan.

== Population ==
As of 2003, the town had an estimated population of 10,457 and a density of 226.15 persons per km^{2}. The total area was 46.24 km^{2}.

== History ==
On January 4, 2006, Shiokawa, along with the town of Yamato, and the villages of Atsushiokanō and Takasato (all from Yama District), was merged into the expanded city of Kitakata.

== See also ==
- Shiokawa Station
