= Kitaaizu District, Fukushima =

Former district in Japan

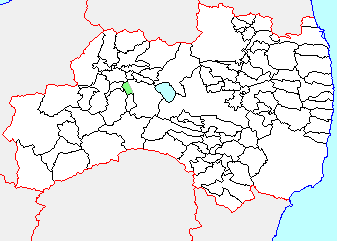
Kitaaizu District in Fukushima Prefecture

Kitaaizu (北会津郡, Kitaaizu-gun) was a district located in Fukushima Prefecture, Japan.

On November 1, 2004, the village of Kitaaizu was merged into the expanded city of Aizuwakamatsu, as a result of which the village and district dissolved.

As of 2003, the district had an estimated population of 7,603 and a density of 269.80 persons per km^{2}. The total area was 28.18 km^{2}.

== Towns and villages ==
- Kitaaizu (now part of Aizuwakamatsu)
