= Minamiaizu District, Fukushima =

District in Fukushima prefecture, Japan

Coordinates: 37.156°N 139.44°E

Location of Minamiaizu District in Fukushima Prefecture

Minamiaizu (南会津郡, Minamiaizu-gun) is a district located in Fukushima Prefecture, Japan. It makes up the southern third of the Aizu region in western Fukushima Prefecture.

As of 2003, the district has an estimated population of 33,533 and a density of 14.32 persons per km^{2}. The total area is 2,341.64 km^{2}. It is the least populated part of Aizu.

== Towns and villages ==
- Minamiaizu
- Shimogō
- Tadami
- Hinoemata

== Merger ==
- On 20 March 2006 the town of Tajima, and the villages of Tateiwa, Ina and Nangō merged to form the new town of Minamiaizu.
