= Higashi-Nagahara Station =

Railway station in Aizuwakamatsu, Fukushima Prefecture, Japan

Higashi-Nagahara Station 東長原駅
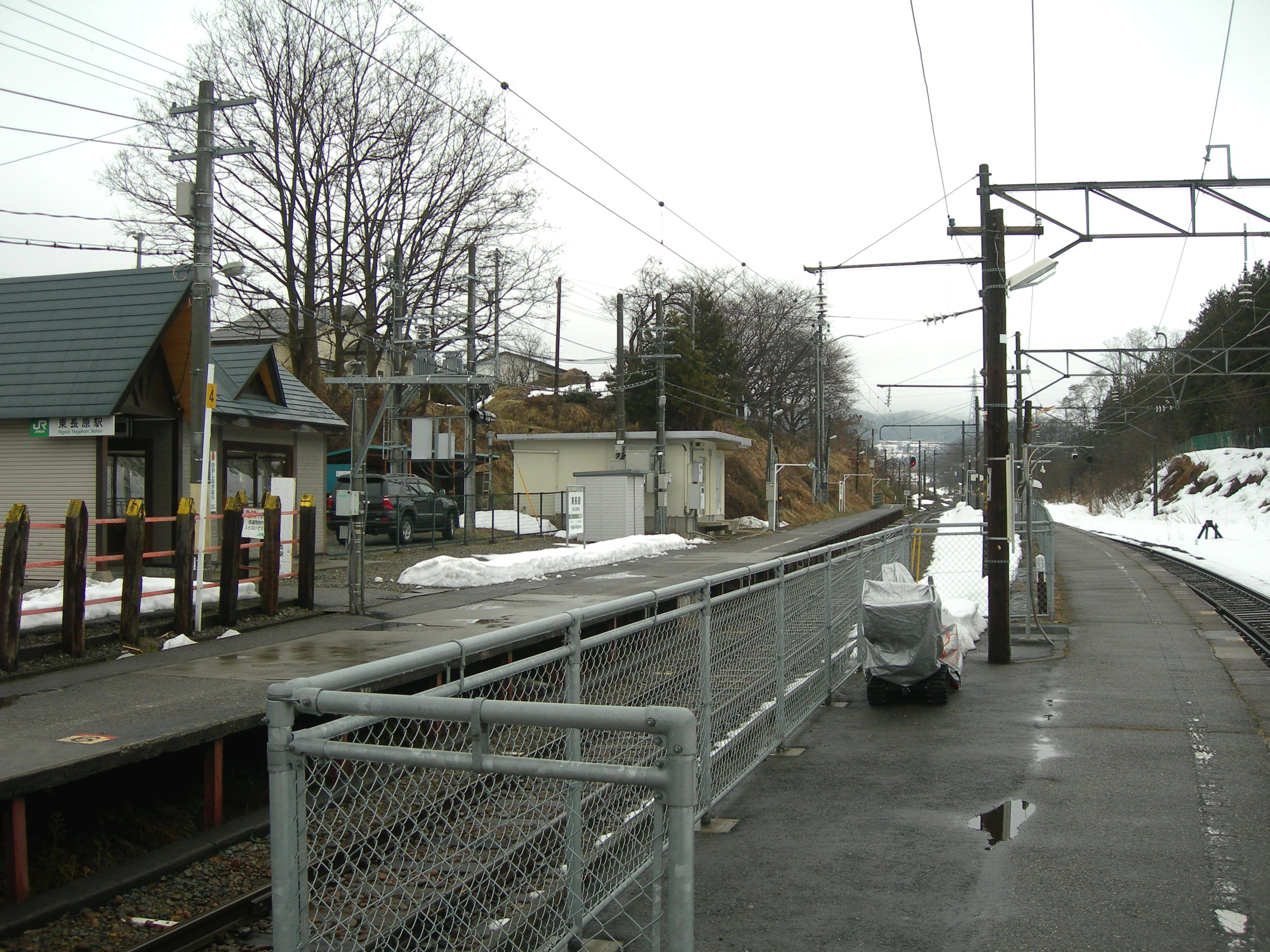
- Higashi-Nagahara Station, February 2010

General information
- Location: 3213 Ippongi Kumanodo Kawahigashi-machi, Aizuwakamatsu-shi, Fukushima-ken 969-3431; Japan
- Coordinates: 37.5667°N 139.9480°E
- Operator: JR East
- Line: ■ Ban'etsu West Line
- Distance: 57.2 km from Kōriyama
- Platforms: 2 side platforms
- Tracks: 2

Other information
- Status: Unstaffed
- Website: Official website

History
- Opened: December 20, 1940

Services
Preceding station	JR East	Following station
Hirota towards Kitakata	Ban'etsu West Line Rapid	Bandaimachi towards Kōriyama
Hirota towards Niitsu	Ban'etsu West Line Local	Bandaimachi towards Kōriyama
Location
- Location within Fukushima Prefecture Location within Japan

Higashi-Nagahara Station (東長原駅, Higashi-Nagahara-eki) is a railway station on the Ban'etsu West Line in the city of Aizuwakamatsu, Fukushima Prefecture, Japan, operated by East Japan Railway Company (JR East).

== Lines ==
Higashi-Nagahara Station is served by the Ban'etsu West Line, and is located 57.2 rail kilometers from the official starting point of the line at Kōriyama.

== Station layout ==
Higashi-Nagahara Station has a two opposed side platforms connected to the station building by a level crossing. The station is unattended.

=== Platforms ===
1	■ Ban'etsu West Line	for Inawashiro, Bandai-Atami and Koriyama
2	■ Ban'etsu West Line	for Aizu-Wakamatsu, Kitakata

== History ==
Higashi-Nagahara Station opened on December 20, 1940. The station was absorbed into the JR East network upon the privatization of the Japanese National Railways (JNR) on April 1, 1987.

== Surrounding area ==
- Higashi-Nagahara Post Office

== See also ==
- List of railway stations in Japan
