= Yunokami-Onsen Station =

Railway station in Shimogō, Fukushima Prefecture, Japan

Yunokami-Onsen Station 湯野上温泉駅
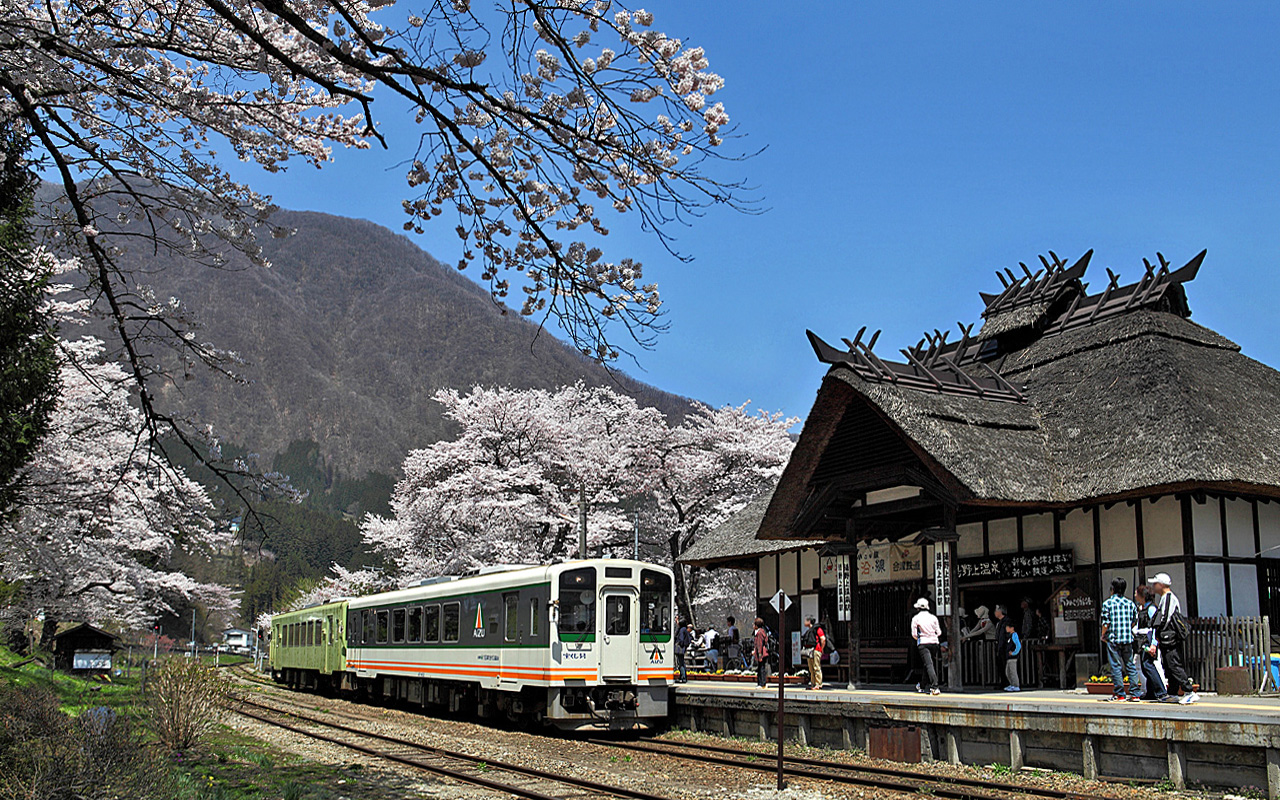
- A train arrives at Yunokami-Onsen Station in May 2010

General information
- Location: Yunokami Oshima, Shimogō-machi, Minamiaizu-gun, Fukushima-ken 969-5206; Japan
- Coordinates: 37°18′14″N 139°53′43″E
- Operator: Aizu Railway
- Line: ■Aizu Line
- Distance: 22.7 km from Nishi-Wakamatsu
- Platforms: 2 side platforms
- Tracks: 2

Other information
- Status: Staffed
- Website: Official website

History
- Opened: December 22, 1932
- Former names: Yunokami (until 1987)

Services
Preceding station	Aizu Railway	Following station
Tō-no-Hetsuri towards Aizu-Tajima	Aizu Line Rapid Relay	Ashinomaki-Onsen towards Aizu-Wakamatsu
Tō-no-Hetsuri towards Aizukōgen-Ozeguchi	Aizu Line Local	Ashinomaki-Onsen-Minami towards Aizu-Wakamatsu
Location
- Location within Fukushima Prefecture Location within Japan

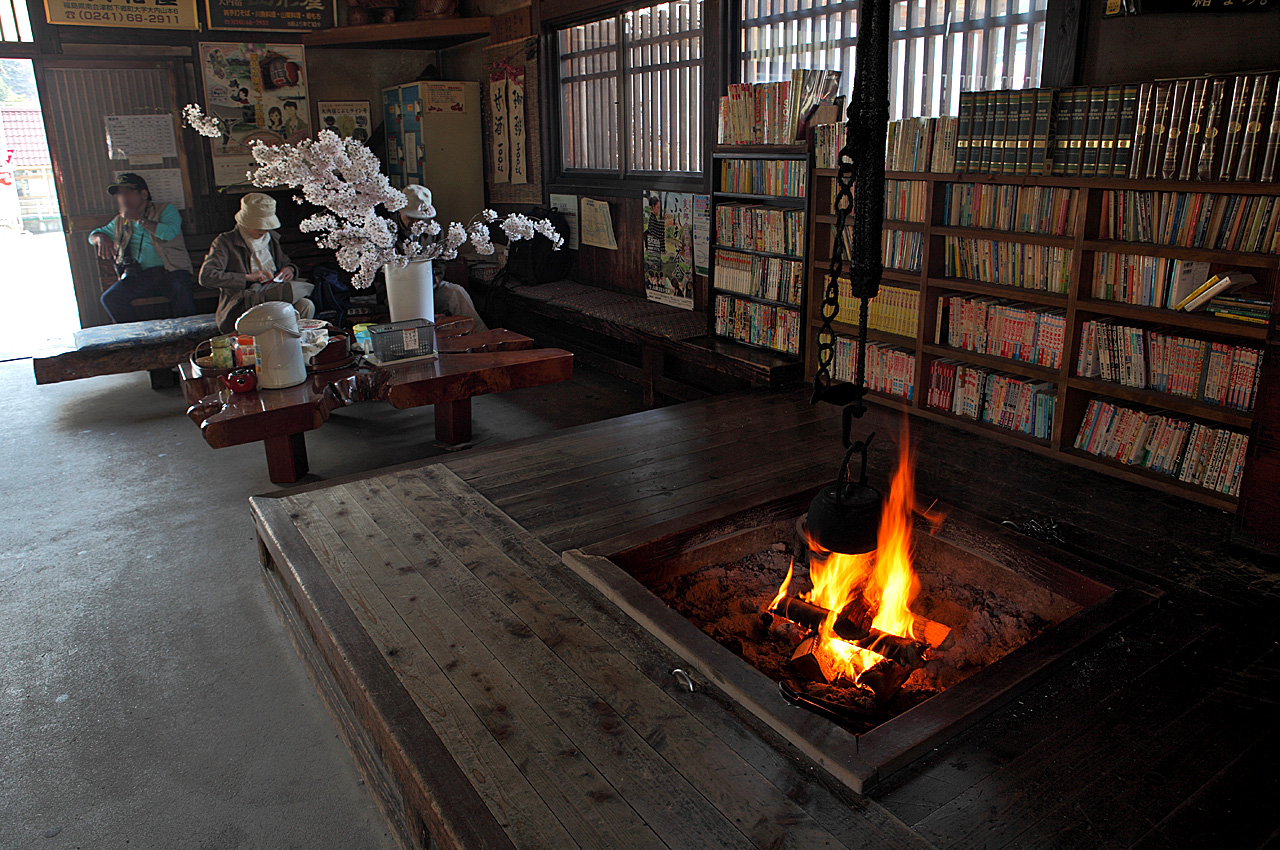
Waiting room of Yunokami Station

Yunokami-Onsen Station (湯野上温泉駅, Yunokami-Onsen-eki) is a railway station on the Aizu Railway Aizu Line in the town of Shimogō, Minamiaizu District, Fukushima Prefecture, Japan, operated by the Aizu Railway. The station is notable for its thatched roof.

== Lines ==
Yunokami-Onsen Station is served by the Aizu Line, and is located 22.7 rail kilometers from the official starting point of the line at Nishi-Wakamatsu.

== Station layout ==
Yunokami-Onsen Station has two opposed side platforms connected by a level crossing. The half-timbered thatch roof station building has an irori open hearth in the waiting room. The station is staffed.

=== Platforms ===
station side	■ Aizu Railway Aizu Line	for Aizu-Tajima, Aizukōgen-Ozeguchi
opposite side	■ Aizu Railway Aizu Line	for Aizu-Wakamatsu

== History ==
Yunokami-Onsen Station opened on December 22, 1932 as Yunokami Station (湯野上駅, Yunokami-eki). The station was transferred to the Aizu Railway on 16 July 1987.

== Surrounding area ==
- National Route 121
- Egawa Post Office
- Yunokami-Onsen
- Ōuchi-juku

== See also ==
- List of railway stations in Japan
