= Hirota Station =

Railway station in Aizuwakamatsu, Fukushima Prefecture, Japan

Hirota Station 広田駅
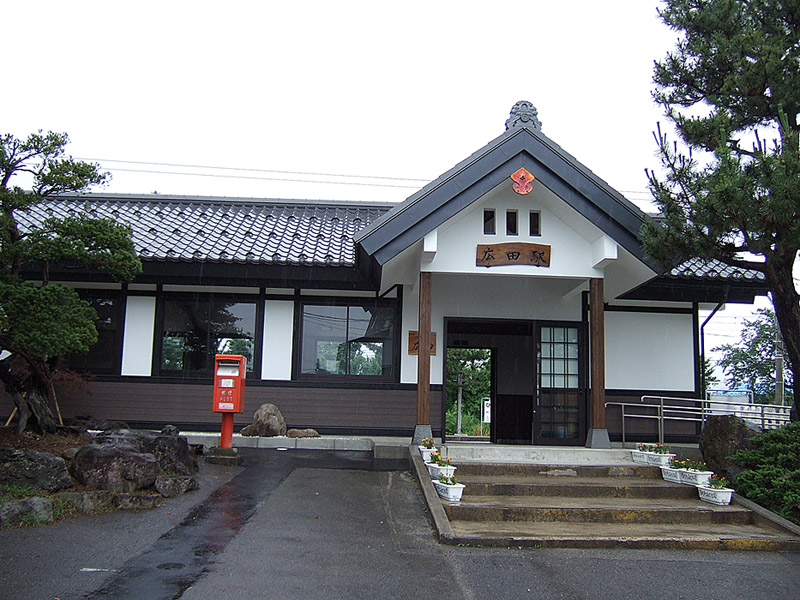
- Hirota Station, June 2008

General information
- Location: Nakajima Hirota Kawahigashi-machi, Aizuwakamatsu-shi, Fukushima-ken 969-3471; Japan
- Coordinates: 37.5493°N 139.9334°E
- Operator: JR East
- Line: ■ Ban'etsu West Line
- Distance: 60.0 km from Kōriyama
- Platforms: 1 side + 1 island platform
- Tracks: 3

Other information
- Status: Unstaffed
- Website: Official website

History
- Opened: July 15, 1899

Services
Preceding station	JR East	Following station
Aizu-Wakamatsu towards Kitakata	Ban'etsu West Line Rapid	Higashi-Nagahara towards Kōriyama
Aizu-Wakamatsu towards Niitsu	Ban'etsu West Line Local	Higashi-Nagahara towards Kōriyama
Location
- Location within Fukushima Prefecture Location within Japan

Hirota Station (広田駅, Hirota-eki) is a railway station on the Ban'etsu West Line in the city of Aizuwakamatsu, Fukushima Prefecture, Japan, operated by East Japan Railway Company (JR East).

== Lines ==
Hirota Station is served by the Ban'etsu West Line, and is located 60.0 rail kilometers from the official starting point of the line at Kōriyama.

== Station layout ==
Hirota Station has a one side platform and one island platform connected to the station building by a level crossing. The station is unattended.

=== Platforms ===
1	■ Ban'etsu West Line	for Inawashiro, Bandai-Atami and Koriyama
2, 3	■ Ban'etsu West Line	for Aizu-Wakamatsu, Kitakata

== History ==
Hirota Station opened on July 15, 1899. The station was absorbed into the JR East network upon the privatization of the Japanese National Railways (JNR) on April 1, 1987. The station building burned down o December 31, 2007 and was rebuilt in June 2008.

== Surrounding area ==
- former Kawahigashi Town Hall
- Hirota Post Office

== See also ==
- List of railway stations in Japan
