= Jingamine Castle =

Castle ruins from the Heian period, Aizubange, Tōhoku, Japan

- 陣が峯城
- Aizubange, Fukushima Prefecture, Japan
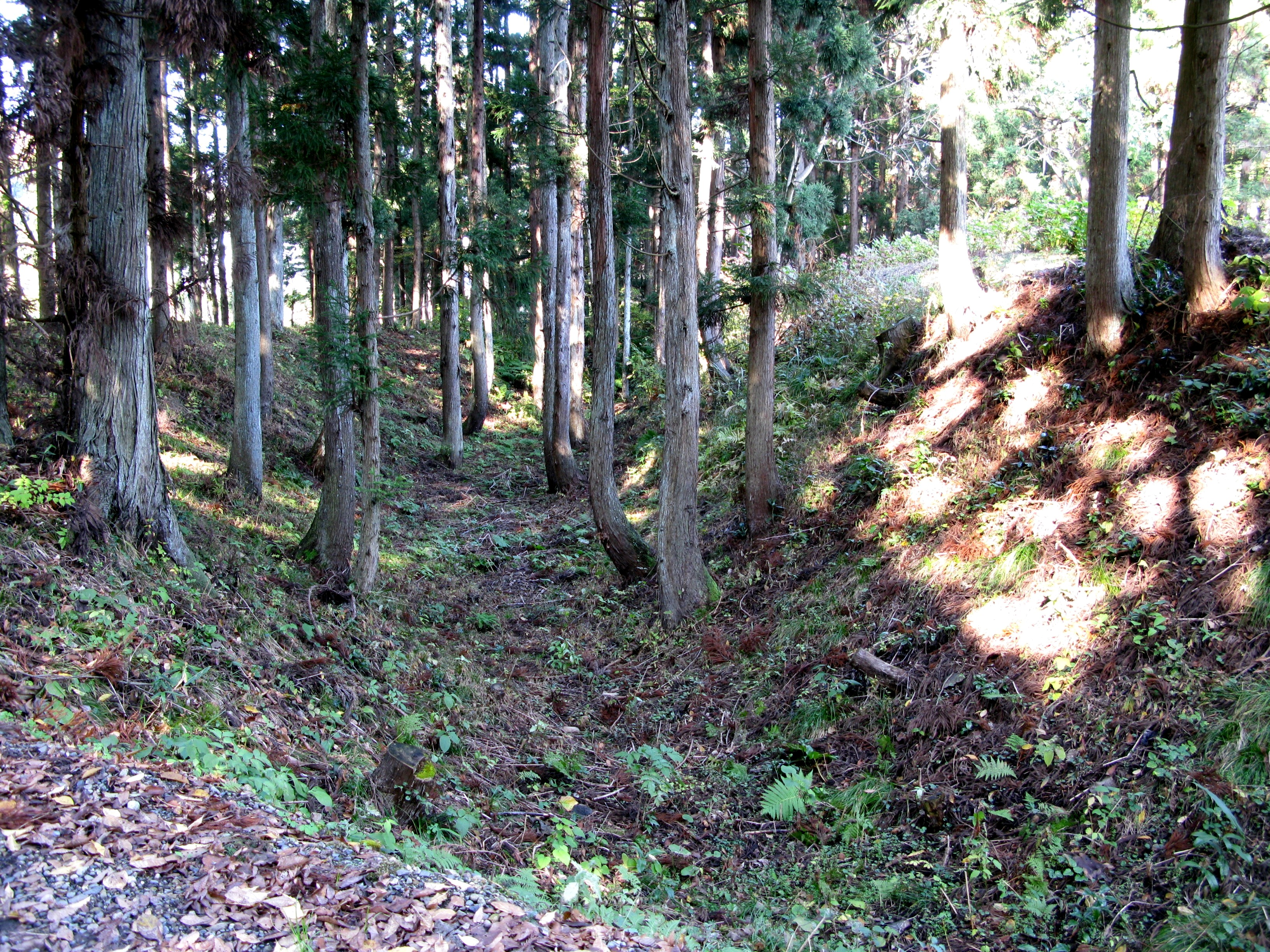
- Ruins of Jingamine Castle

Site information
- Type: Japanese castle
- Condition: Ruins

Location
- Location within Fukushima Prefecture Location within Japan
- Coordinates: 37°35′43″N 139°48′41″E

Site history
- Built: c.1114
- Built by: Fujiwara no Tadazane
- In use: Heian period

Jingamine Castle (陣が峯城, Jingamine jō) was a Heian period Japanese castle located in what is now the town of Aizubange, Fukushima Prefecture, in the southern Tōhoku region of Japan. The site has been protected by the central government as a National Historic Site since 2007.

== Overview ==
Jingamine Castle is located on a fan-shaped hill in the northwestern end of the Aizu Basin, with the Aga River to the north, and the main route to Echigo Province to the south, with an elevation of 192 meters. It is protected by a steep cliff on its eastern side. The castle site is roughly pentagonal, approximately 110 meters east–west and 175 meters north–south, surrounded on three sides by a double moat ranging from 30 to 60 meters in width and 15 meters in depth. Inside this enclosure was a large building with a pillar foundation, and numerous artifacts such as Chinese white porcelain, Korean celadons, bronze mirrors and weights have been found in large numbers. To the east of the site of the central structure, porcelain plates, carbonized wooden bowls and balls of rice, plus large quantities of carbonized rice and beans were discovered.

According to historical records, during the Heian period, this area was the "Inagawa no shō", a shōen belonging to one of the Five regent houses of the Fujiwara clan, and was possibility the fortified administrative center of the manor constructed by Fujiwara no Tadazane in 1114. Tadazane's grandson, Kujō Kanezane mentions the castle in his Gyokuyō diary, stating that the Jō clan of Echigo Province seized the castle after their defeat by Kiso Yoshinaka in the Gempei War, but were driven away by the forces of Fujiwara no Hidehira from Hiraizumi. The subsequent history of the castle is uncertain; however, as many of the artifacts discovered all date from roughly the twelfth century and have all been scorched or have been carbonized, and as a wide variety of iron projectile points have been found in large numbers everywhere within the interior, it is probable that the castle was destroyed in this conflict and never rebuilt.

The Aizubange Board of Education, where the archeological site is located, conducted an excavation survey for three years from 2002. The excavated relics were collectively designated as a Fukushima Prefectural Important Cultural Property in 2010. The site is approximately 12 minutes by car from Tōdera Station on the JR East Tadami Line.

== See also ==
- List of Historic Sites of Japan (Fukushima)
