= Aizu-Sakamoto Station =

Railway station in Aizubange, Fukushima Prefecture, Japan

Aizu-Sakamoto Station 会津坂本駅
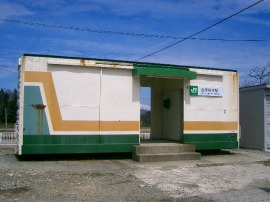
- Aizu-Sakamoto Station in April 2006

General information
- Location: Sakamoto, Aizubange-machi, Kawanuma-gun, Fukushima]-ken 969-6586; Japan
- Coordinates: 37.5534°N 139.7567°E
- Operator: JR East
- Line: ■ Tadami Line
- Distance: 29.7 km from Aizu-Wakamatsu
- Platforms: 1 side platform
- Tracks: 1

Other information
- Status: Unstaffed
- Website: Official website

History
- Opened: November 20, 1928

Services
Preceding station	JR East	Following station
Aizu-Yanaizu towards Koide	Tadami Line	Tōdera towards Aizu-Wakamatsu
Location
- Location within JR Tadami Line Location within Fukushima Prefecture Location within Japan

Aizu-Sakamoto Station (会津坂本駅, Aizu-Sakamoto-eki) is a railway station on the Tadami Line in the town of Aizubange, Fukushima Prefecture, Japan, operated by East Japan Railway Company (JR East).

== Lines ==
Aizu-Sakamoto Station is served by the Tadami Line, and is located 29.7 rail kilometers from the official starting point of the line at Aizu-Wakamatsu.

== Station layout ==
Aizu-Sakamoto Station has one side platform serving a single bi-directional track. The station is unattended.

== History ==
Aizu-Sakamoto Station opened on November 20, 1928, as an intermediate station on the initial eastern section of the Japanese National Railways (JNR) Tadami Line between Aizu-Wakamatsu and Aizu-Yanaizu. The station was absorbed into the JR East network upon the privatization of the JNR on April 1, 1987.

== Surrounding area ==
- National Route 49
- National Route 224

== See also ==
- List of railway stations in Japan
