= Ashinomaki-Onsen Station =

Railway station in Aizuwakamatsu, Fukushima Prefecture, Japan

Ashinomaki-Onsen Station 芦ノ牧温泉駅
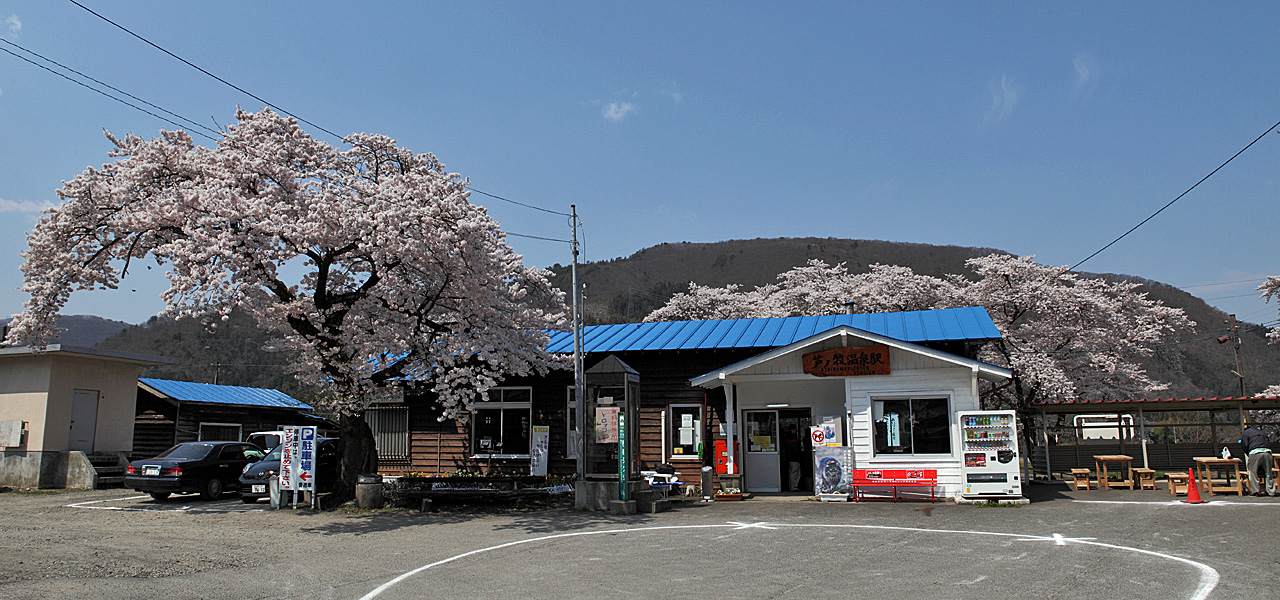
- Ashinomaki-Onsen Station in May 2010

General information
- Location: Oto-cho, Kamimiyori otsu 249, Aizuwakamatsu-shi, Fukushima-ken 969-5123; Japan
- Coordinates: 37°23′44″N 139°55′56″E
- Operator: Aizu Railway
- Line: ■Aizu Line
- Distance: 10.5 km from Nishi-Wakamatsu
- Platforms: 2 side platforms
- Tracks: 2

Other information
- Status: Staffed
- Website: Official website

History
- Opened: November 1, 1927
- Former names: Kami-Miyori (until 1987)

Services
Preceding station	Aizu Railway	Following station
Yunokami-Onsen towards Aizu-Tajima	Aizu Line Rapid Relay	Nishi-Wakamatsu towards Aizu-Wakamatsu
Ōkawadamukōen towards Aizukōgen-Ozeguchi	Aizu Line Local	Amaya towards Aizu-Wakamatsu
Location
- Location within Fukushima Prefecture Location within Japan

Ashinomaki-Onsen Station (芦ノ牧温泉駅, Ashinomaki-Onsen-eki) is a railway station on the Aizu Railway Aizu Line in the city of Aizuwakamatsu, Fukushima Prefecture, Japan, operated by the Aizu Railway.

== Lines ==
Ashinomaki-Onsen Station is served by the Aizu Line, and is located 10.5 rail kilometers from the official starting point of the line at Nishi-Wakamatsu.

== Station layout ==
Ashinomaki-Onsen Station has two opposed unnumbered side platforms connected by a level crossing. The station is staffed.

=== Platforms ===
station side	■ Aizu Line	for Aizu-Tajima and Aizukōgen-Ozeguchi
opposite side	■ Aizu Line	for Aizu-Wakamatsu and Kitakata

== Bus, Love and Peach, the station master cats ==
The station is home to Bus (ばす, Basu), a long-haired cat who acts as the station master in a manner similar to Tama of Kishi Station. Bus was named after the Catbus from My Neighbor Totoro. Bus had been a resident of the station since June, 2000. She was appointed as the honorary stationmaster in April 2008. She had worked with a human station master and retired in December 2015. Love (らぶ, Rabu) succeeded the honorary stationmaster. He started working with them from July, 2014. Bus stayed in the station also after retirement with the title of honorary stationmaster of admirable longevity. She died on April 22, 2016. On October 14, 2017, Peach (ぴーち, Pichi), who is Love's younger brother, was appointed as the rail manager (Head of facilities management). He retired in March 2020. Sakura (さくら, Sakura), who is a younger sister of Love and Peach, began to work as an apprentice station staff in the spring 2020. She was appointed as an attendant on April 17, 2021. On October 5, 2022, Love died at the age of eight. On November 5, 2023, Sakura was appointed as the honorary stationmaster.

== History ==
Ashinomaki-Onsen Station opened on November 1, 1927, as Kamimiyori Station (上三寄駅, Kamimiyori-eki). The station was transferred to the ownership of the Aizu Railway on 16 July 1987.

== Surrounding area ==
- National Route 118
- Kamimiyori Post Office
- Ashinomaki-Onsen

== See also ==
- List of railway stations in Japan
