= Aizu-Toyokawa Station =

Railway station in Kitakata, Fukushima Prefecture, Japan

Aizu-Toyokawa Station 会津豊川駅
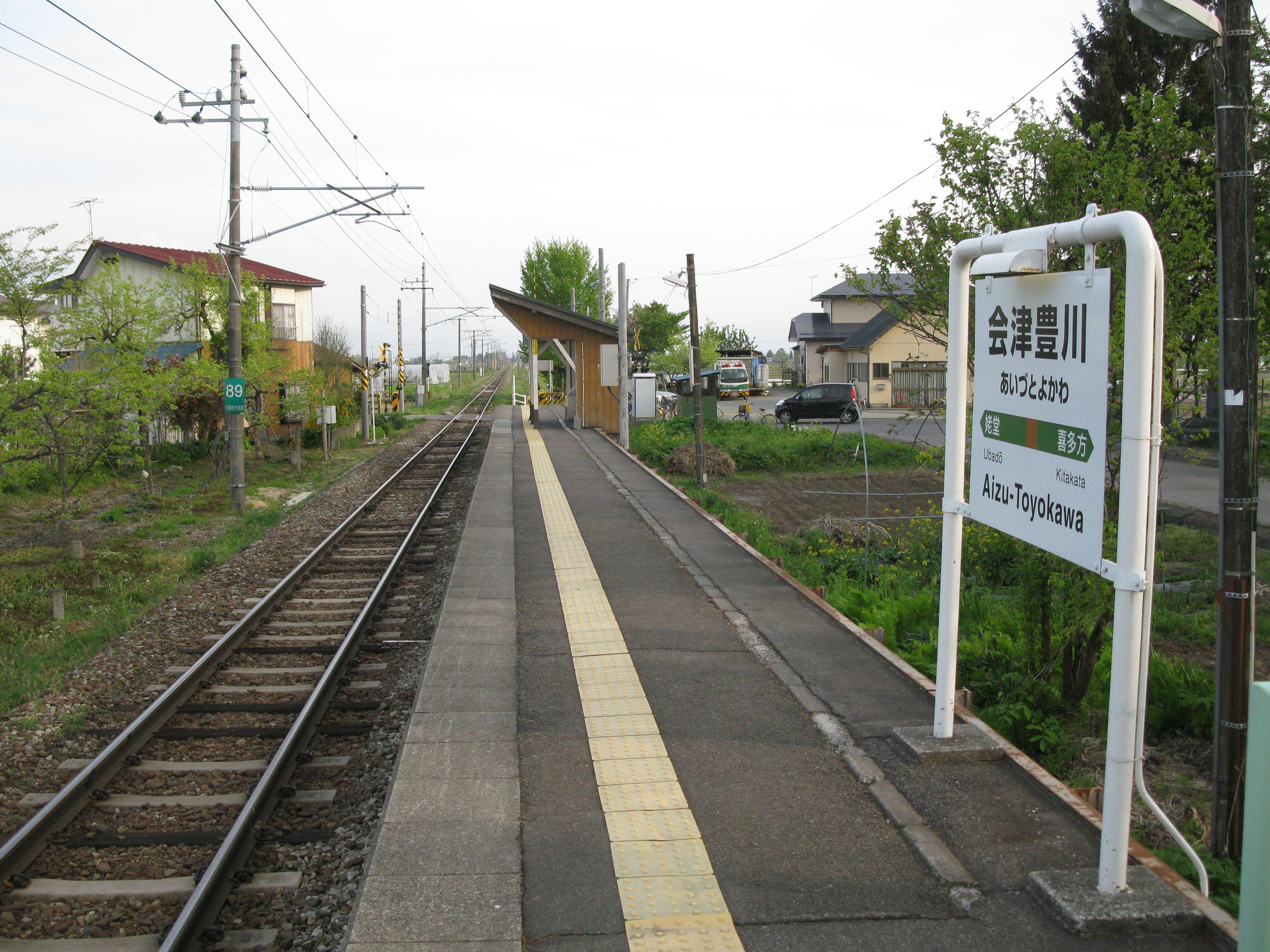
- Aizu-Toyokawa Station, May 2011

General information
- Location: Toyokawamachi Ichii, Kitakata-shi, Fukushima-ken 966-0912; Japan
- Coordinates: 37.6337°N 139.8769°E
- Operator: JR East
- Line: ■ Ban'etsu West Line
- Distance: 79.5 km from Kōriyama
- Platforms: 1 side platform
- Tracks: 1

Other information
- Status: Unstaffed
- Website: Official website

History
- Opened: November 1, 1934

Services
Preceding station	JR East	Following station
Kitakata towards Niitsu	Ban'etsu West Line Local	Ubadō towards Kōriyama
Location
- Location within Fukushima Prefecture Location within Japan

Aizu-Toyokawa Station (会津豊川駅, Aizu-Toyokawa-eki) is a railway station on the Ban'etsu West Line in the city of Kitakata, Fukushima Prefecture, Japan, operated by East Japan Railway Company (JR East).

== Lines ==
Aizu-Toyokawa Station is served by the Ban'etsu West Line, and is located 79.5 rail kilometers from the official starting point of the line at Kōriyama.

== Station layout ==
Aizu-Toyokawa Station has one side platform serving a single bi-directional track. The station is unattended.

== History ==
Aizu-Toyokawa Station opened on November 1, 1934. The station was closed for a one-year period from June 10, 1945, to June 10, 1946. The station was absorbed into the JR East network upon the privatization of the Japanese National Railways (JNR) on April 1, 1987.

== Surrounding area ==
- Kitakata Prefectural Too High School
- Kitakata City Toyokawa Elementary School

== See also ==
- List of railway stations in Japan
