= Aizubange =

Aizubange 会津坂下町
- Town
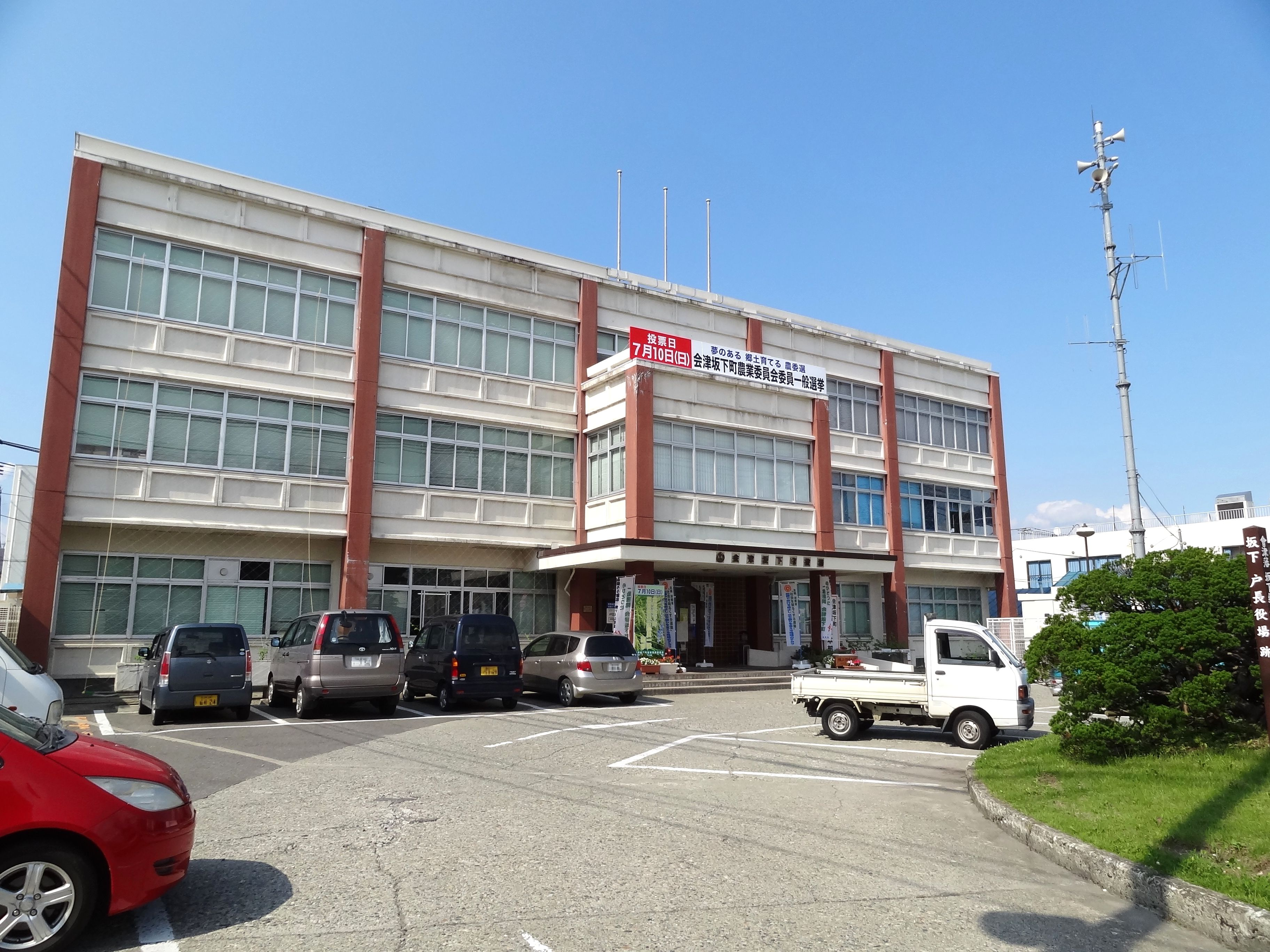
- Aizubange Town Hall

- Flag Seal

- Location of Aizubange in Fukushima Prefecture

- Coordinates: 37°33′41.3″N 139°49′17.9″E
- Country: Japan
- Region: Tōhoku
- Prefecture: Fukushima
- District: Kawanuma

Area
  - Total: 91.59 km^{2} (35.36 sq mi)

Population (April 2020)
  - Total: 15,159
  - Density: 165.5/km^{2} (428.7/sq mi)
- Time zone: UTC+9 (Japan Standard Time)
- Symbols
  - Tree: Sakura
  - Flower: Chrysanthemum
  - Bird: Japanese bush warbler
- Phone number: 0242-84-1503
- Address: 3662 Sanban-ko Ichinaka, Aizubange-machi, Kawanuma-gun, Fukushima-ken 969-6547
- Website: Official website

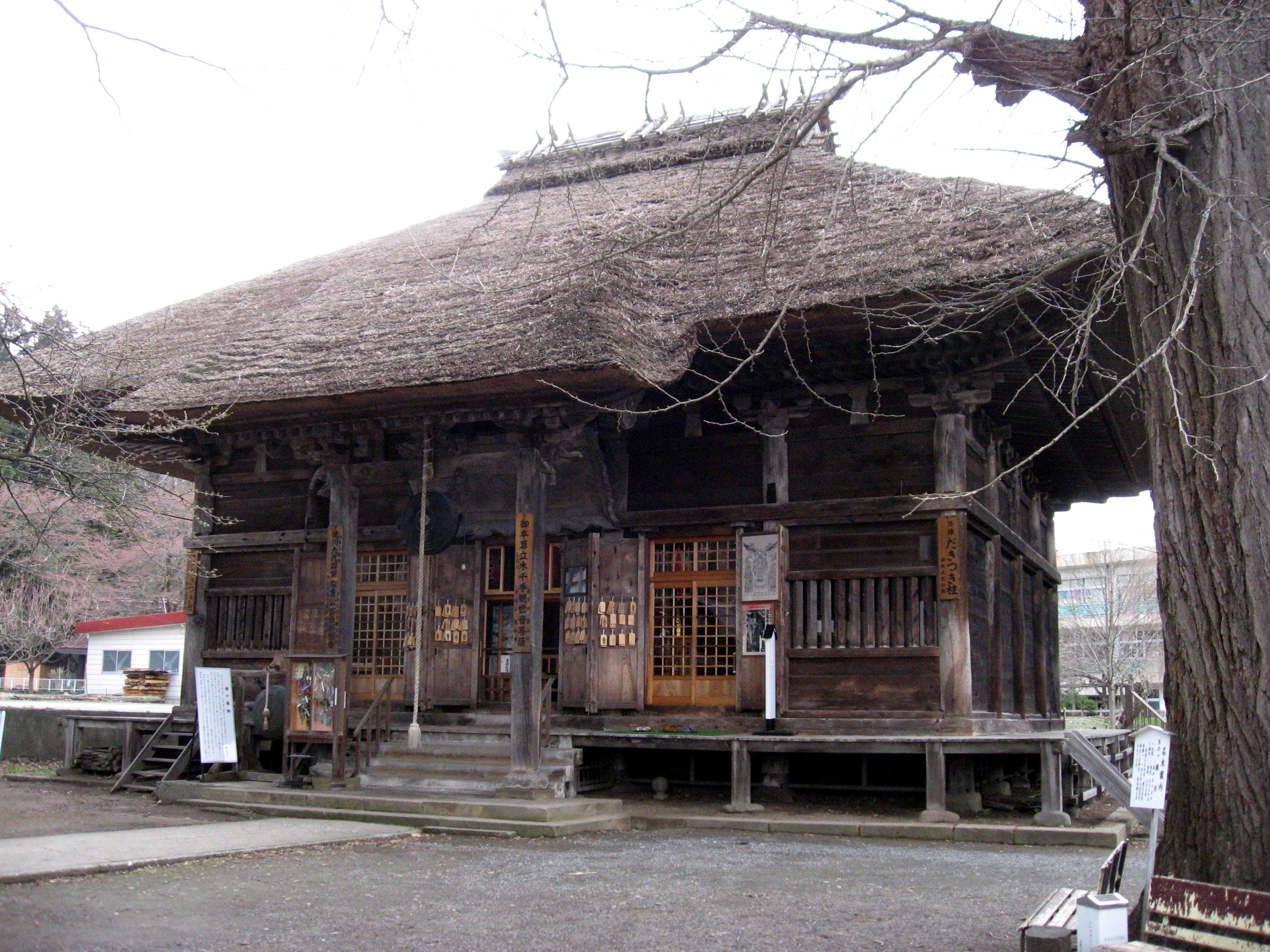
Eryū-ji temple in Aizubange

Aizubange (会津坂下町, Aizubange-machi) is a town located in Fukushima Prefecture, Japan. As of 1 April 2020, the town had an estimated population of 15,159 in 5487 households, and a population density of 170 persons per km^{2}. The total area of the town was 91.59 square kilometres (35.36 sq mi).

== Geography ==
Aizubange is located in the northern portion of the Aizu region of Fukushima Prefecture in the western part of Aizu Basin. The basin extends from the center of the town to the east and is relatively flat, with many paddy fields. On the other hand, the western part of the town has many forests. The Aga River flows from the east to the north of the town, and the Tadami River flows to the west.

- Mountains : Mount Takadera
- Rivers : Tadami River, Agakawa

=== Neighboring municipalities ===
Fukushima Prefecture

- Aizumisato
- Aizuwakamatsu
- Kitakata
- Nishiaizu
- Yanaizu
- Yugawa

== Climate ==
Aizubange has a humid continental climate (Köppen Dfb) characterized by warm summers and cold winters with heavy snowfall. The average annual temperature in Aizubange is 11.6 °C. The average annual rainfall is 1399 mm with September as the wettest month. The temperatures are highest on average in August, at around 25.2 °C, and lowest in January, at around −1.2 °C.

== Demographics ==
Per Japanese census data, the population of Aizubange has declined steadily over the past 60 years.

Historical population
Year	Pop.	±%
1960	25,867	—
1970	21,720	−16.0%
1980	20,504	−5.6%
1990	20,332	−0.8%
2000	19,426	−4.5%
2010	17,262	−11.1%
2020	15,068	−12.7%

== History ==
The area of present-day Aizubange was part of ancient Mutsu Province. The area formed part of the holdings of Aizu Domain during the Edo period. After the Meiji Restoration, the area was organized as part of Kawanuma District. Fukushima Prefecture. The town of Bange was established on April 1, 1889, with the creation of the modern municipalities system. The town of Aizubange was founded on April 1, 1955, by the merger of the town of Bange with the Wakamiya, Kanagami, Hirose, Kawanishi and Yawata.

== Economy ==
The economy of Aizubange is centered on the production of rice, with much of the town area under paddy fields.

== Education ==
Aizubange has two public elementary schools and one public junior high school operated by the town government. The town has two public high schools operated by the Fukushima Prefectural Board of Education.

== Transportation ==
=== Railway ===
JR East – Tadami Line

- Wakamiya – Aizu-Bange – Tōdera – Aizu-Sakamoto

=== Highway ===
- Ban-etsu Expressway – Aizubange IC
- National Route 49
- National Route 252

== Local attractions ==
- Eryū-ji – Buddhist temple with Important Cultural Property Kannon-dō.
- site of Jingamine Castle (National Historic Site)
- Kamegamori-Chinjumori Kofun (National Historic Site)

== Noted people from Aizubange ==
- Yoshitaka Egawa, basketball player
- Hachiro Kasuga, singer
- Kiyoshi Saitō, artist
- Takeda Sōkaku, martial artist
- Hiroshi Takahashi, manga artist
