= Yoshitaka Egawa =

Japanese basketball player (1942–2024)

Personal information
- Nationality: Japanese
- Born: 20 December 1942 Aizubange, Fukushima, Japan
- Died: 26 December 2024 (aged 82) Kisarazu, Japan

Sport
- Sport: Basketball

Yoshitaka Egawa (江川 嘉孝, Egawa Yoshitaka; 20 December 1942 – 26 December 2024) was a Japanese basketball player. He competed in the men's tournament at the 1964 Summer Olympics. Egawa died in Kisarazu on 26 December 2024, at the age of 82.
