= Shōjō-ji =

Buddhist temple in Fukushima Prefecture, Japan

Shōjō-ji 勝常寺
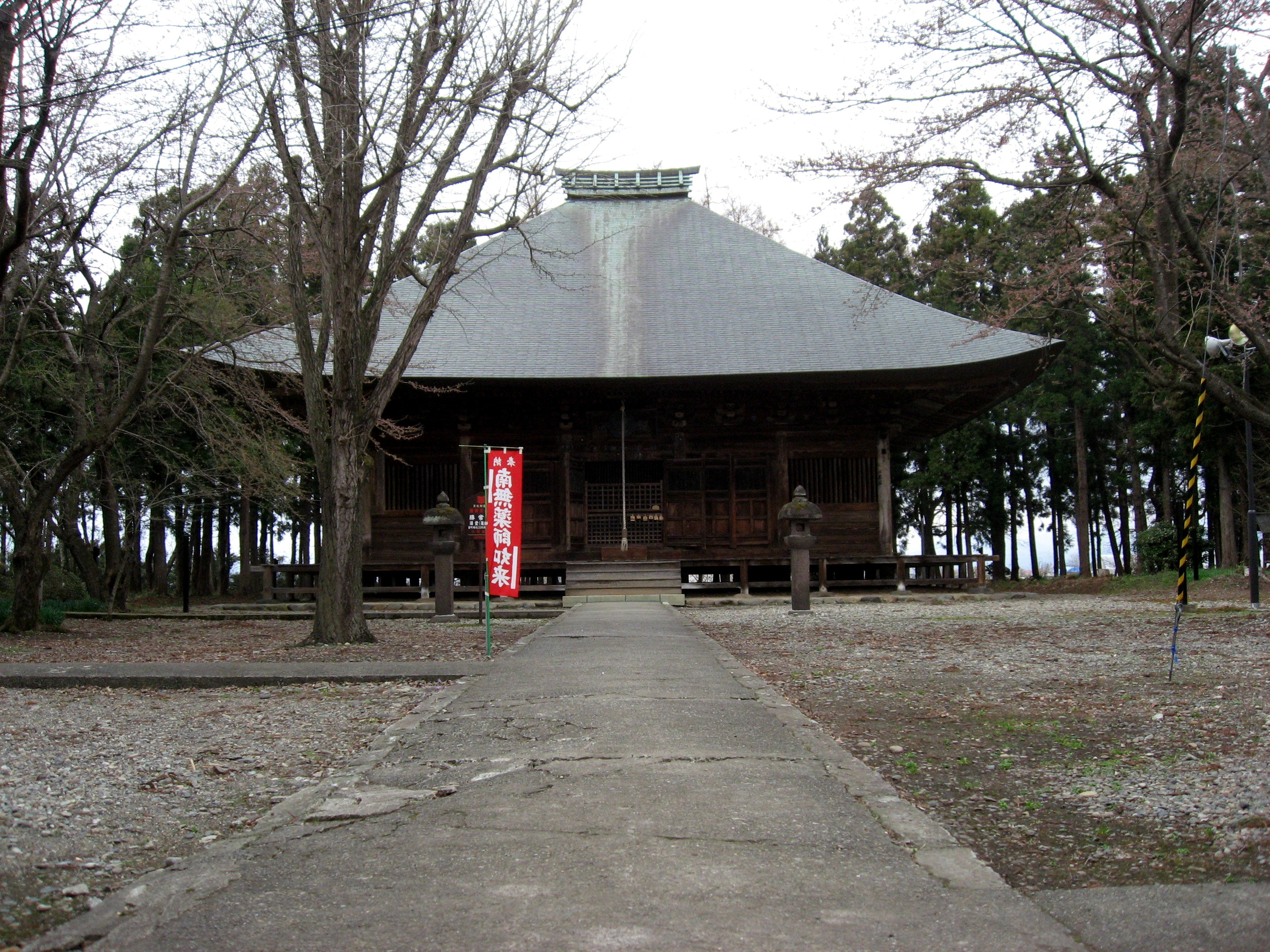
- Yakushi Hall (Important Cultural Property)

- Location within Fukushima Prefecture Location within Japan

Religion
- Affiliation: Buddhist
- Deity: Yakushi Nyorai
- Rite: Shingon-shu Buzan-ha

Location
- Location: Yugawa, Fukushima Prefecture
- Country: Japan
- Interactive map of Shōjō-ji 勝常寺
- Coordinates: 37°33′48″N 139°52′12.28″E

Architecture
- Founder: Tokuitsu
- Completed: c.807

Shōjō-ji (勝常寺) is a Buddhist temple of the Shingon-shu Buzan-ha sect in Yugawa, Kawanuma District, Fukushima Prefecture, Japan.

== History ==
Shōjō-ji was opened in 807 by the Hossō sect scholar-monk Tokuitsu. The original name of the temple is not known, but the present name has been in use since medieval times. At the time of foundation it was a large temple forming a complete Shichidō garan, many attached buildings, twelve houses for monks and more than 100 sub-temples. Today, the temple consists among others of the original auditorium (Yakushi Hall), the residence of the head priest (reception hall), the kitchen, the central gate (chūmon) and more than 30 Buddhist statues.

== The Legend of Shōjō-ji ==
There is a hundreds year old Japanese legend from about the mid-to-late Edo Period that takes place at the temple of Shōjō-Ji. In the legend, raccoon dogs (known as Tanuki) come to gather at the temple while monks perform a ceremony. A song titled "Shojoji Tanuki no Bayashi" was composed in 1925 by Nakayama Shinpei (中山 晋平, 1887–1952) telling the story of the Tanuki celebration. Every October at the temple, a festival is held in remembrance of the story passed down for many generations.

== Buildings and cultural assets ==
Of the more than 30 Buddha statues at Shōjō-ji, 12 date from the early Heian period, and probably date from the original construction of the temple. It is very rare except for temples in Kansai area for a temple to have so many statues of such antiquity.

=== Yakushi-do ===
The current Yakushi-do is an early Muromachi period structure, and is designated as a National Important Cultural Property. However, the original thatched roof was replaced by copper sheathing in 1964. The location of this building is on the site of the Lecture Hall in the original temple layout, and there are traces of burn marks on the foundation stones, including that the temple burned down before this building was constructed.

=== Yakushi Sanzon ===
The main image at Shōjō-ji is a statue of Yakushi Nyorai, flanked by Nikko Bosatsu and Gakko Bosatsu. The main Yakushi Nyorai image remains in the Yakushi-do, but the side statues have been transferred to storage for safekeeping. The main Yakushi Nyorai image is made from a block of Zelkova serrata, divided front-to-back. The statue dates from the early 9th century and was designated a National Treasure in 1996.

=== Other statuary ===
Five statues and one group of four statues) at Shōjō-ji dating from the early Heian period have been designated national Important Cultural Properties:

- Four Heavenly Kings (group of four statues)
- Juichimen Kannon Bosatsu
- Sho Kannon Bosatsu
- Jizo Bosatsu ("Longevity Jizo")
- Jizo Bosatsu ("Rain-bringing Jizo")
- Unidentified Bosatsu (possibly Kokuzo Bosatsu)

== See also ==
- List of National Treasures of Japan (sculptures)
