= Ubadō Station =

Railway station in Kitakata, Fukushima Prefecture, Japan

Ubadō Station 姥堂駅
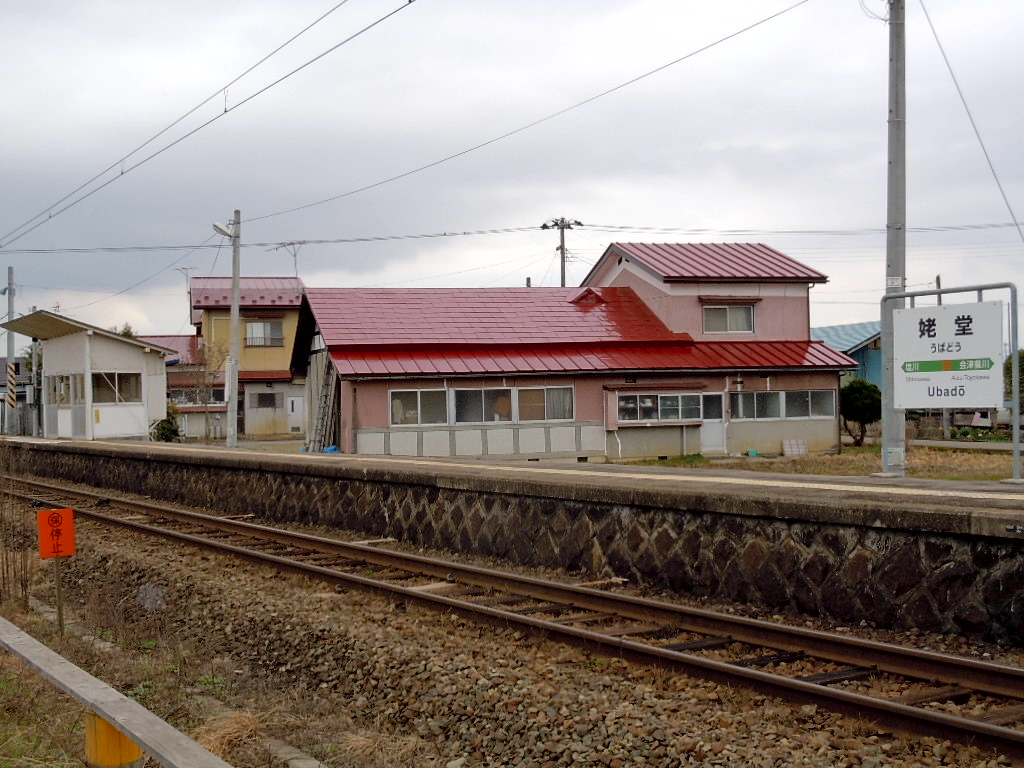
- Ubadō Station in April 2010

General information
- Location: 618 Niidaiyachi, Shiokawa-machi, Kitakata-shi, Fukushima-ken 969-3531; Japan
- Coordinates: 37.6160°N 139.8812°E
- Operator: JR East
- Line: ■ Ban'etsu West Line
- Distance: 79.5 km from Kōriyama
- Platforms: 1 side platform
- Tracks: 1

Other information
- Status: Unstaffed
- Website: Official website

History
- Opened: 1 November 1934

Passengers
- FY2004: 6 daily

Services
Preceding station	JR East	Following station
Aizu-Toyokawa towards Niitsu	Ban'etsu West Line Local	Shiokawa towards Kōriyama
Location
- Location within Fukushima Prefecture Location within Japan

Ubadō Station (姥堂駅, Ubadō-eki) is a railway station on the Banetsu West Line in the city of Kitakata, Fukushima Prefecture, Japan, operated by East Japan Railway Company (JR East).

== Lines ==
Ubadō Station is served by the Ban'etsu West Line, and is located 79.5 kilometers from the official starting point of the line at Kōriyama.

== Station layout ==
Ubadō Station has one side platform, serving a single bi-directional track. The station is unattended.

== History ==
Ubadō Station opened on November 1, 1934. The station was closed for one year from June 10, 1945 to June 10, 1946. The station was absorbed into the JR East network upon the privatization of the Japanese National Railways (JNR) on April 1, 1987.

== Surrounding area ==
- National Route 121
- Ubadō River

== See also ==
- List of railway stations in Japan
