= Dōjima Station =

Railway station in Aizuwakamatsu, Fukushima Prefecture, Japan

Dōjima Station 堂島駅
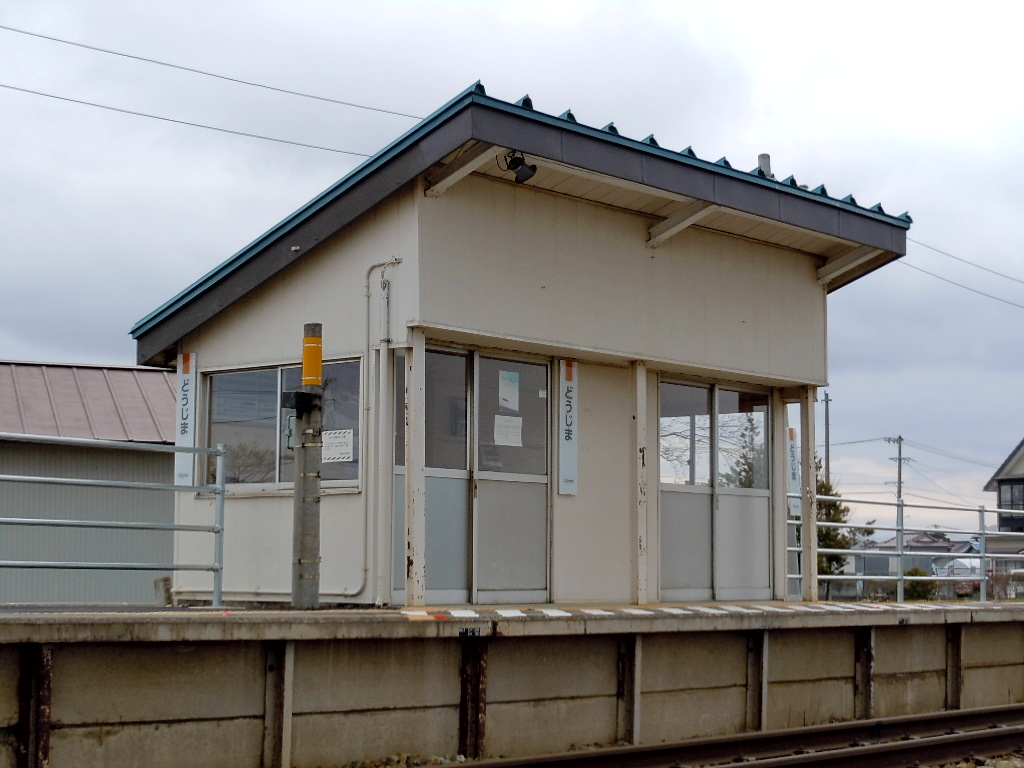
- Dōjima Station in April 2010

General information
- Location: Kawahigashi-machi Kōriyama, Aizuwakamatsu-shi, Fukushima-ken 969-3481; Japan
- Coordinates: 37.5549°N 139.9118°E
- Operator: JR East
- Line: ■ Ban'etsu West Line
- Distance: 70.1 km from Kōriyama
- Platforms: 1 side platform
- Tracks: 1

Other information
- Status: Unstaffed
- Website: Official website

History
- Opened: 1 November 1934

Services
Preceding station	JR East	Following station
Oikawa towards Niitsu	Ban'etsu West Line Local	Aizu-Wakamatsu towards Kōriyama
Location
- Location within Fukushima Prefecture Location within Japan

Dōjima Station (堂島駅, Dōjima-eki) is a railway station on the Banetsu West Line in the city of Aizuwakamatsu, Fukushima Prefecture, Japan, operated by East Japan Railway Company (JR East).

== Lines ==
Dōjima Station is served by the Banetsu West Line, and is located 70.1 kilometers from the official starting point of the line at Kōriyama.

== Station layout ==
Dōjima Station has one side platform serving a single bi-directional track. There is no station building, and the station is unattended.

== History ==
Dōjima Station opened on November 1, 1934. The station was absorbed into the JR East network upon the privatization of the Japanese National Railways (JNR) on April 1, 1987.

== Surrounding area ==
- Dōjima Post Office
- National Route 121

== See also ==
- List of railway stations in Japan
