= Shiokawa Station =

Railway station in Kitakata, Fukushima Prefecture, Japan

Coordinates: 37.5940°N 139.8871°E

Shiokawa Station 塩川駅
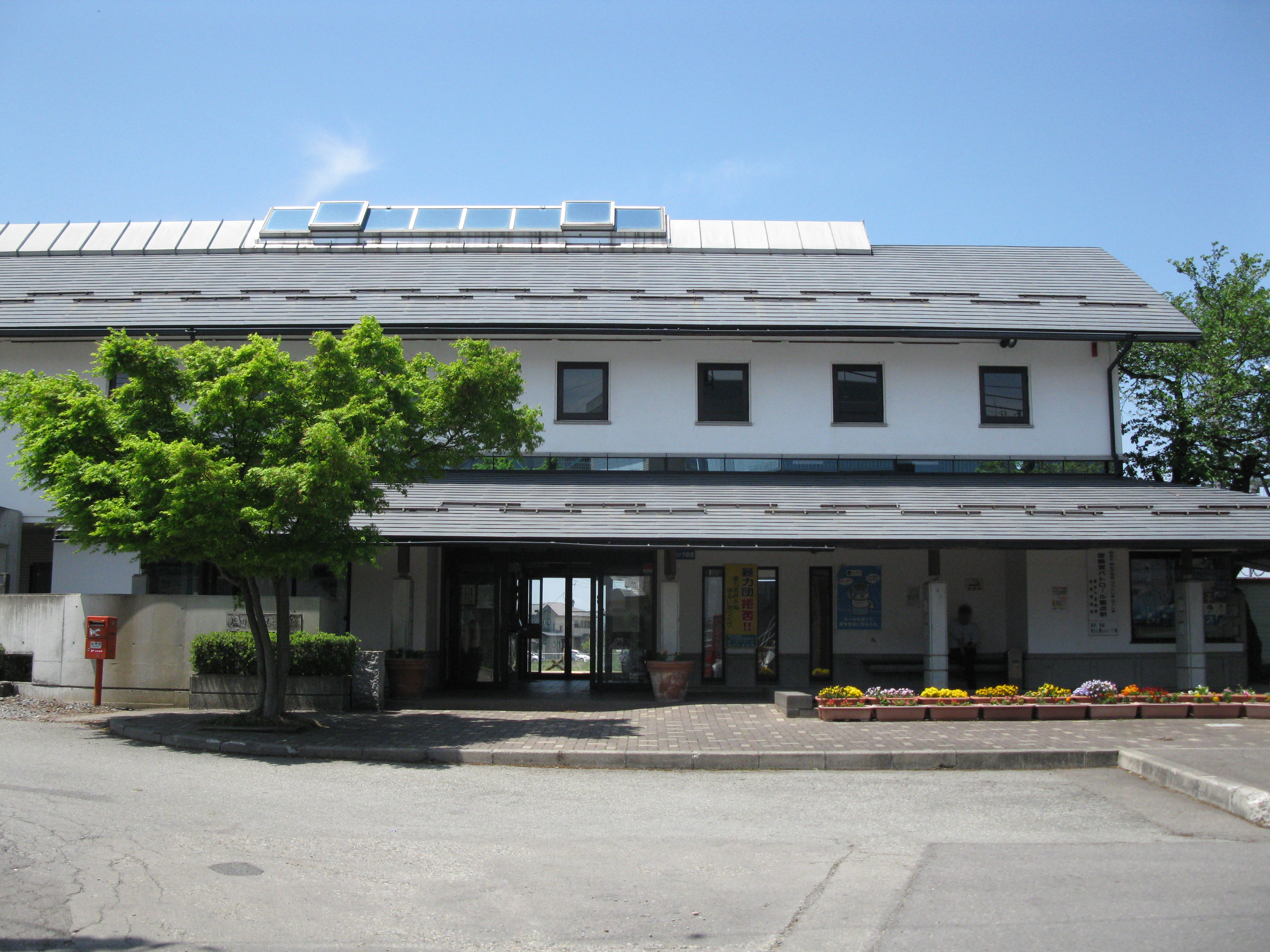
- Shiokawa Station, May 2011

General information
- Location: 851-2 Ishibashi, Shiokawa-machi, Kitakata, Fukushima （福島県喜多方市塩川町字石橋851-2） Japan
- Operator: JR East
- Line: Ban'etsu West Line

History
- Opened: 1904

Passengers
- FY 2013: 307 daily

Services
Preceding station	JR East	Following station
Kitakata Terminus	Ban'etsu West Line Rapid	Aizu-Wakamatsu towards Kōriyama
Kitakata towards Niitsu	Ban'etsu West Line Rapid Agano	Aizu-Wakamatsu Terminus
Ubadō towards Niitsu	Ban'etsu West Line Local	Oikawa towards Kōriyama
Location

Shiokawa Station (塩川駅, Shiokawa-eki) is a railway station on the Ban'etsu West Line in Kitakata, Fukushima Prefecture, Japan. The station is operated by East Japan Railway Company (JR East).

== Lines ==
Shiokawa Station is served by the Ban'etsu West Line, and is located 75.1 rail kilometers from the official starting point of the line at Kōriyama Station.

== Station layout ==
Shiokawa Station has a single island platform and a single side platform connected to the station building by an overhead passageway.

=== Platforms ===
1	■ Ban'etsu West Line	for Aizu-Wakamatsu and Kōriyama
2	■ Ban'etsu West Line	for Kitakata, Nozawa and Niitsu

3	■ Ban'etsu West Line	for Kitakata (once per day)

== History ==
Shiokawa Station opened on January 20, 1904. The station was absorbed into the JR East network upon the privatization of the Japanese National Railways (JNR) on April 1, 1987.

== Surrounding area ==
- former Shiokawa Town Hall
- Japan National Route 121
- Shiokawa Post Office
