= Yugawa, Fukushima =

Yugawa 湯川村
- Village
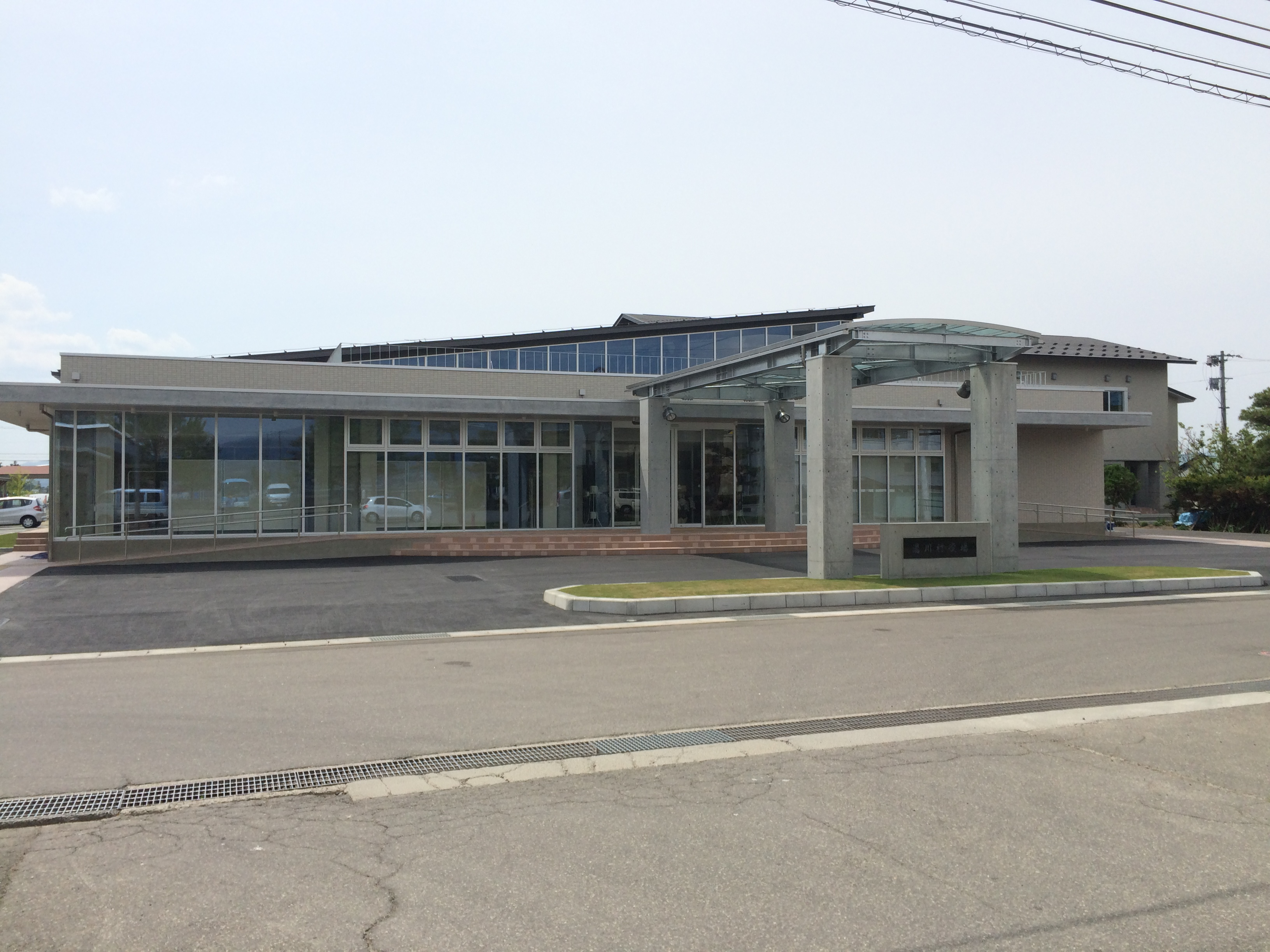
- Yugawa Village Hall

- Flag Seal

- Location of Yugawa in Fukushima Prefecture

- Coordinates: 37°33′56.6″N 139°53′12.7″E
- Country: Japan
- Region: Tōhoku
- Prefecture: Fukushima
- District: Kawanuma

Area
  - Total: 16.37 km^{2} (6.32 sq mi)

Population (February 2020)
  - Total: 3,051
  - Density: 186.4/km^{2} (482.7/sq mi)
- Time zone: UTC+9 (Japan Standard Time)
- City symbols
  - Tree: Sakura (cherry blossom)
  - Flower: Chrysanthemum
  - Bird: Common cuckoo
- Phone number: 0241-27-8800
- Address: 875-5 Oikawa Nagatoro-ko, Yugawa-mura, Kawanuma-gun, Fukushima-ken 969-3593
- Website: Official website

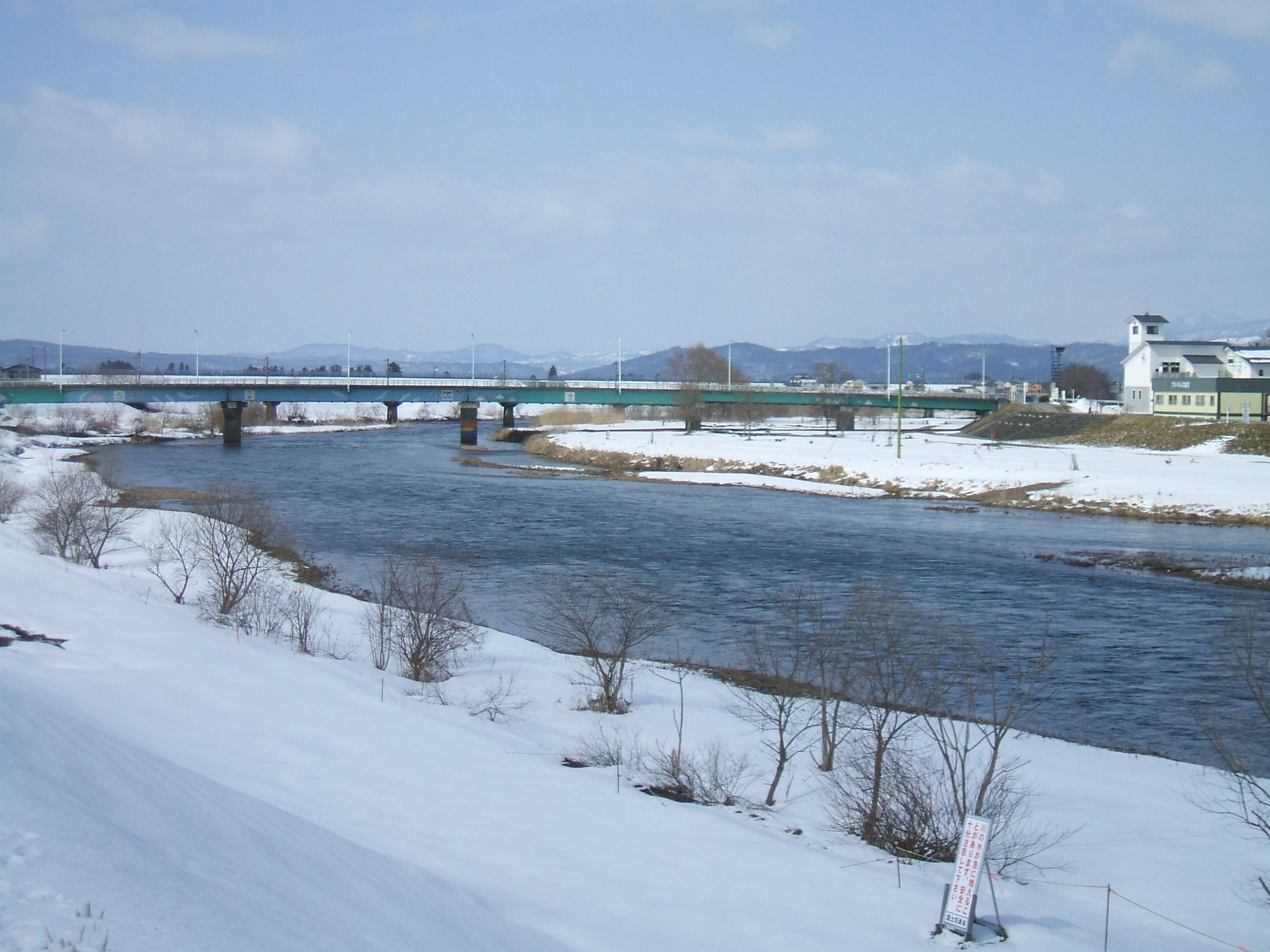
Nippashi River at Yugawa

Yugawa (湯川村, Yugawa-mura) is a village located in Fukushima Prefecture, Japan. As of 1 February 2020, the village had an estimated population of 3,051 in 924 households, and a population density of 190 persons per km^{2}. The total area of the village was 16.37 square kilometres (6.32 sq mi)..

== Geography ==
Yugawa is located in the northern portion of the Aizu region of Fukushima Prefecture, in center of the Aizu Basin.

- Rivers : Nippashi River, Agakawa River

=== Neighboring municipalities ===
Fukushima Prefecture

- Aizubange
- Aizuwakamatsu
- Kitakata

== Demographics ==
Per Japanese census data, the population of Yugawa has declined steadily over the past 70 years.

Historical population
Year	Pop.	±%
1920	4,714	—
1930	5,143	+9.1%
1940	5,191	+0.9%
1950	5,759	+10.9%
1960	5,220	−9.4%
1970	4,207	−19.4%
1980	3,789	−9.9%
1990	3,686	−2.7%
2000	3,601	−2.3%
2010	3,365	−6.6%
2020	3,081	−8.4%

== Climate ==
Yugawa has a humid continental climate (Köppen Dfb) characterized by warm summers and cold winters with heavy snowfall. The average annual temperature in Yugawa is 11.9 °C. The average annual rainfall is 1383 mm with September as the wettest month. The temperatures are highest on average in August, at around 25.6 °C, and lowest in January, at around -0.8 °C.

== History ==
The area of present-day Yugawa was part of ancient Mutsu Province. During the early Heian period, the Buddhist temple of Shōjō-ji was founded in what is now part of Yugawa village. The area formed part of the holdings of Aizu Domain during the Edo period. After the Meiji Restoration, the area was organized as part of Kawanuma District. Fukushima Prefecture. The villages of Oikawa and Shōjō were created with the establishment of the modern municipalities system on April 1, 1889. These villages merged to form Yugawa on March 31, 1957.

== Economy ==
The economy of Yugawa is centered on the production of rice, with much of the town area under paddy fields. Asparagus is also a major cash crop.

== Education ==
Yugawa has two public elementary schools and one public junior high school operated by the village government. The village does not have a high school.

== Transportation ==
=== Railway ===
JR East – Ban'etsu West Line

- Oikawa

=== Highway ===
- National Route 49
- National Route 121

== Local attractions ==
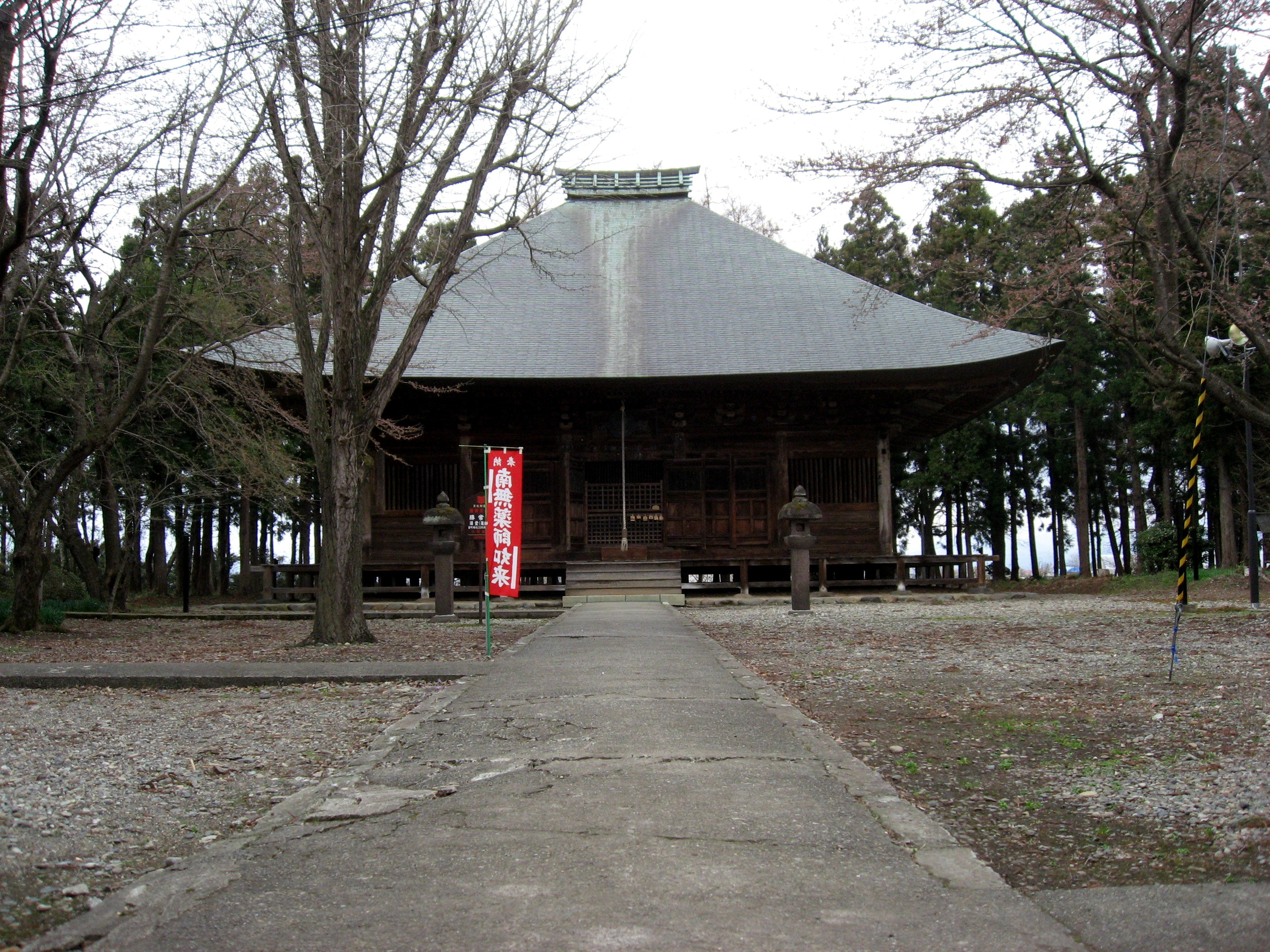
Shōjō-ji Yakushi-do

- Shōjō-ji – Buddhist temple with Important Cultural Property buildings and National Treasure sculptures.
