= Tōdera Station =

Railway station in Aizubange, Fukushima Prefecture, Japan

Tōdera Station 塔寺駅
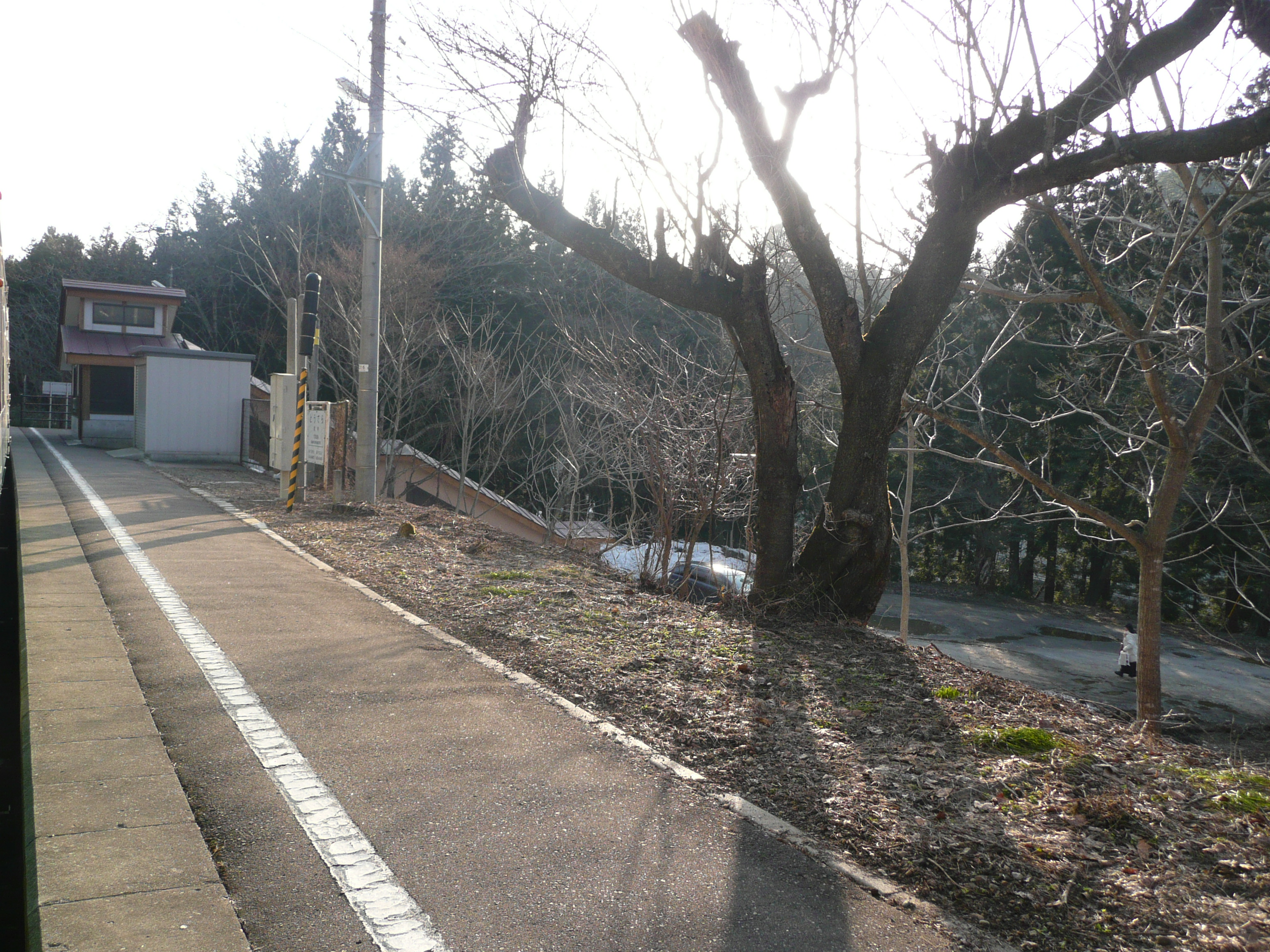
- Tōdera Station in March 2008

General information
- Location: Kitanomiya, Aizubange-machi, Kawanuma-gun, Fukushima-ken 969-6583; Japan
- Coordinates: 37.5695°N 139.7851°E
- Operator: JR East
- Line: ■ Tadami Line
- Distance: 26.0 km from Aizu-Wakamatsu
- Platforms: 1 side platform
- Tracks: 1

Other information
- Status: Unstaffed
- Website: Official website

History
- Opened: November 20, 1928

Services
Preceding station	JR East	Following station
Aizu-Sakamoto towards Koide	Tadami Line	Aizu-Bange towards Aizu-Wakamatsu
Location
- Location within JR Tadami Line Location within Fukushima Prefecture Location within Japan

Tōdera Station (塔寺駅, Tōdera-eki) is a railway station on the Tadami Line in the town of Aizubange, Fukushima Prefecture, Japan, operated by East Japan Railway Company (JR East).

== Lines ==
Tōdera Station is served by the Tadami Line, and is located 26.0 rail kilometers from the official starting point of the line at Aizu-Wakamatsu.

== Station layout ==
Tōdera Station has one side platform serving a single bi-directional track. The station is unattended.

== History ==
Tōdera Station opened on November 20, 1928, as an intermediate station on the initial eastern section of the Japanese National Railways (JNR) Tadami Line between Aizu-Wakamatsu and Aizu-Yanaizu. The station was absorbed into the JR East network upon the privatization of the JNR on April 1, 1987. A new station building was completed in March 2002.

== Surrounding area ==
- Kitanomiya Post Office
- National Route 49

== See also ==
- List of railway stations in Japan
