= Oikawa Station =

Railway station in Yugawa, Fukushima Prefecture, Japan

Oikawa Station 笈川駅
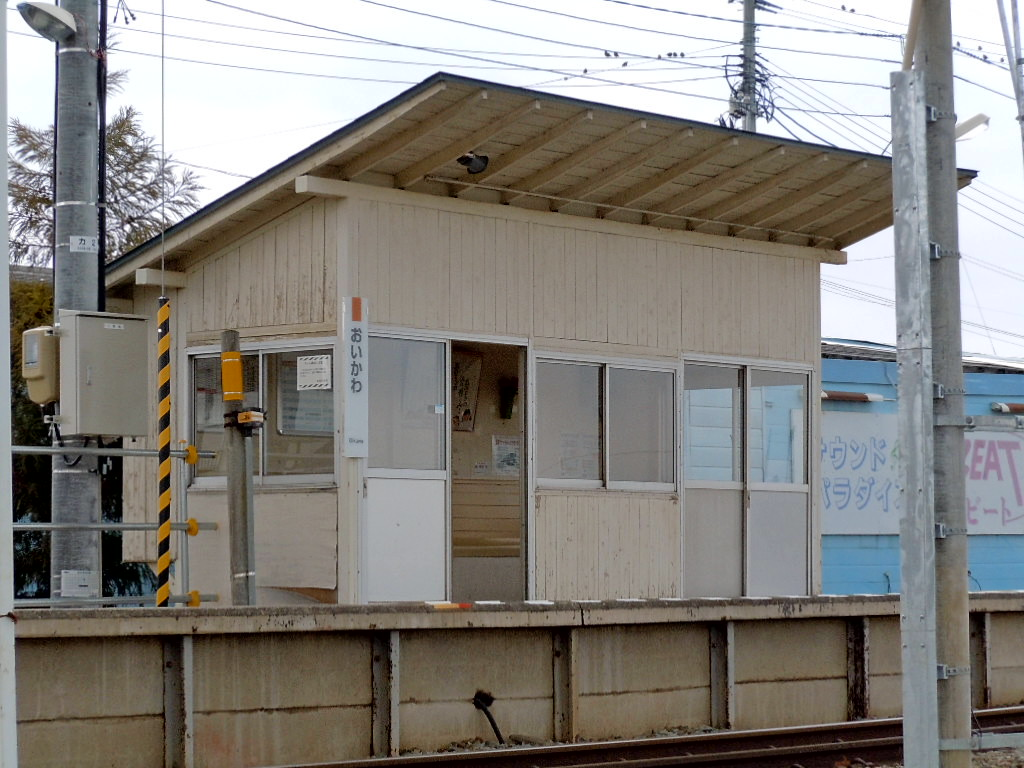
- Oikawa Station

General information
- Location: Matsumaeotsu Minato, Yugawa-mura, Kawanuma-gun, Fukushima-ken 969-3542; Japan
- Coordinates: 37.5789°N 139.8952°E
- Operator: JR East
- Line: ■ Ban'etsu West Line
- Distance: 73.2 km from Kōriyama
- Platforms: 1 side platform
- Tracks: 1

Other information
- Status: Unstaffed
- Website: Official website

History
- Opened: 1 November 1934

Services
Preceding station	JR East	Following station
Shiokawa towards Niitsu	Ban'etsu West Line Local	Dōjima towards Kōriyama
Location
- Location within Fukushima Prefecture Location within Japan

Oikawa Station (笈川駅, Oikawa-eki) is a train station in the village of Yugawa, Kawanuma District, Fukushima Prefecture, Japan.

== Lines ==
Oikawa Station is served by the Ban'etsu West Line, and is 73.2 kilometers from the terminus of the line at Kōriyama.

== Station layout ==
The station consists of one side platform serving a single bi-directional track. The station is unattended. There is no station building, but only a prefabricated shelter on the platform.

== History ==
The station opened on 1 November 1934. With the privatization of Japanese National Railways (JNR) on 1 April 1987, the station came under the control of JR East.

== Surrounding area ==
- Oikawa Elementary School
- National Route 121

== See also ==
- List of railway stations in Japan
