= Kitakata Station =

Railway station in Kitakata, Fukushima Prefecture, Japan

Kitakata Station 喜多方駅
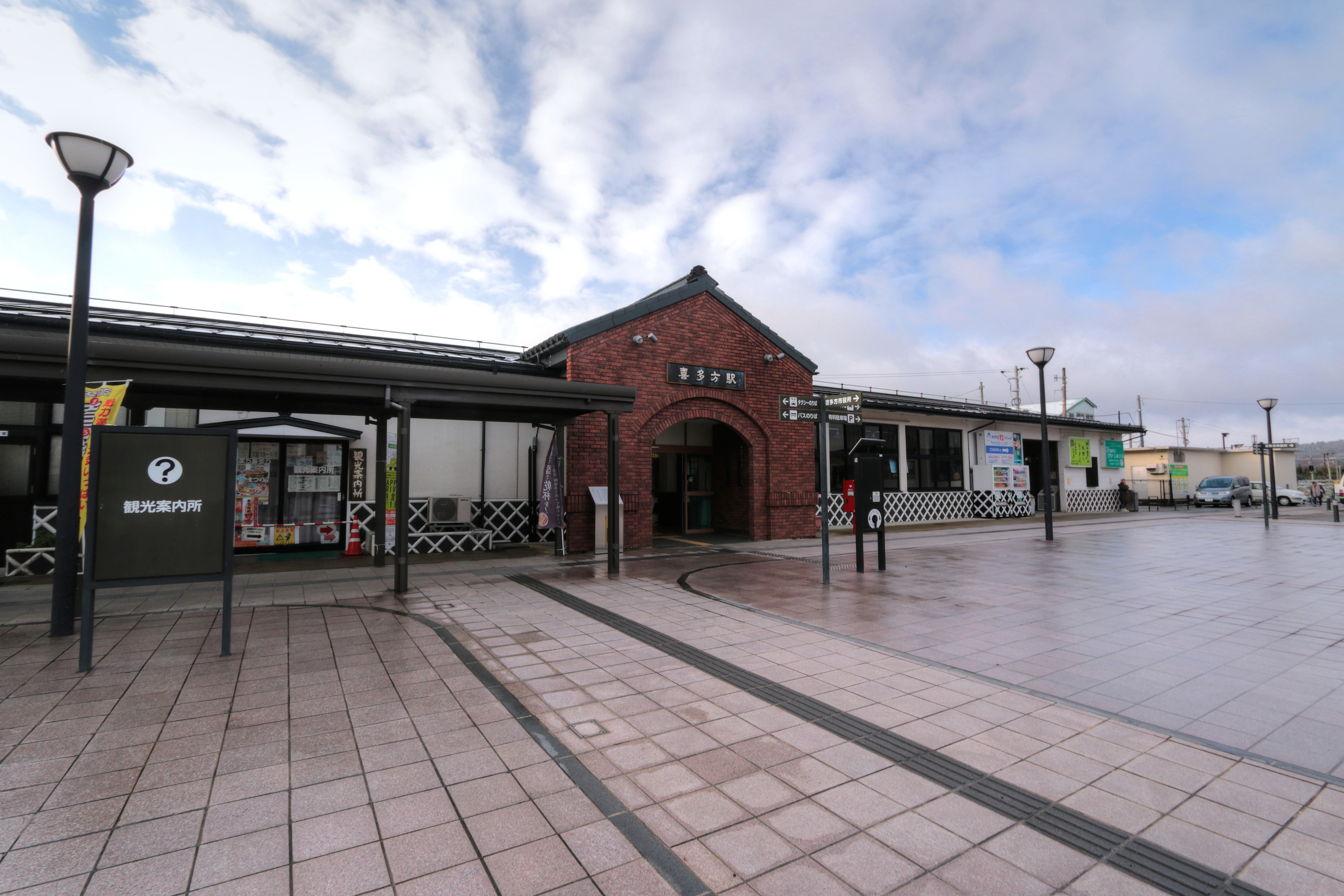
- Kitakata Station, December 2015

General information
- Location: Machidashita, Kitakata-shi, Fukushima-ken 966-0846; Japan
- Coordinates: 37.6439°N 139.8683°E
- Operator: JR East
- Line: ■ Ban'etsu West Line
- Distance: 81.2 km from Kōriyama
- Platforms: 1 island + side platform
- Tracks: 3

Other information
- Status: Staffed (Midori no Madoguchi )
- Website: Official website

History
- Opened: January 20, 1904

Passengers
- FY 2017: 909 daily

Services
Preceding station	JR East	Following station
Terminus	Ban'etsu West Line Rapid	Shiokawa towards Kōriyama
Yamato towards Niitsu	Ban'etsu West Line Rapid Agano	Shiokawa towards Aizu-Wakamatsu
Yamato towards Niitsu	Ban'etsu West Line Local	Aizu-Toyokawa towards Kōriyama
Location
- Location within Fukushima Prefecture Location within Japan

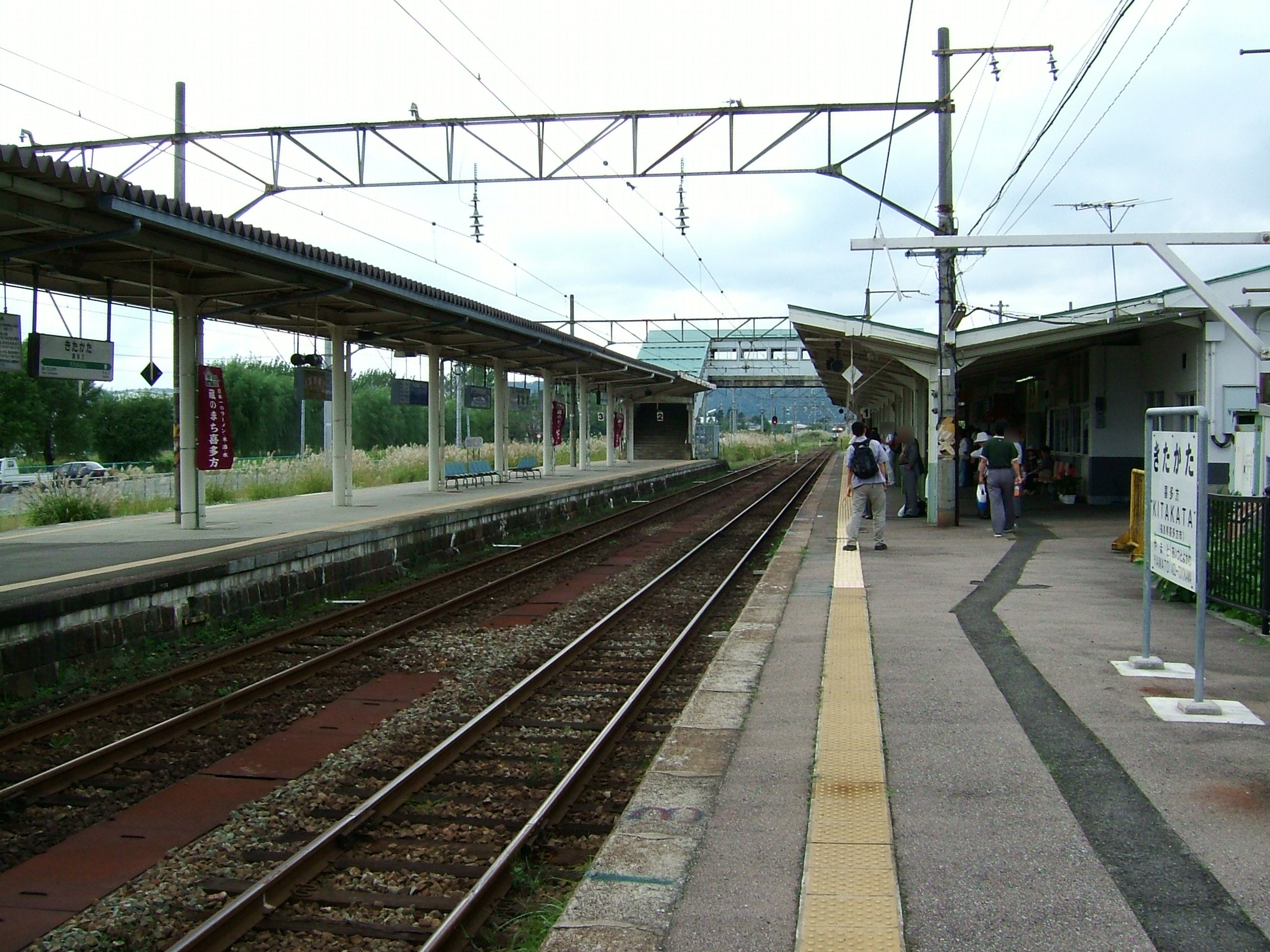
Platforms at Kitakata Station, September 2004

Kitakata Station (喜多方駅, Kitakata-eki) is a railway station on the Ban'etsu West Line in the city of Kitakata, Fukushima Prefecture, Japan, operated by East Japan Railway Company (JR East).

== Lines ==
Kitakata Station is served by the Ban'etsu West Line, located 81.2 rail kilometers from the official starting point of the line at Kōriyama.

== Station layout ==
Kitakata Station has a single side platform and a single island platform connected to the station building by a footbridge. The station has a Midori no Madoguchi staffed ticket counter.

=== Platforms ===
1	■ Ban'etsu West Line	for Aizu-Wakamatsu and Kōriyama for Nozawa and Niitsu
2	■ Ban'etsu West Line	for Aizu-Wakamatsu and Kōriyama (SL-service) for Nozawa and Niitsu (rush hours only)
3	■ Ban'etsu West Line	for Aizu-Wakamatsu and Kōriyama (starting trains)

== History ==
Kitakata Station opened on January 20, 1904. The station was absorbed into the JR East network upon the privatization of the Japanese National Railways (JNR) on April 1, 1987.

== Passenger statistics ==
In fiscal 2017, the station was used by an average of 909 passengers daily (boarding passengers only).

== Surrounding area ==
- Kitakata City Hall
- Kitakata Post Office
- National Route 459

== See also ==
- List of railway stations in Japan
