= Aizu-Wakamatsu Station =

Railway station in Aizuwakamatsu, Fukushima Prefecture, Japan

Aizu-Wakamatsu Station 会津若松駅
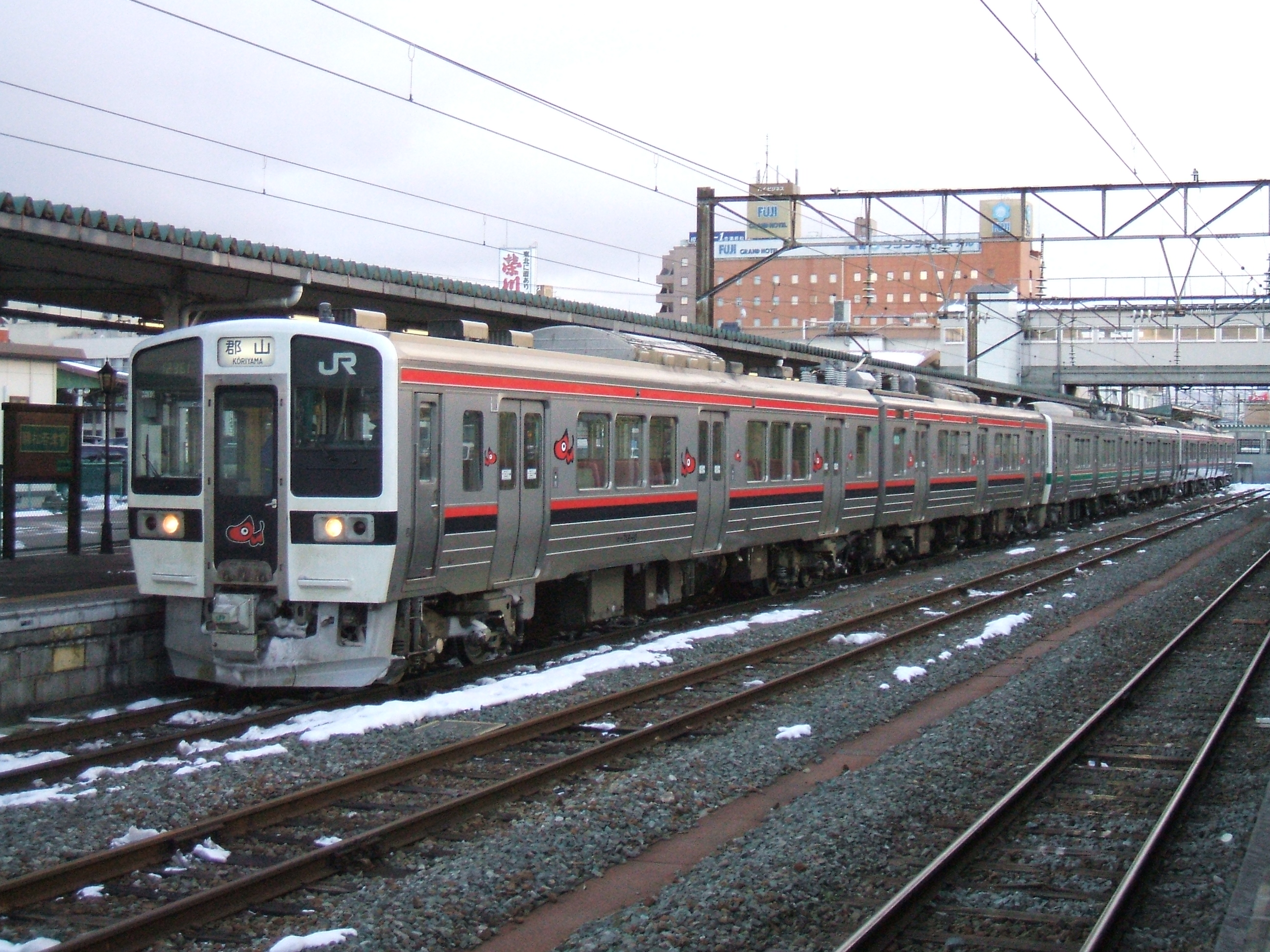
- Aizu-Wakamatsu Station, platform 1

General information
- Location: Ekimae-cho, Aizuwakamatsu-shi, Fukushima-ken 965-0041; Japan
- Coordinates: 37°30′30″N 139°55′48″E
- Operator: JR East; Aizu Railway; JR Freight
- Lines: ■ Ban'etsu West Line; ■ Tadami Line; ■ Aizu Line
- Platforms: 2 bay + 1 side + 1 island platform
- Tracks: 5

Other information
- Status: Staffed (Midori no Madoguchi )
- Website: Official website

History
- Opened: July 15, 1899
- Former names: Wakamatsu (until 1917)

Passengers
- FY2023: 2,164 daily

Services
Preceding station	JR East	Following station
Shiokawa towards Kitakata	Ban'etsu West Line Rapid	Hirota towards Kōriyama
Shiokawa towards Niitsu	Ban'etsu West Line Rapid Agano	Terminus
Dōjima towards Niitsu	Ban'etsu West Line Local	Hirota towards Kōriyama
Nanukamachi towards Koide	Tadami Line	Terminus
Preceding station	Aizu Railway	Following station
Nanukamachi towards Aizu-Tajima	Aizu Line Rapid Relay	Terminus
Nanukamachi towards Aizukōgen-Ozeguchi	Aizu Line Local	Terminus
Location
- Location within Fukushima Prefecture Location within Japan

Main Entrance

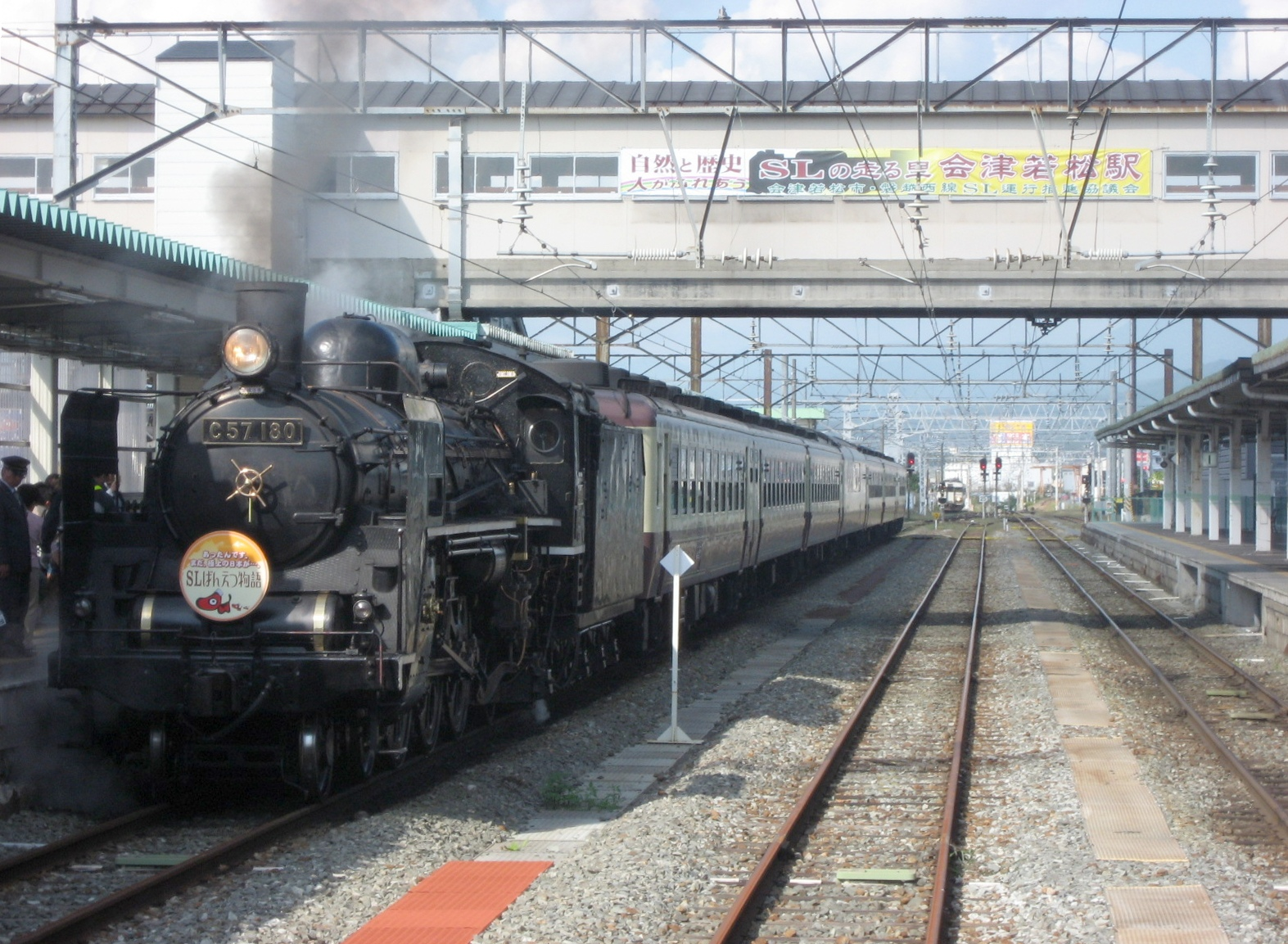
SL Banetsu Monogatari at Platform 2

Aizu-Wakamatsu Station (会津若松駅, Aizu-wakamatsu-eki) is a railway station in the city of Aizuwakamatsu, in Fukushima Prefecture, Japan. It is the main station for Aizu-Wakamatsu and surrounding areas. The station also has a freight terminal operated by Japan Freight Railway Company (JR Freight).

== Lines ==
Aizu-Wakamatsu Station is served by the East Japan Railway Company (JR East) Banetsu West Line and is 64.6 kilometers from the terminus of that line at Kōriyama. It is also the terminal station from the JR East Tadami Line. Most trains of the Aizu Railway Aizu Line, which officially terminates at Nishi-Wakamatsu, continue on to Aizu-Wakamatsu Station using the JR East tracks.

== Station layout ==
In the forecourt of the station there is a bus terminal, taxi rank and car park. The station building, located on the eastern side of the tracks, contains a gift shop (including bento and souvenirs), travel agency (View Plaza), and Midori no Madoguchi staffed ticket office. Aizu-Wakamatsu Station has five platforms. Platform 1 and 2 are bay platforms. Platform 1 is immediately inside the ticket gate and most trains to Koriyama depart from here. Moving westward there is a storage track then platforms 2 and 3. The tracks at platform 1 and 2 are a dead end and an overhead walkway at the end connects platforms 2/3 to platform 1 and the rest of the station. Platforms 4 and 5 are accessed via a footbridge.

=== Platforms ===
1	■ Banetsu West Line	for Bandaimachi, Inawashiro, and Koriyama for Kitakata
2	■ Banetsu West Line	for Bandaimachi, Inawashiro, and Koriyama for Kitakata, Tsugawa, Niitsu, and Niigata
3	■ Banetsu West Line	for Kitakata, Tsugawa, Niitsu, and Niigata
3	■ Tadami Line	for Aizu-Bange, Tadami, and Koide
4	■ Tadami Line	for Aizu-Bange, Tadami, and Koide
5	■ Aizu Line	for Aizu-Tajima and Aizukōgen-Ozeguchi

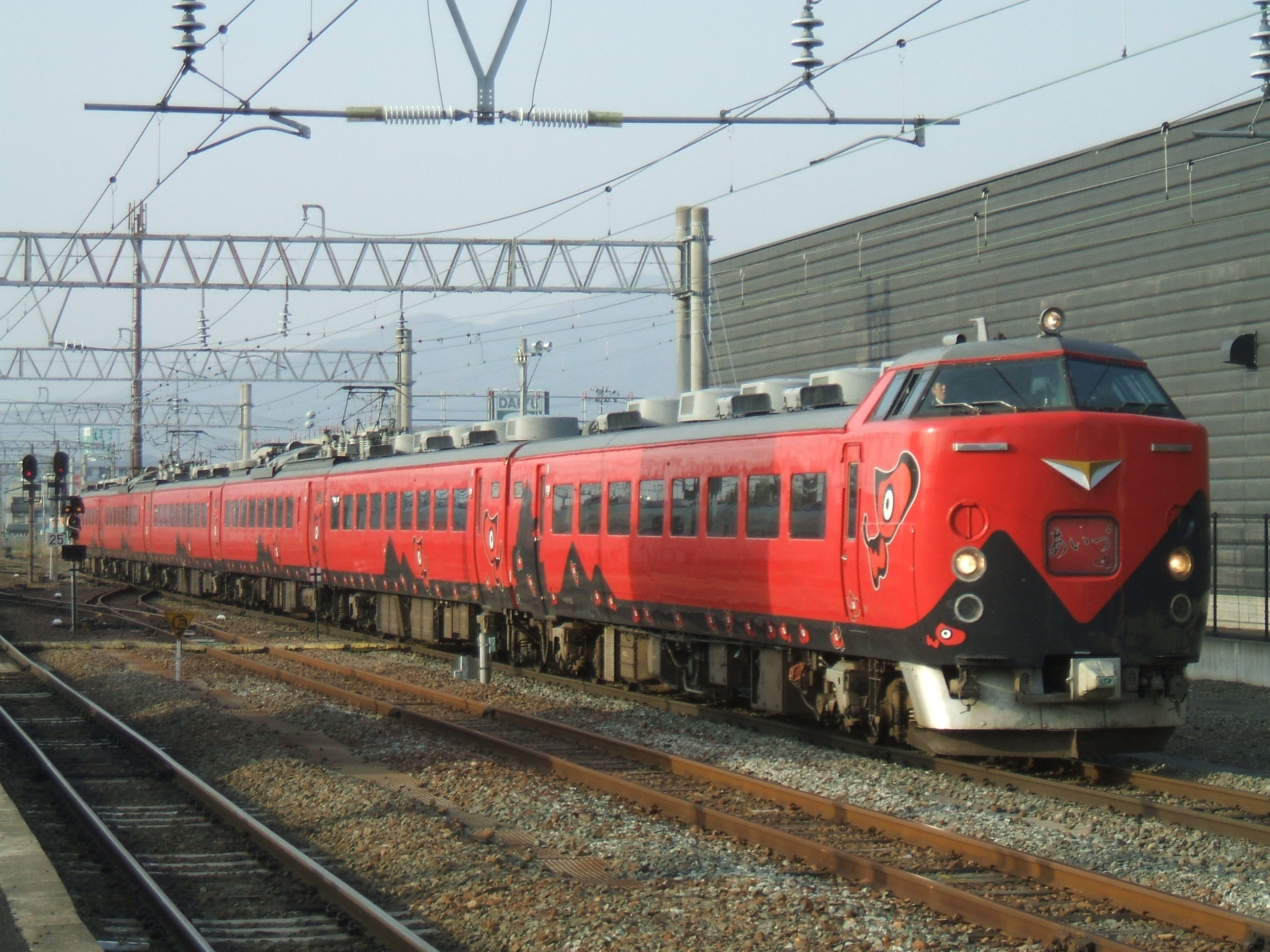
Aizu Liner Rapid service, May 2010

== History ==
The station opened as part of the Ganetsu Railway on July 15, 1899, with the name Wakamatsu Station (若松駅). On May 21, 1917, the station was renamed to Aizu-Wakamatsu Station in order to distinguish it from Wakamatsu Station in Fukuoka Prefecture. The station was absorbed into the JR East network upon the privatization of the Japanese National Railways (JNR) on April 1, 1987.

== Passenger statistics ==
In fiscal year 2023, the JR portion of the station was used by an average of 2164 passengers daily (boarding passengers only). The passenger figures for previous years are as shown below.

Fiscal year	Daily average
2000	3,595
2005	2,996
2010	2,766
2015	2,781
2020	1,747

== Webcam ==
There was a webcam installed by NTT East on the walkway between platforms 1 and 2/3. This gave a view of trains using platforms 1 and 2. The camera provided both video and sound using a 512 kbit/s stream. The webcam was discontinued as of March 31, 2017.

== Surrounding area ==
- Aizuwakamatsu Fire Station
- Aizu Bus Ekimae Terminal
- National Route 118

== Bus terminal ==
=== Station Square ===
Route buses

Bus stop	No	Via	destination	Company	Note
1	Ecoron	circular-route	Aizu Wakamatsu Station	Hirota Taxi	
1	Chuō Hospital・Iai Danchi Line	University of Aizu	Iai Danchi East Gate	Aizu Bus	
1	Sengoku・Shinmei Line	Shimei・Sengoku	Aizu Wakamatsu	Aizu Bus	This route was originally Machinaka circular-route Line until 2019

Bus stop	No	Via	destination	Company	Note
2	Kanebori Line	Takizawa Myokokuji-Temple Iriguchi	Kanebori	Aizu Bus	
2	Matsunaga Danchi・Nishiwakamatsu Line	Tsuruga Castle	Nishi Wakamatsu Station	Aizu Bus	
2	Jinai Kōkō Line		Jinai kōkō	Aizu Bus	

Bus stop	No	Via	destination	Company	Note
3	Yonedai-Nichōme・Nishiwakamatsu Line		Nishi wakamatsu	Aizu Bus	

Bus stop	No	Via	destination	Company	Note
4	Haikara-san Line	Iimori Hill→Nanukamachi Station (circular-route)	Aizu Wakamatsu	Aizu Bus	
4	Akabē Line	Nanukamachi Station→Iimori Hill (circular-route)	Aizu Wakamatsu	Aizu Bus	

=== in front of the Station Bus stop ===
Route buses

Bus stop	No	Via	destination	Company	Note
	Ngaino Line	Nishi Wakamatsu Station・Tsuruga Castle・Aizu-Takada Station	Nagaino	Aizu Bus	
	Hongō Line	Nishi Wakamatsu Station	Hongō Shako	Aizu Bus	
	Oikawa Line	Tsuruga Castle	Oikawa Station	Aizu Bus	
	Kita-aizu・Nītsuru Line		Kita-Aizu Shisyo	Aizu Bus	
	Kita-aizu・Nītsuru Line	Niitsuru Station	Nītsuru Onsen	Aizu Bus	
	MatsunagaDanchi・Ashinomaki Line	Monden Station・Ashinomaki-Onsen Station	Ashinomaki Shako	Aizu Bus	
	Yonedai・Kōtō Line	Hirota Station	Shima (Oikawa Station East)	Aizu Bus	
	Bange Line	Nanukamachi Station・Aizu-Bange Station	Bange Office	Aizu Bus	
	Minato Line	Hirota Station	Takasaka (Lake Inawashiro)	Aizu Bus	
	Kumakura・Kitakata Line	Hirota Station	Kitakata Station	Aizu Bus	
	Shiokawa・Kitakata Line	Shiokawa Station	Kitakata Station	Aizu Bus	
	Shirakawa-Aizu Wakamatsu Line	Ōuchi-juku・Aizu-Shimogō Station・Shin-Shirakawa Station	Shirakawa Station	Fukushima Transportation	Runs only during Summer and Autumn(April–November)

Highway buses

Bus stop	No	Via	destination	Company	Note
	Yume Kaidō Aizu	Oji Station・Ikebukuro Station	Shinjuku Station	Aizu Bus	
	Yume Kaidō Aizu	Oji Station	Tokyo Station	Aizu Bus	
	Yume Kaidō Aizu (Night bus)	Oji Station・Ikebukuro Station・Shinjuku Station・Tokyo Station	Tokyo Disney Resort	Aizu Bus・Chiba Kōtsū	
	AizuWakamatsu-Kōriyama-Iwaki Line	Kōriyama Station・Iwaki Station	Spa Resort Hawaiians	Aizu Bus	
	Fukushima・Sendai Airport Line	Kōriyama Station・Nihonmatsu・Fukushima Station	Fukushima Race Course	Aizu Bus	
	Fukushima・Sendai Airport Line	Kōriyama Station	Sendai Airport	Aizu Bus	
	Sendai Line		Sendai Station	Aizu Bus	extend this line to Rakuten Seimei Park Miyagi bus stop on holding baseball game
	Niigata Line	Niigata Station	Bandai City Bus Center/Niigata Airport	Aizu Bus	
	Niigata Line		Nozawa Station	Aizu Bus	

=== Eki-mae Happy Parking Bus stop ===
No	Via	destination	Company	Note
Aizu Line (Night bus)	Ōmiya Station・Tokyo Station	Futamata-Shinmachi Station	Sakura Kōtsū	

== See also ==
- List of railway stations in Japan
