= November 1914 =

Month of 1914

<<	November 1914					>>
Su	Mo	Tu	We	Th	Fr	Sa
1	2	3	4	5	6	7
8	9	10	11	12	13	14
15	16	17	18	19	20	21
22	23	24	25	26	27	28
29	30

The following events occurred in November 1914:

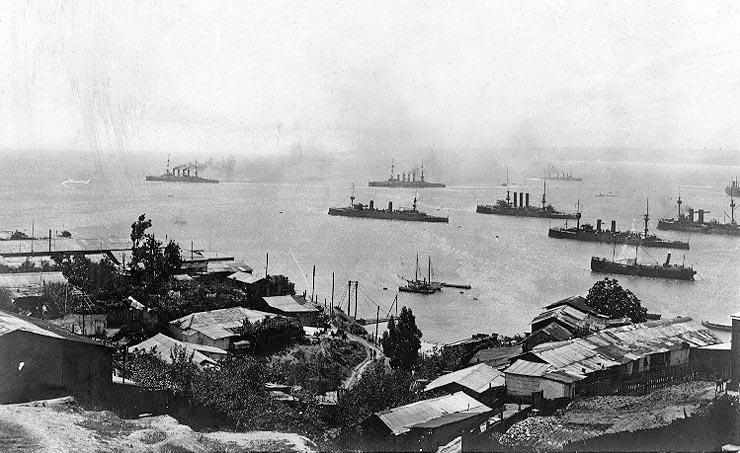
Imperial German Navy squadron leaving Valparaíso, Chile, following the Battle of Coronel.

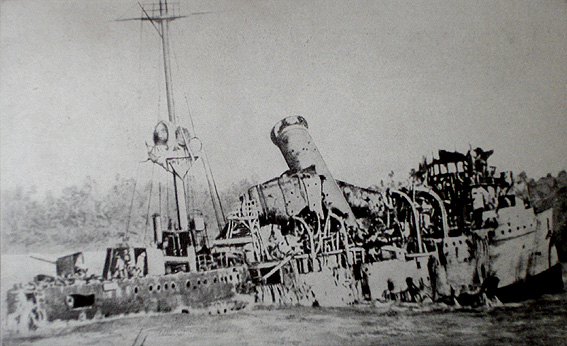
German cruiser SMS Emden beached after Battle of Cocos.

== November 1, 1914 (Sunday) ==
- The Ottoman Empire officially entered World War I after Russia declared war on the Empire for bombarding its Black Sea ports.
- Battle of Coronel — The Royal Navy suffered its first defeat of World War I, after a British squadron commanded by Rear-Admiral Sir Christopher Cradock met and was defeated by superior German forces led by Vice-Admiral Maximilian von Spee in the eastern Pacific. Cradock perished in the battle, along with 1,570 sailors, when both HMS Good Hope and HMS Monmouth were sunk.
- The 38 ships carrying the New Zealand Expeditionary Force (10 ships) and the First Australian Imperial Force (28 ships) left Perth. Originally expected to sail to Great Britain, the orders were changed to have the Commonwealth forces land in Egypt to assist in protecting the Suez Canal from the Ottoman Empire.
- Battle of Messines — German forces captured Wytschate from the British and secured Messines in west Belgium, officially putting an end to the battle.
- Battle of Armentières — Fighting continued south of the Lys River in France while French cavalry were forced out of Messines, exposing the northern flank of the main French fighting force. A new reserve line was formed between the French towns of Fleurbaix and Nieppe, and artillery rations were doubled to help maintain the line from German attacks.
- Cuba held mid-term parliamentary elections to fill up half the seats in the House of Representatives and a single seat in the Senate. The National Party of Cuba won the most seats, with 22 of the 49 House seats and the single Senate seat.
- The Ban'etsu and Uetse rail lines opened in Niigata Prefecture, Japan, with stations Iwafunemachi, Hirakida, Ogino, Kami-Nojiri, Tokusawa, Toyomi, Hideya, Kanose, Murakami, and Sakamachi serving the railroads.
- Pope Benedict XV delivered his encyclical letter Ad beatissimi Apostolorum at St. Peter's Basilica in the Vatican during the Feast of All Saints. As the letter had been written near the start of World War I, it was labelled "the Suicide of Civilized Europe".
- The Saint Justin Theology Seminary was established in Daegu, South Korea, eventually expanding into a series of colleges before officially obtaining university status as the Catholic University of Daegu in 1980.
- Irish opera singer John McCormack recorded the popular British music hall song "It's a Long Way to Tipperary", written by Jack Judge. The song was a popular marching tune among British soldiers and the recording only further made the song synonymous with music associated with World War I.
- Archbishop Libert H. Boeynaems dedicated the opening of Sacred Heart Church-Punahou in Honolulu.
- The Mexican Pentecostal denomination Iglesia Apostólica de la Fe en Cristo Jesús was established in Villa Aldama, Chihuahua, Mexico.
- The association football club Taubaté was formed in Taubaté, São Paulo, Brazil after three local football fans met and came up with the idea to bring a club to the city.

== November 2, 1914 (Monday) ==
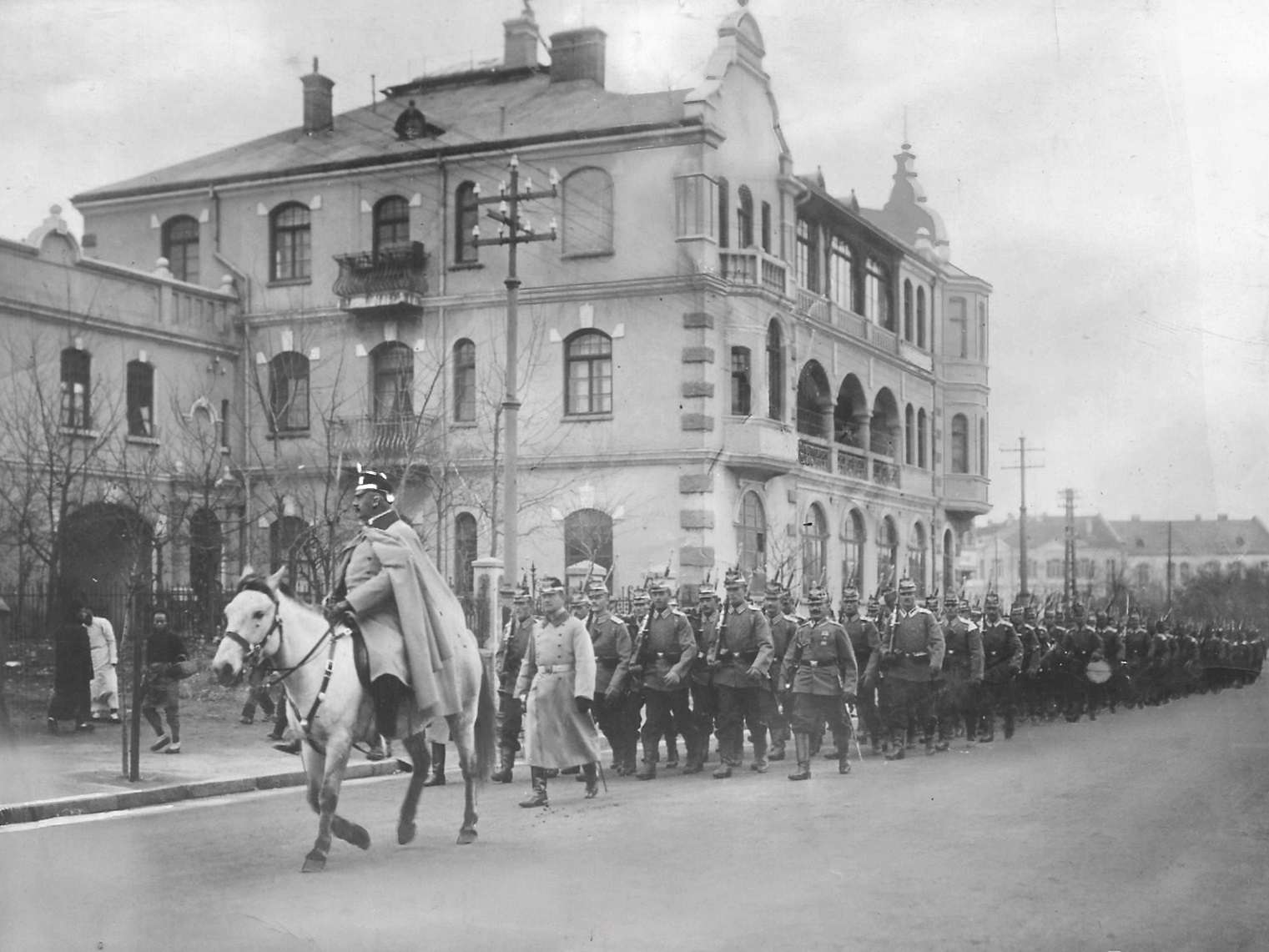
German troops defending the German colonial port during the Siege of Tsingtao in China.

- Bergmann Offensive — Russian forces under the command of General Georgy Bergmann entered the Ottoman Empire through the Caucasus to secure Eleşkirt, a strategic valley in northeastern Turkey, in what was the first major initiative in the Caucasus campaign.
- Battle of Armentières — The battle officially ended although fighting continued north of the Lys River. German forces lost nearly twice as many men as the French, with 11,300 casualties compared to 5,700.
- Battle of La Bassée — Allied reserve battalions dug in at Bailleul, France while engineers built more field fortifications, officially ending the battle. The Allies sustained around 15,000 casualties, while best estimates from the German side were 6,000 (although accounts were incomplete).
- Battle of Tanga — Soldiers with the British Indian Expeditionary Force landed at the port city of Tanga, Tanzania.
- Siege of Tsingtao — With defeat looking more imminent, the Central Powers began scuttling naval ships in Chinese port, starting with the SMS Kaiserin Elisabeth of the Austro-Hungarian Navy.
- The 107th Brigade of the British Army was established using members of the Ulster Volunteers.
- The Royal Montreal Regiment of the Canadian Army was established.
- An addition to the Halle Building in Cleveland was completed, increasing the size of the building to 425,000 square feet (39,500 m^{2}).
- The Star Crossing rail station opened in Flintshire, Wales.
- Born:
  - Rogelio Julio Frigerio, Argentine economist, noted proponent of developmentalism; in Buenos Aires, Argentina (d. 2006)
  - Ray Walston, American actor, best known for his TV roles in My Favorite Martian and Picket Fences; as Herman Ray Waltson, in Laurel, Mississippi, United States (d. 2001)
  - Brooks Holder, American baseball player, second baseman and outfielder for the Pacific Coast League including the San Francisco Seals, Hollywood Stars and Oakland Oaks from 1935 to 1951; as Richard Brooks Holder, in Rising Star, Texas, United States (d. 1986)
  - Johnny Vander Meer, American baseball player, pitcher for the Cincinnati Reds from 1937 to 1943 and 1946 to 1949; as John Vander Meer, in Prospect Park, New Jersey, United States (d. 1997)
- Died:
  - Heinrich Burkhardt, 53, German mathematician, developed the Burkhardt quartic and one of the examiners of Albert Einstein's thesis on relativity; died from a stomach disease (b. 1861)
  - Jack Sheridan, 52, American baseball umpire, officiated for Major League Baseball from 1890 to 1914; died from a heart attack (b. 1862)

== November 3, 1914 (Tuesday) ==
- The United States general elections were held to elect members for the 64th United States Congress. The Democratic Party retained control of both houses of Congress, the first time since the Civil War. The United States House of Representatives had 230 seats go to the Democrats while the Republican Party gained 196 (with 6 going to independents). It was also the first time American voters could elect candidates to the U.S. Senate with the ratification of the Seventeenth Amendment, resulting in 51 seats for the Democrats and 44 seats for the Republicans.
- State elections were held in the United States with the following results:
  - Democrat Charles Henderson was elected to become the 35th Governor of Alabama with 83% of the vote.
  - Democrat incumbent George W. P. Hunt retained his seat as Governor of Arizona with nearly half of the vote in a three-way race.
  - Hiram Johnson was re-elected Governor of California under the Progressive Party ticker, beating Republican rival John D. Fredericks close to 50% of the vote.
  - Democrat incumbent David I. Walsh defeated Republican challenger Samuel W. McCall with 45% of the vote to retain his seat as Governor of Massachusetts.
  - Democrat Winfield Scott Hammond defeated Republican challenger William E. Lee with 45% to 41% of the vote in become Governor of Minnesota but would pass away barely a year into his office.
  - Republican Charles Seymour Whitman defeated Democrat incumbent Martin H. Glynn for Governor of New York by just over 145,000 votes.
  - Democrat Robert L. Williams was elected Governor of Oklahoma after winning nearly 40% of the vote in a three-way race.
  - Republican James Withycombe was elected the 15th Governor of Oregon after winning nearly 49% of the vote.
  - Republican Martin Grove Brumbaugh defeated Democrat Vance C. McCormick with 52% of the vote to become the 26th Governor of Pennsylvania.
  - Democrat Richard Irvine Manning III was elected overwhelmingly as Governor of South Carolina.
  - Republican Charles W. Gates defeated Democrat Harland Bradley Howe with nearly 60% of the vote to become 55th Governor of Vermont.
  - Republican Emanuel L. Philipp defeated Democrat John C. Karel with 43% of the vote to become the 23rd Governor of Wisconsin.
  - Democrat John B. Kendrick was elected 9th Governor of Wyoming with 51% of the vote.
- Montenegro declared war on the Ottoman Empire.
- First Battle of Ypres — German forces lost an estimated 17,250 men after five days of fighting and were quickly becoming outnumbered as fresh troops from the British Expeditionary Force arrived for battle. The new pressure on the front line delayed the German Army's plans to attack using the west Belgium towns of Messines and Langemark.
- Raid on Yarmouth — The Imperial German Navy attacked the British North Sea port of Great Yarmouth after sea patrols surprised a mine-laying operation at the mouth of the port.The German navy lost their battle cruiser SMS Yorck when it struck two of the mines their patrol laid down, killing somewhere between 235 and 336 sailors (reports varied). The British lost a submarine (HMS D5) when it struck a mine going out to meet the German fleet, killing 25 sailors.
- In retaliation for the Ottoman Empire letting the German battlecruiser SMS Goeben and the light cruiser SMS Breslau through the Dardanelles in August and later using them to bombard Russian ports in late October, First Lord of the Admiralty Winston Churchill ordered Royal Navy battlecruisers HMS Indomitable and HMS Indefatigable to bombard Turkish defenses around the straits, killing 86 Ottoman troops and displacing 10 guns.
- Battle of Tanga — Most of the British Indian forces landed in Tanga harbor and began their march on the Tanzanian city the next day.
- Battle of Kilimanjaro — An Indian Expeditionary Force of 1,500 clashed with German colonial troops at the famous mountain in German East Africa. Despite having a force strength half the size of the British, the Germans were victorious. The British force lost 312 men while the Germans lost 109.
- Battle of Rufiji Delta — British ships bombarded the German cruiser SMS Königsberg and its sister ship SMS Somali as they sat barricaded in the mouth of Rufiji River in German East Africa (now Tanzania), but the thick jungles surrounding the river concealed the ship and prevented any accurate hits.
- The East Asia Squadron of the Imperial German Navy entered Valparaíso harbor in Chile and were welcomed as heroes by the German population for their victory over the Royal Navy at the Battle of Coronel two days earlier. Admiral Maximilian von Spee refused to join in the celebration, knowing the victory only stacked the odds against his squadron for surviving another campaign against the Royal Navy. When presented with a bunch of flowers, Von Spee was said to have commented, "these will do nicely for my grave". His words were prophetic, as Von Spee and many of his squadron would die at the Battle of the Falkland Islands just over a month later.
- The German army command Army Detachment Woyrsch was formed to serve the Eastern Front.
- American fashion innovator Caresse Crosby received her patent to develop the "backless brassiere."
- Evans County, Georgia, was established with the county seat in Claxton. It was named after state senator Clement A. Evans.
- Born:
  - John T. Connor, American civil servant, served as 16th United States Secretary of Commerce from 1965 to 1967; in Syracuse, New York, United States (d. 2000)
  - Tidye Pickett, American athlete, first African-American woman to compete in the Olympic Games (1936 Summer Olympics); in Chicago, United States (d. 1986)
- Died:
  - Samuel Archer King, 86, American aviator, pioneer in ballooning (b. 1828)
  - Georg Trakl, 27, Austrian poet, brother to pianist Grete Trakl, best known for the poem "Grodek"; died from a cocaine overdose (b. 1887)

== November 4, 1914 (Wednesday) ==
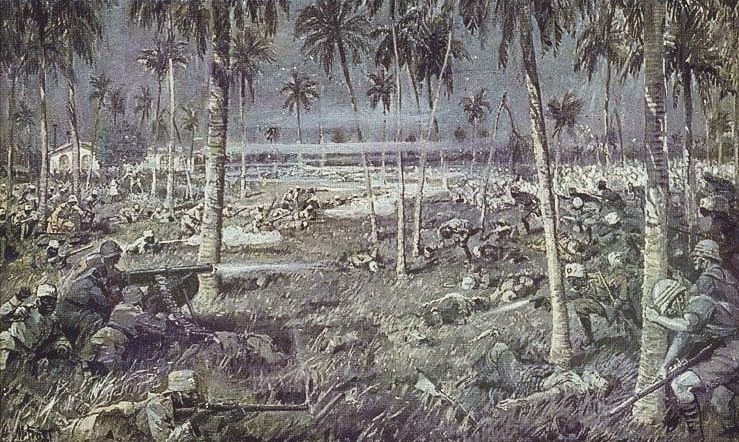
British Indian soldiers clash with German troops at the Battle of Tanga in German East Africa. Painting by Martin Frost.

- Battle of Tanga — British Indian and German colonial soldiers clashed in the streets and jungles around Tanga, Tanzania. Despite a company of Gurkhas capturing key buildings in the city, the Germans were able to stop most of the advance. In one of the battle's more odd episodes, a large beehive was disturbed and a swarm attacked and broke up a major British infantry regiment while causing a defending force to scatter, leading to the nickname "Battle of the Bees." After several more hours of brutal street fighting, disorganization and mounting casualties forced the British to withdraw, despite outnumbering German defenders eight to one. British forces in all lost 360 men, had 487 wounded and 148 missing. German defenders lost 70 men and 76 wounded.
- The German cruiser SMS Karlsruhe sank near Barbados after an internal explosion tore the vessel in half, killing 133 of its 373 crew, including its captain Erich Köhler. The stern of the ship stayed afloat long enough for the 140 survivors to board a pair of colliers attending the ship. After the second one was scuttled, the remaining ship slipped through a Royal Navy blockade formed to hunt SMS Karlsruhe for sinking or capturing 15 British merchant ships and damaging the British cruiser HMS Bristol on August 6. As a result, Germany kept the sinking secret until British intelligence learned of the ship's fate in March 1915.
- Siege of Mora – An Allied artillery bombardment initially forced defending German colonial forces to abandon the northern side of the mountain near Mora, German Cameroon but a counterattack retook the position.
- U.S. states Arizona, Colorado, Oregon and Washington voted in favor of prohibition while California and Ohio voted in favor of legal alcohol sales.
- The British Army established the 170th, 171st, and 176th Brigades to serve on the Western Front with the Territorial Force.
- Royal Navy battleship Valiant was launched by the Fairfield Shipbuilding and Engineering Company in Glasgow.
- Royal Navy battleship HMS Hood was scuttled in Portland Harbour in southern England to act as blockship for the port's southern entrance, but remained on ship sales list until 1917.
- Born:
  - Carlos Castillo Armas, Guatemalan state leader, 28th President of Guatemala; in Santa Lucía Cotzumalguapa, Guatemala (assassinated, 1957)
  - Gustav Francsi, German air force officer, commander of Nachtjagdgeschwader 100 for the Luftwaffe during World War II, recipient of the Knight's Cross of the Iron Cross; as Gustav-Eduard Fransci, in Gierswalde, German Empire (present-day Uslar, Germany) (d. 1961)
- Died: F. Augustus Heinze, 44, American mining industrialist, one of the three Copper Kings that developed mining around Butte, Montana; died from hemorrhage of the stomach caused by cirrhosis of the liver (b. 1869)

== November 5, 1914 (Thursday) ==
- The United Kingdom and France declared war on the Ottoman Empire.
- The British government established the Sultanate of Egypt in place of the khedivate formerly under the Ottoman Empire.
- The United Kingdom annexed Cyprus, which it controlled until 1960.
- Italian Prime Minister Antonio Salandra reformed his cabinet for a second term.
- A court martial against British Admiral Ernest Troubridge, who had commanded the British Mediterranean Fleet that pursued and failed to capture the German battleships SMS Goeben and SMS Breslau before they reached Turkey, was held on board HMS Bulwark moored at the Isle of Portland. Troubridge faced charges of failing to engage the enemy, especially since the German ships helped strengthen the Empire's naval fleet and emboldened them to join the Central Powers in World War I.
- The British 57th Division was established for the Territorial Force.
- With Italy continuing to declare its neutrality during the first year of World War I, Italian volunteer soldiers with the French Foreign Legion formed the 4th Marching Regiment of the 1st Foreign Regiment, more popularly known as the Garibaldi Legion, to fight the Germans.
- The Bangalore Brigade and the Imperial Service Infantry Brigade of the British Indian Army were disbanded.
- The Rural Municipality of Lawrence in the Canadian province of Manitoba was incorporated. It was amalgamated with the Rural Municipality of Ochre River to form the Rural Municipality of Lakeshore on January 1, 2015.
- Alpha Phi Delta was founded as a Greek social fraternity at Syracuse University, New York.
- The university student newspaper The Manitoban was first published at the University of Manitoba in Winnipeg, and remains one of the oldest and largest post-secondary newspapers in Canada. Noted contributors to the papers included Marshall McLuhan, Izzy Asper and Andrew Coyne.
- Born: Herbert Czaja, German politician, member of Bundestag (Parliament of West Germany) from 1953 to 1990, and President of the Federation of Expellees from 1970 to 1994; in Teschen, Austria-Hungary (present-day Cieszyn, Poland) (d. 1997)
- Died: August Weismann, 80, German evolutionary biologist, developed the germ plasm theory (b. 1834)

== November 6, 1914 (Friday) ==
- Eulalio Gutiérrez was declared President of Mexico during the Convention of Aguascalientes.
- Siege of Tsingtao — The Japanese softened Germany's defenses with a week of bombardment until German ammunition had run out. Japanese infantry then stormed the German trenches and forced them to surrender the following day.
- Bergmann Offensive — Russian forces made contact with Ottoman troops in the Caucasus region and fighting began over the next three days.
- Fao Landing — Divisions of the British Indian Army landed on Fao beach on the southern coast of Iraq while under heavy fire from the fortress. It was the only seaside fortress the Ottoman Empire had to threaten Allied shipping convoys in the Persian Gulf.
- Irish politician and army officer Arthur O'Neill was killed in action while commanding the 2nd Life Guards regiment at Zillebeke, Belgium. He was the first Member of Parliament to be killed in World War I.
- German spy Carl Hans Lody was executed by firing squad in the Tower of London, the first such execution to be held there in 167 years. He was the only captured German spy to be put on public trial in Great Britain in World War I.
- Irish aviation pioneer Francis Annesley disappeared after taking off with pilot Flight Lieutenant C.F. Beevor from an airfield at Eastchurch, England in a Bristol airplane bound for France. He and Beevor were officially declared dead on December 2 after two German prisoners of war testified a plane matching the description of the missing aircraft had been shot down over Dixmude, Belgium.
- American biologist Jacques Loeb published a paper on artificial parthenogenesis in sea urchins. His paper provided experimental evidence that it was possible to cause the eggs of sea urchins to begin embryonic development without sperm by slightly modifying the chemical composition of the water in which the eggs were kept.
- Born: Jonathan Harris, American actor, best known as Dr. Zachary Smith in 1960s science fiction TV series Lost in Space; as Johnathan Daniel Charasuchin, in New York City, United States (d. 2002)

== November 7, 1914 (Saturday) ==
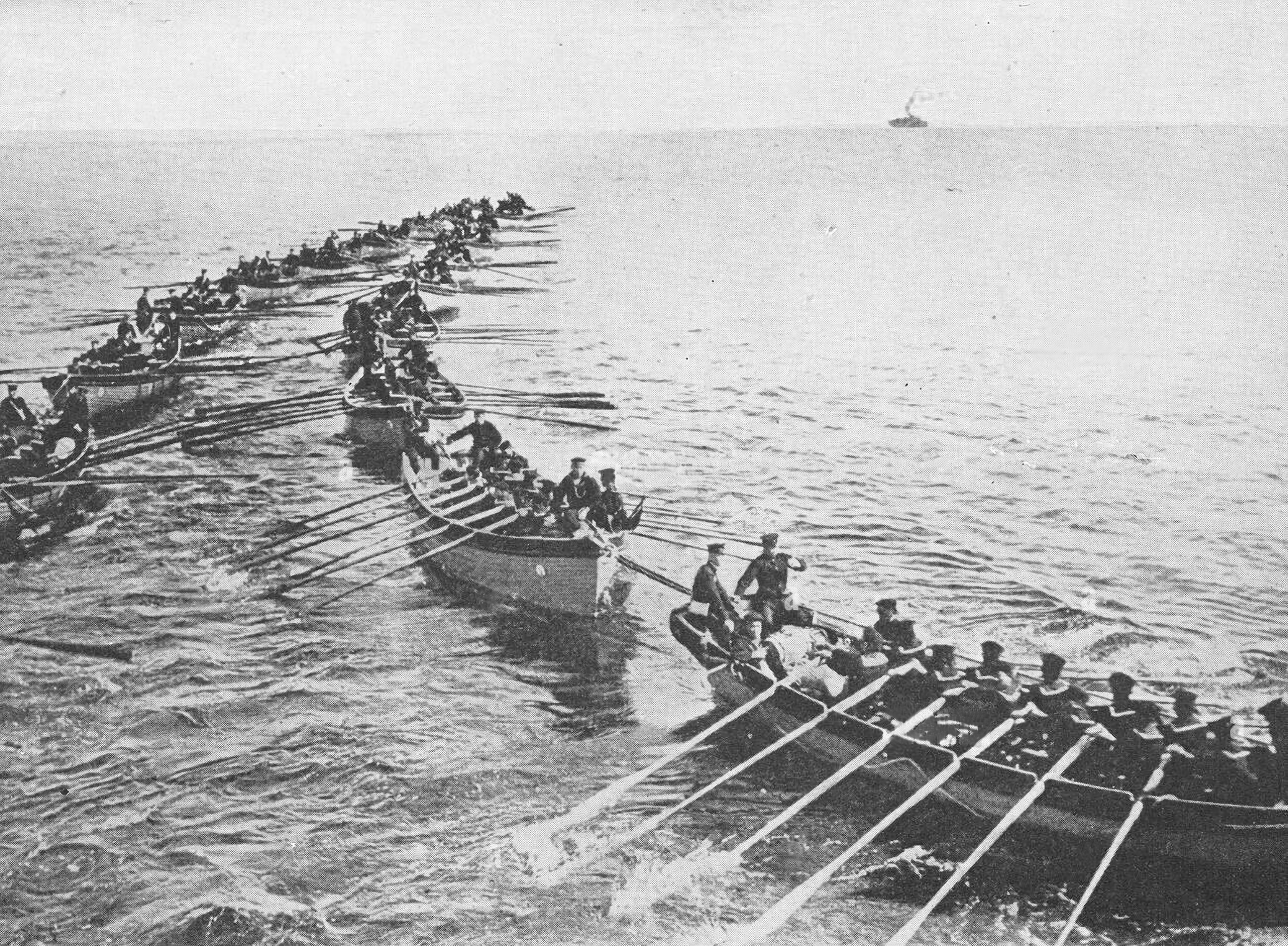
Japanese troops coming ashore near the German colonial port of Tsingtao, China.

- Siege of Tsingtao — The Japanese and British seized Jiaozhou Bay in China, the base of the German East Asia Squadron. The last of the German fleet still in the port were scuttled, including gunship SMS Jaguar.
- The 2nd, 18th, 19th, 21st, 22nd, 28th, 29th, 31st, 47th, 49th, and 50th Battalions of the Canadian Expeditionary Force were established.
- The first issue of The New Republic was published in the United States. The first sentences of the opening article in the first issue simply stated: "The New Republic is frankly an experiment. It is an attempt to find national audience for a journal of interpretation and opinion."
- The weekly newspaper The Transcontinental was first published in Port Augusta, Australia.
- The film series The Hazards of Helen premiered, starring Helen Holmes as the resourceful heroine, who also did most of her own stunt work.
- The planet Mercury visibly crossed the face of the sun, starting at 09:57 UTC and ending 14:09 UTC.

== November 8, 1914 (Sunday) ==
- Fao Landing — Soldiers with the British Indian Army captured the seaside fortress overlooking Fao beach in Iraq using the newly arrived British artillery to breach the walls. The capture of the fort, along with 300 prisoners, ensured the Ottoman Empire could not threaten Allied shipping in the Persian Gulf.
- The German light cruiser SMS Emden arrived at the Australian-held Cocos Islands in the Indian Ocean on a mission to disable a wireless and cable transmission station. However, the station was able to send out a distress signal before it was taken out, alerting the Australian command ship HMAS Melbourne which ordered HMAS Sydney to investigate.
- The Oga Line was extended to Wakimoto, Akita Prefecture, Japan, with stations Funakoshi and Wakimoto serving the rail line.
- The first Mass was celebrated in the new Cathedral of Saint Helena in Helena, Montana.
- Born:
  - George Dantzig, American mathematician, developer of the simplex algorithm for computer sciences; in Portland, Oregon, United States (d. 2005)
  - Norman Lloyd, American actor and film director, producer of the TV series Alfred Hitchcock Presents, best known for the role of Dr. Daniel Auschlander on the 1980s television medical drama St. Elsewhere, husband of Peggy Lloyd; as Norman Nathan Perlmutter, in Jersey City, New Jersey, United States (d. 2021)
  - Jackie Brown, Irish association football player, played for both of Ireland's national football teams in the 1930s; as John Brown, in Belfast, Ireland (present-day Northern Ireland) (d. 1990)

== November 9, 1914 (Monday) ==
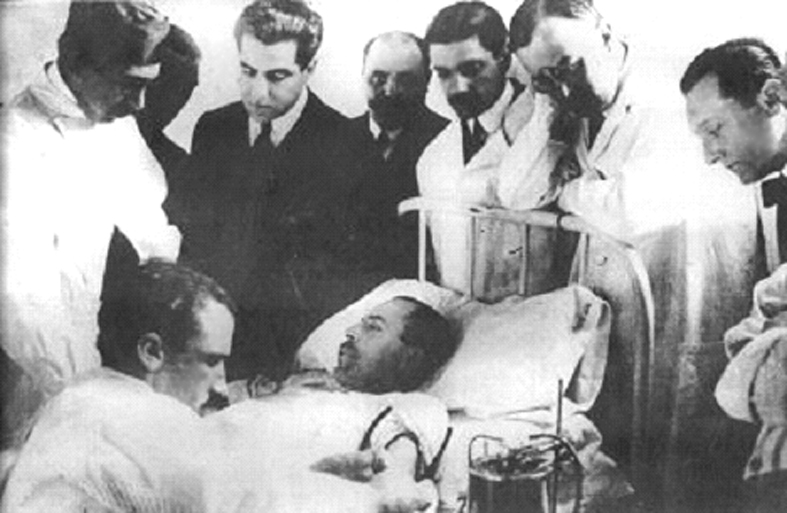
Dr. Luis Agote (second from right) overseeing one of the first safe and effective blood transfusion

- Battle of Cocos — Australian cruiser HMAS Sydney spotted and disabled the German cruiser SMS Emden, the last active warship of the Central Powers in the Indian Ocean, with 133 sailors out of the 345 crew killed. A German landing party of 50 sent to destroy the wireless station witnessed the battle from the shore and realized it did not have enough men to hold the island. Instead, it commandeered a schooner and set course for Padang in the neutral Dutch East Indies.
- First Battle of Ypres — German armies attacked the French and Belgian forces between Langemark and Dixmude and forced them back to the Yser River, where the Belgians blew up the crossings.
- British Admiral Ernest Troubridge was acquitted of the charge of failing to engage an enemy after the court-martial concluded the Admiralty of the Royal Navy was responsible for failing to communicate its orders to the admiral properly and delaying the Mediterranean Fleet's chances of intercepting a pair of German battleships from reaching Turkey.
- Physician Luis Agote performed a non-direct blood transfusion using sodium citrate as an anticoagulant in Buenos Aires, the second successful procedure after physician Albert Hustin performed a transfusion in Brussels on March 27, 1914.
- Born:
  - Colin Falkland Gray, New Zealand air force officer, commander of the No. 616, No. 64, and No. 81 Squadrons during World War II, recipient of the Distinguished Service Order and Distinguished Flying Cross; in Christchurch, New Zealand (d. 1995)
  - Hedy Lamarr, Austrian-born American actress, best known for the controversial role in Ecstasy, and co-inventor (with George Antheil) of the frequency-hopping spread spectrum (FHSS) for radio communication; as Hedwig Eva Maria Kiesler, in Vienna, Austria-Hungary (present-day Austria) (d. 2000)
- Died:
  - Jean-Baptiste Faure, 84, French opera singer, famous for his baritone roles in Opéra-Comique, Paris Opera and the Royal Opera House (b. 1830)
  - Sattar Khan, 48, Iranian rebel leader, key leader of the Persian Constitutional Revolution from 1907 to 1910 (b. 1866)

== November 10, 1914 (Tuesday) ==
- First Battle of Ypres — German armies launched a new offensive in west Belgium from the forest Nonne Bosschen (Nun's Copse) that ran from Langemark and Dixmude in what historians referred to as the Battle of Nonne Bosschen.
- Battle of Rufiji Delta — The Royal Navy sank a blockship across one of the openings in the Rufiji Delta in German East Africa to reduce the number of escape routes the German cruiser SMS Königsberg could use to escape the blockade.
- Battle of Cocos — The Australian cruiser HMAS Sydney commenced rescue of the surviving sailors on the beached SMS Emden after learning the German landing party on the islands had escaped in a schooner.
- U.S. President Woodrow Wilson officially opened the Houston Ship Channel in Houston, although steamship services had been established since June 14.
- Born: Moshe Wolman, Polish-Israeli medical researcher, leading researcher of biochemistry and the first to diagnose the genetic disorder Wolman disease; in Warsaw, Congress Poland (present-day Poland) (d. 2009)
- Died:
  - Samuel Thomas Hauser, 81, American politician, 7th Governor of the Montana Territory from 1885 to 1887 (b. 1833)
  - Isaac T. Stoddard, 63, American industrialist and public servant, chief developer of the mining industry in Yavapai County, Arizona, 12th Secretary of the Arizona Territory; died from apoplexy (b. 1851)

== November 11, 1914 (Wednesday) ==
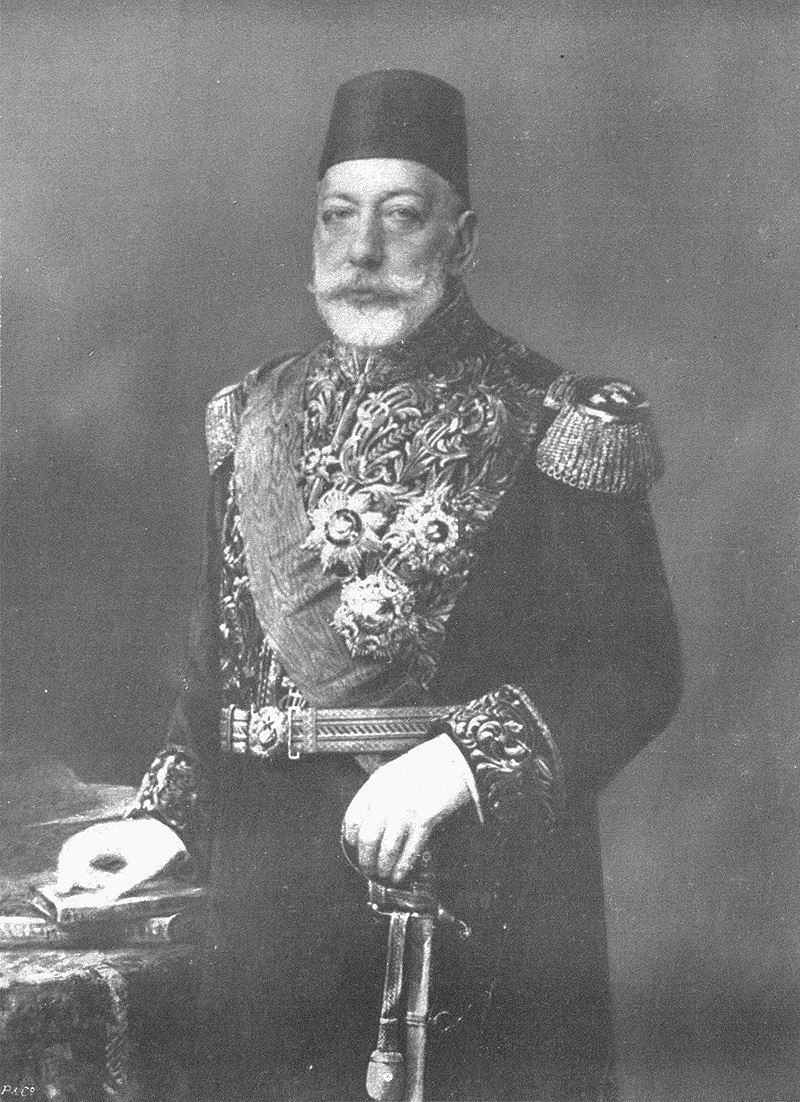
Sultan Mehmed V

Captain Walther Forstmann, most decorated World War I U-boat commander.

- Sultan Mehmed V of the Ottoman Empire declared jihad on the Allies.
- First Battle of Ypres — The Germans launched a major offensive from Messines, Belgium and broke through the Allied line to advance on Zwarteleen, some 3,000 yards (2,700 m) east of Ypres, where they were checked by a British cavalry brigade. At the same time, the Germans captured a strategic rise classified as Hill 60, which became a major battle location the following year.
- Battle of Łódź — Russian forces were surprised and routed by a sneak German attack on the left bank of the Vistula River in Poland, resulting in 12,000 Russian troops being captured. The attack created a 50 km (31 mi) gap between the Russian First and Second Armies.
- Bergmann Offensive — Ottoman forces counter-attacked and hit the Russian flanks, forcing the invading army to retreat in the Caucasus region.
- Battle of Basra — Troops with the Ottoman Empire tried to ambush British troops marching on Basra (in what is now southern Iraq) while they camped en route. However, the camp's defenses were able to repel the attack.
- German submarine commander Walther Forstmann of the SM U-12 sank his first Allied ship, British minesweeper HMS Niger, off the coast of England. Most of the ship's crew survived the sinking. Frostmann would eventually be credited for sinking close to 150 ships throughout World War I.
- The Ambala and 5th Cavalry Brigades of the British Indian Army were established.
- Sports club Rakkestad was formed in Rakkestad, Norway. The club has sections in association football, team handball, floorball, volleyball, track and field, gymnastics, skiing and speed skating.
- Sports club Espinho was established in Espinho, Portugal with programs in association football, volleyball, handball, track and field and swimming.
- An Australian propaganda film The Day, directed by Alfred Rolfe, was released to popular acclaim. The film depicted reenactments of reported German atrocities during the Rape of Belgium in August. The film is now considered lost.
- Born:
  - Howard Fast, American novelist and television writer, known for novels such as Spartacus and mysteries under the pen name E.V. Cunningham; in New York City, United States (d. 2003)
  - Daisy Bates, American activist, civil rights leader during the Little Rock Nine crisis in Little Rock, Arkansas; as Daisy Lee Gatson, in Huttig, Arkansas, United States (d. 1999)
  - Taslim Olawale Elias, Nigerian judge, Chief Justice of Nigeria from 1972 to 1975 and President of the International Court of Justice from 1982 to 1985; in Lagos, Colonial Nigeria (present-day Nigeria) (d. 1991)
  - Henry Wade, American lawyer, Dallas County District Attorney from 1951 to 1987, involved in the prosecution of Jack Ruby for killing Lee Harvey Oswald, and the landmark Roe v. Wade U.S. Supreme Court case on abortion; in Rockwall County, Texas, United States (d. 2001)
- Died:
  - A. E. J. Collins, 29, British cricketer and soldier, held the highest-ever recorded score in cricket of 628 in 1899 at the age of 13; killed in action at the First Battle of Ypres (b. 1885)
  - Benajah Harvey Carroll, 70, American theologian, author of Inspiration of Scripture which influenced the 1960s Southern Baptist Convention conservative resurgence (b. 1843)

== November 12, 1914 (Thursday) ==
- First Battle of Ypres — German forces bombarded British defenses and broke through the line, but did not have enough support to advance. German casualties for the battle had now reached about 80,000 men and casualties for the British Expeditionary Force since arriving in France in August nearly reached 90,000 men. The Belgian army had been reduced by half and the French had lost 385,000 men.
- Bergmann Offensive - Russian reinforcements under command of the General Mikhail Przevalski arrived to halt the retreat of General Georgy Bergmann's forces in northeastern Turkey.
- Maritz rebellion — Regular troops with the Union of South Africa under command of General Louis Botha defeated rebel Boer soldiers under command of Christiaan de Wet, with 120 casualties and 250 captured.
- The British ocean liner RMS Empress of Russia arrived at the Cocos Islands to pick up all non-wounded German sailors from the wrecked SMS Emden and transport them to Colombo.
- A mob of 1,500 people lynched John Evans in St. Petersburg, Florida, for the alleged murder of a local real estate developer and an assault on his wife, who claimed they were attacked by "two Negros". Evans innocence or guilt in the crime was never proven.
- Born:
  - Edward Schillebeeckx, Belgian theologian, author of the drafts for the Second Vatican Council; in Antwerp, Belgium (d. 2009)
  - Sylvi Saimo, Finnish rower, gold medalist at the 1952 Summer Olympics; as Syvli Sikiö, in Jaakkima, Finland (present-day Lakhdenpokhsky District, Russia) (d. 2004)
- Died: Augusto dos Anjos, 30, Brazilian poet, leading promoter of Modernism in Brazil; died from pneumonia (b. 1884)

== November 13, 1914 (Friday) ==
- First Battle of Ypres — Germany launched a surprise attack on French forces while British forces arrived to support the line. Meanwhile, the weather became much colder, with rain turning to snow within 48 hours. With night frost becoming common within the week and snow covering the ground, troops on opposing sides were succumbing to frostbite and fatigue. Snipers would shoot troops nodding off in trenches half-full of freezing water while artillery bombed opposing trenches. In 12 days, the battle would end simply because troops on both sides were too exhausted to fight.
- Battle of El Herri — A French colonial garrison of 1,200 men under command of Lieutenant-Colonel René Laverdure attacked Berber tribesmen part of the Zaian Confederation at a small settlement near the city of Khenifra in central Morocco, in direct violation of orders by General Hubert Lyautey not to engage in any military action while negotiating peace terms with the Confederation to end the Zaian War. The attack proved disastrous, after the Berber tribesmen regrouped, attacked and surrounded the French garrison after it attempted to return to Khenifra. The garrison was annihilated, with 623 troops and officers killed (including Laverdure) and another 176 wounded. The Berbers lost only 182 men.
- The traditional American Southern folk song "Carry Me Back to Old Virginny" was recorded by American opera singer Alma Gluck but written by African-American musician and songwriter James A. Bland in 1878. The song - released by the Victor Talking Machine Company - proved to be a hit and became the first recording by a celebrity classical singer to sell over a million copies.
- Born:
  - Henri Langlois, Turkish-French film preservationist, pioneer of film preservation, co-founder of the International Federation of Film Archives; in İzmir, Ottoman Empire (present-day Turkey) (d. 1977)
  - Günther Specht, German air force officer, lead Operation Bodenplatte for the Luftwaffe during the last months of World War II, recipient of the Knight's Cross of the Iron Cross, in Frankenstein, German Empire (present-day Ząbkowice Śląskie, Poland) (killed in action, 1945)
  - Amelia Bence, Argentine actress, leading film actress during the Golden Age of Argentine Cinema of 1940 to 1960; as María Amelia Batvinik, in Buenos Aires, Argentina (d. 2016)
  - William Gibson, American playwright, recipient of the Tony Award for Best Play for The Miracle Worker (d. 2008)

== November 14, 1914 (Saturday) ==
- Religious leader Shaykh al-Islām declared a holy war on behalf of the Ottoman Empire against the Allies.
- The Georgia Supreme Court upheld the decision by state judge Ben Hill not to grant Leo Frank a new trial. Frank had been found guilty in 1913 of the murder of 13-year old Mary Phagan in Atlanta but maintained his innocence.
- The British light cruiser HMS Carysfort was launched at Tyneside, England, and would serve World War I and the subsequent Russian Civil War in the 1920s.
- The British Army established the 67th Infantry Division.
- The first game was played in the new Alumni Stadium at the Worcester Polytechnic Institute in Worcester, Massachusetts, with the WPI Engineers defeating their rivals RPI Engineers 14–0.
- The Joensuu Town Hall, designed by Eliel Saarinen, was inaugurated in Joensuu, Finland.
- Kaiser Wilhelm II met with his cabinet and concluded that the Great War could not be won. Nonetheless, they continued the war for four more years.
- Died: Frederick Roberts, 82, British military officer, last Commander-in-Chief of the Forces for Great Britain; died from pneumonia (b. 1832)

== November 15, 1914 (Sunday) ==
- First Battle of Ypres — The Allies reinforced and reorganized their lines in west Belgium as the first snowfall of winter began.
- Bergmann Offensive — Taking advantage of Russian forces concentrating on slowing their retreat in Turkey, Ottoman forces crossed the border and defeated a Russian column near Borchka, a city in the lower Choruh valley of the Caucasus. The defeat forced the Russians to evacuate the cities of Borchka, Artvin and Ardanuch.
- HMAS Sydney arrived in Colombo with its convoy of prisoners from the SMS Emden. The ship's captain Karl von Müller and his commanding officers were imprisoned in England while the sailors were taken to prisoner-of-war camps in Australia where both remained until the end of World War I.
- The first major fatality in professional football occurred when Harry Turner, center for the Canton Professionals in the Ohio League, died after his back was broken following a tackle against opponent Joe Collins during a game against the Akron Indians. His manager Jack Cusack was at his bedside and reported Turner's last words were: "I know I must go but I'm satisfied, for we beat [Akron Indians coach] Peggy Parratt." Canton won the game 6–0.
- Benito Mussolini founded the newspaper Il Popolo d'Italia ("The People of Italy") which advocated militarism and irredentism. The paper was subsidized by the French and industrialists on the pretext of influencing Italy to join the Allies and became the foundation for the Fascist movement in the country after World War I.
- The Colonial Exhibition of Semarang in the Dutch East Indies officially closed.
- The Nagai railroad was extended in Yamagata Prefecture, Japan, with stations Imaizumi, Nagai, Nishi-Ōtsuka, Shin-Ōkubo, and Tokiniwa serving the line.
- The first trolleybuses began operating in Shanghai.
- Association football club Hespanha was formed by Spanish immigrants in Santos, São Paulo, Brazil, and was renamed to its present title Jabaquara in 1942.
- Born:
  - Petar Drapšin, Serbian commando, commander of the armies of the Yugoslav Partisans resistance movement against the Nazis during World War II; in Turija, Srbobran, Austria-Hungary (present-day Serbia) (d. 1945)
  - Erich Steidtmann, German SS officer during World War II, involved in trying to suppress the Warsaw Ghetto Uprising during The Holocaust; in Weißenfels, German Empire (present-day Germany) (d. 2010)
  - Santo Trafficante Jr., American gangster, noted for his connections to Cuba president Fulgencio Batista and his association in the plot to assassinate Fidel Castro; in Tampa, Florida, United States (d. 1987)

== November 16, 1914 (Monday) ==
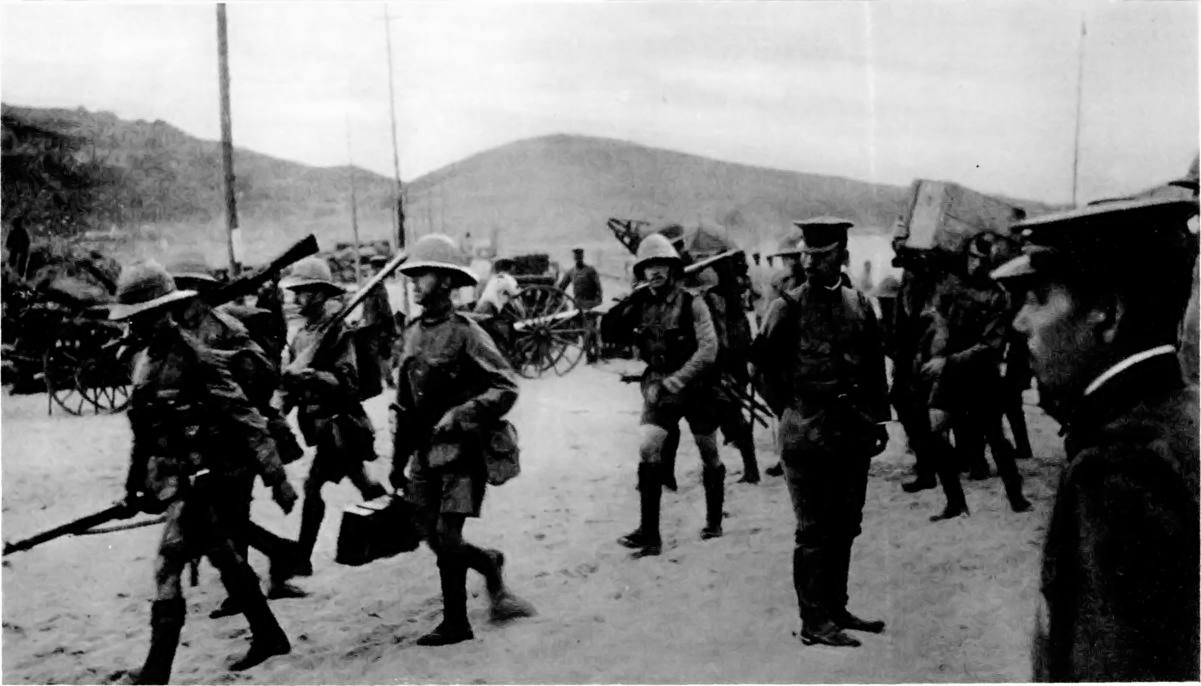
British troops arriving at Tsingtao.

- Battle of Kolubara — Austro-Hungarian forces under command of Oskar Potiorek made a third attempt to invade Serbia by way of the Kolubara River. The battle between invading forces and the defending Serbian army commenced over the next five days in heavy rain and snowfall, with many soldiers on both sides succumbing to hypothermia and frostbite as they did to bullets.
- Siege of Tsingtao — Japanese and British forces formally took over the German colonial port of Tsingtao. Japanese casualties numbered 236 killed and 1,282 wounded; the British had 12 killed and 53 wounded, and the Germans had 199 dead and 504 wounded.
- First Battle of Ypres — Ferdinand Foch was promoted to command the French Ninth Army manning the French line in west Belgium and northeastern France, which now ran some 430 miles (690 km) along the Western Front.
- Battle of Łódź — The Russian Fifth Army was ordered to Łódź to reinforce existing forces around the city from a suspected German offensive following a surprise assault five days earlier. In actuality, German commander Paul von Hindenburg intended the attack as a ruse to focus most of Russia's strength in one area and create a weakened flank German forces could exploit.
- Russian forces under command of General Mikhail Przevalski crossed the Aras River in northeastern Turkey and launched a dawn attack on Ottoman forces to halt their advance.
- Battle of Basra — British forces defeated Ottoman troops defending Saihan, Iraq, south of Basra, with the Ottomans suffering 250 casualties.
- Zaian War — French forces fought through territory held by the Zayanes to relieve badly depleted defences in Khenifra, Morocco, following the disastrous defeat at El Herri three days earlier.
- The Federal Reserve opens for business.
- American banker Benjamin Strong Jr. became Governor of the Federal Reserve Bank of New York, the first Federal Reserve Bank of the United States to officially open under the Federal Reserve Act.
- The University of Santo Domingo was established in Santo Domingo, Dominican Republic.
- The Baltimore Museum of Art was founded at Johns Hopkins University.
- British writer M. P. Shiel was convicted and imprisoned for "indecently assaulting and carnally knowing" his 12-year-old stepdaughter on October 26 in London.
- Born: Eddie Chapman, English spy, worked as double agent for Nazi Germany during World War II; as Edward Arnold Chapman, in Burnopfield, London (d. 1997)
- Died: Shunrō Oshikawa, 38, Japanese journalist and writer, considered the pioneer of genre fiction in Japan including detective and science fiction (b. 1876)

== November 17, 1914 (Tuesday) ==
- First Battle of Ypres — General Albrecht, Duke of Württemberg, commander of the German 4th Army, ordered all attacks to cease to allow reserve units to move to the Eastern Front, which would take the Allies three days to discover.
- Bergmann Offensive — The Russian offensive petered out, with losses to the Imperial Russian Army numbering more than 7,000 killed and injured.
- Battle of Krzywopłoty — Forces aligned with the Polish Legions clashed with Russian forces at the village of Krzywopłoty in Galicia (now Poland). The Polish Legion was able to halt a local Russian offensive after two days of fighting. The Legion sustained over 170 casualties. The battle was commemorated at the Tomb of the Unknown Soldier in Warsaw.
- The British government announced that income tax was to be doubled in order to finance the war-time budget.
- The German armored cruiser Friedrich Carl struck two mines laid down by the Imperial Russian Navy in the Baltic Sea. However, she was able to stay afloat for a few hours, allowing the crew to complete a seaplane attack on the Russian port of Libau. The ship's 585-man crew then evacuated before it capsized.
- Royal Navy battleship Royal Oak was launched from the Devonport Royal Dockyard in Devonport, Plymouth, England, and would participate in the Battle of Jutland in 1916.
- The inaugural meeting of the Union of Democratic Control was held in London to set up an advocacy group focused on the British government forming a more responsive foreign policy following the end of World War I. While meant to be non-partisan, it was dominated by members of the Labour Party and Liberal Party.
- The Norwegian shipping company Odfjell was established in Bergen, Norway.
- The Zenboku railroad, the precursor to the Jeolla Line, opened in North Jeolla Province, Korea, with station Jeonju serving the line.
- Born: Moshe Teitelbaum, Hassidic rabbi, world leader of the Satmar Hasidim from 1980 to 2006; in Újfehértó, Austria-Hungary (present-day Hungary) (d. 2006)

== November 18, 1914 (Wednesday) ==
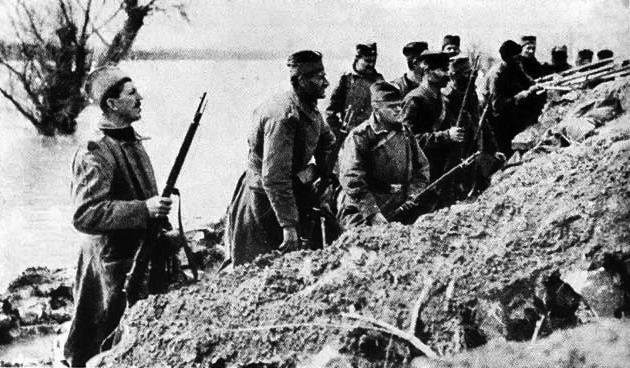
Serbian soldiers defending Belgrade during the Battle of Kolubara.

- Battle of Kolubara — Austro-Hungarian forces began an assault on the Serbian town of Lazarevac, which would provide a strategic launching spot for a siege on Belgrade to the north.
- Battle of Łódź — Russian and German forces clashed near Łódź, Poland in bitter winter conditions, even though both armies were still outfitted in summer clothing. A damaged bridge forced German forces to locate an alternative crossing over the Vistula River, and mixed orders caused some units to halt while other advanced too far, spreading out forces thinly. With a large contingent of German troops in danger of being surrounded, Russia ordered trains to the front to anticipate capturing up to 20,000 prisoners (in actuality, there was only a German force of 11,000).
- Mexican Revolution — Mexican revolutionary leaders Pancho Villa and Emiliano Zapata advanced on Mexico City after Venustiano Carranza publicly refused to step down from his presidential seat.
- Battle of Cape Sarych — German battleship SMS Goeben, now the Yavuz for the Ottoman Navy, along with its sister ship SMS Breslau, now the Midilli, engaged with ships with the Russian Black Sea Fleet off the Crimean coast. The Yavuz exchanged fire with the Russian battleship Evstafi, with the Black Sea Fleet warship scoring a hit that killed 13 crew and wounded three more. However, Yavuz scored more devastating hits on Evstafi, killing 34 Russian crew and wounding another 24, forcing the ship and the rest of the fleet to retreat.
- German General Friedrich Freiherr Kress von Kressenstein was appointed Chief of Staff to the Ottoman Fourth Army upon arrival to Constantinople and would lead the Raid on the Suez Canal in 1915.
- Admiral Alfred von Tirpitz, Secretary of State for the Imperial German Navy, advocated massed Zeppelin attacks on London in a letter: "The English are now in terror of the Zeppelin, perhaps not without reason ... one could set fire to London in thirty places, then what in a small way is odious would retire before something fine and powerful."
- Karolina Kózka, a 16-year-old girl who was fully committed to her Catholic faith, died while resisting an attempted rape by a Russian soldier near her village of Wał-Ruda, Poland. Kózka was stabbed several times by a bayonet and died from her wounds after escaping. Because of her strong religious faith and her violent death, her burial site became a religious shrine for many Polish Catholics who saw her as a martyr. In 1987, after much campaigning from Poland, Pope John Paul II beatified her as a "martyr of Christ."
- Died: Shibli Nomani, 57, Indian theologian, promoter of Islam in India (b. 1857)

== November 19, 1914 (Thursday) ==
- Battle of Kolubara — Austro-Hungarian forces gained a foothold in Serbia as the opposing armies fell back towards Belgrade.
- Battle of Basra — The British captured a mud fortress built by the Ottomans at Sahil, Iraq. Ottoman troops retreated, losing 1,000 men while the British lost 350.
- The Box Office Attractions Company, later known as Fox Film, released its first film feature Life's Shop Window, adapted from the novel by Annie Sophie Cory. It was directed by J. Gordon Edwards and starred Claire Whitney and Stuart Holmes. The original film was lost in a fire in 1937.
- Born: Mills Godwin, American politician, 60th and 62nd Governor of Virginia; in Chuckatuck, Virginia, United States (d. 1999)

== November 20, 1914 (Friday) ==
- The German Naval Corps was established to command the land-based forces of the Imperial German Navy operating in Flanders, which stretched from Belgium to northeastern France.
- The largest white-tailed deer ever killed by a hunter in the United States was measured at 206 1/8 net typical points under the Boone and Crockett Club scoring system. James Jordan, a 22-year old hunter of Burnett County, Wisconsin, shot the buck using a .25-20 Winchester. It held the record of being the largest deer killed until 1993 when a larger buck was shot by Milo Hansen in Saskatchewan.
- Died:
  - Vinnie Ream, 67, American sculptor, famous for the statue of Abraham Lincoln at the United States Capitol rotunda (b. 1847)
  - Dimitrije Tucović, 33, Serbian philosopher and activist, founder of the Serbian Social Democratic Party; killed in action at the Battle of Kolubara (b. 1881)

== November 21, 1914 (Saturday) ==
- Canadian Prime Minister Robert Borden announced Canada was increasing its Canadian Expeditionary Force by 50,000, which would total 91,000 Canadian soldiers serving in World War I by 1915.
- Battle of Kolubara — Austro-Hungarian and Serbian forces clashed at Mount Maljen in Serbia, with the Serbians giving up the mountain after three days of intense fighting.
- Battle of Basra — The British learned the Ottoman forces had abandoned the city of Basra in Iraq and were able to take the city unopposed.
- Three Royal Naval Air Service Avro 504s based at Belfort, France, conducted the first long-range strategic bombing raid, attacking German airship sheds on the shore of Lake Constance at Friedrichshafen, Germany.
- The 3rd Cavalry Brigade of the British Indian Army was established.
- German navy light cruiser Elbing was launched from the Schichau-Werke shipyard in Danzig. It would be part of the German fleet at the Battle of Jutland in 1916.
- Harvard defeated Yale 36–0 in the first football game held at the new Yale Bowl in New Haven, Connecticut, before an estimated crowd of 70,000 to 74,000 spectators.
- Born:
  - Henri Laborit, French physician and researcher, leading researcher in neurology and evolutionary psychology; in Hanoi, French Indochina (present-day Vietnam) (d. 1995)
  - Abd al-Karim Qasim, Iraqi state leader, 24th Prime Minister of Iraq; in Baghdad, Ottoman Empire (present-day Iraq) (executed, 1963)

== November 22, 1914 (Sunday) ==
- First Battle of Ypres — The battle wound down as neither side planned new attacks to allow soldiers to rest and prepare for winter. The Allies suffered major casualties, with the French sustaining somewhere 50,000 to 80,000 casualties, followed by the British with over 58,000, and Belgium with over 21,000. The Germans sustained a minimum 46,000 casualties and may have gone as high as over 100,000.
- Ottoman Navy minelayer Nilufer, formally the British passenger vessel SS Frederica, struck a mine in the Black Sea and sank with all crew evacuated.
- The União Agrícola Barbarense association football club was formed in Santa Bárbara d'Oeste, São Paulo, Brazil. Initially an amateur club, it began to compete in the professional league Campeonato Paulista starting in 1964.
- Born: Peter Townsend, British air force officer, commander of the No. 605 and No. 85 Squadrons during World War II, recipient of the Distinguished Service Order, Distinguished Flying Cross, and Royal Victorian Order, known for his romantic relationship with Princess Margaret; in Rangoon, Burma, British India (present-day Yangon, Myanmar) (d. 1995)
- Died: Henry Küss, 62, French mining engineer, noted for developing several mines in South America, Africa and Australia (b. 1852)

== November 23, 1914 (Monday) ==
- Defence of Festubert — A German infantry regiment captured 800 yards (730 m) of trench east of Festubert, France from British Indian Corps. However, Sikh and Indian troops counter-attacked at night and recovered the trenches.
- The U.S. Marines withdrew from Veracruz, Mexico after occupying the town since April, allowing soldiers under the command of Venustiano Carranza to move in to set up the leader's main headquarters.
- British guard boat Dorothy Gray spotted a submarine periscope belonging to German submarine SM U-18 off the coast of Scotland and managed to ram it twice. Severely damaged, the sub was forced to surface and most of the crew were captured before the vessel sank.
- Born:
  - Emmett Ashford, American baseball umpire, first African-American umpire in Major League Baseball; in Los Angeles, United States (d. 1980)
  - Donald Nixon, American business executive, brother to U.S. President Richard Nixon; as Francis Donald Nixon, in Yorba Linda, California, United States (d. 1987)
  - Charles H. MacDonald, American air force officer, commander of the 475th Fighter Group during World War II, six-time recipient of the Distinguished Flying Cross and two-time recipient of the Distinguished Service Cross and Silver Star, as well as the Legion of Merit and Air Medal; in DuBois, Pennsylvania, United States (d. 2002)

== November 24, 1914 (Tuesday) ==
- Expecting Serbian resistance to crumble within days, Austro-Hungarian Army commanding officer Oskar Potiorek appointed General Stjepan Sarkotić to become Governor of Bosnia and Herzegovina while he assumed command of occupying forces in Serbia.
- Benito Mussolini was expelled from the Italian Socialist Party.
- The British Army established the 69th Infantry Division.
- Born:
  - Lynn Chadwick, English sculptor, known for metal sculpture work collections at the Museum of Modern Art in New York City, the Tate Gallery in London and Centre Pompidou in Paris, recipient of the Order of the British Empire; in Barnes, London, England (d. 2003)
  - Agostino Casaroli, Italian clergy, Cardinal Secretary of State for the Vatican from 1979 to 1990, in Castel San Giovanni, Kingdom of Italy (present-day Italy) (d. 1998)
  - Bessie Blount Griffin, writer, known for helping injured soldiers during World War II, and invented an assistive device that permitted people who had lost a limb to feed themselves; in Hickory, Virginia, United States (d. 2009)
- Died: Sidney Randolph DeLong, 85, American politician, first mayor of Tucson, Arizona (b. 1828)

== November 25, 1914 (Wednesday) ==
- A German patrol boat spotted and rammed British submarine HMS D2 off the coast of Germany, killing all 25 crew.
- Born: Joe DiMaggio, American baseball player, center fielder for the New York Yankees from 1936 to 1942 and 1946 to 1951, best known for his unbroken 56-game hitting streak in 1941, second husband to Marilyn Monroe; as Giuseppe Paolo DiMaggio, in Martinez, California, United States (d. 1999)

== November 26, 1914 (Thursday) ==
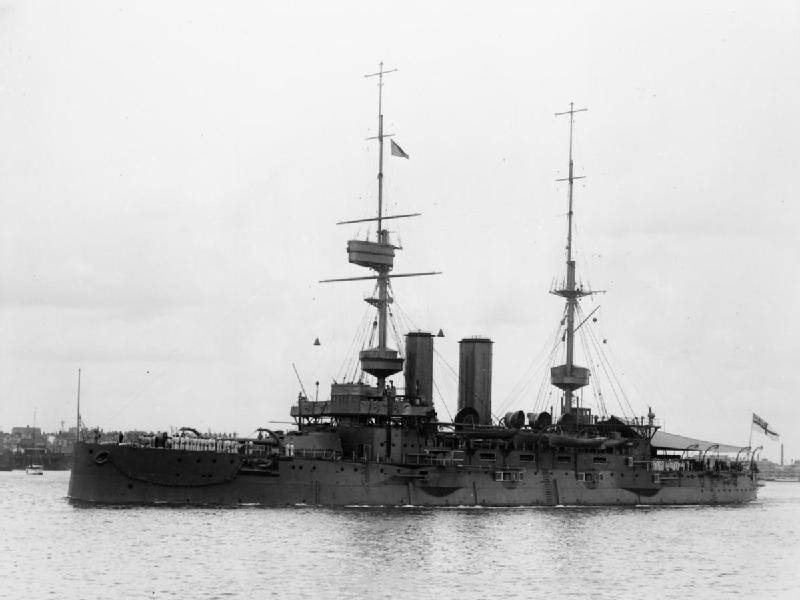
HMS Bulwark.

- British battleship HMS Bulwark was blown apart by an internal explosion at her moorings on the Medway off Kingsnorth, Kent, England, killing 738 of her 750 crew.
- Battle of Łódź — A surrounded German force of 11,000 broke out of its pocket by exploiting confused Russian movements, allowing them to capture 12,000 prisoners and 64 guns.
- Battle of Kolubara — Austro-Hungarian forces attempted to cross a critical juncture in Serbia where the river Kolubara met with the Sava River, but were beaten back by stiff Serbian resistance and forced out of the area the following day.
- Incumbent Alexander Peacock retained his seat as Premier of Victoria after the Commonwealth Liberal Party won 49 of the 65 seats in Victorian Legislative Assembly during state elections in Australia.
- Austrian biologist Karl von Frisch published his first significant paper on honey bee behavior, including "dancing" as a form of communication.
- The Prussian Officer and Other Stories by D. H. Lawrence was published by Duckworth in London. The collection included the short story "Odour of Chrysanthemums" which was first published in the July 1911 issue of The English Review.

== November 27, 1914 (Friday) ==
- A magnitude 6.3 earthquake struck Lefkada, Greece, killing 14 people and damaging or destroying many homes on the island.
- Battle of Kolubara — Despite sustaining severe casualties, the Austro-Hungarian Army resumed attacks on the Serbian army and stretched defenses thin south of Belgrade.
- A schooner carrying 50 German navy men from the landing party of the destroyed SMS Emden were allowed entry in the port of Padang of the Dutch East Indies, but under strict terms so the Netherlands could maintain their stance of neutrality during World War I.
- Died: James Reavis, 71, American fraudster, famously tried to defraud the U.S. Government out of large land claims measuring thousands of square miles in the Arizona Territory and New Mexico Territory (b. 1843)

== November 28, 1914 (Saturday) ==
- A methane gas explosion hit in New Yūbari coal mine in Hokkaido, Japan. According to Japanese government official confirmed report, 423 people were human fatalities. The fourth worst coal mine disaster in nation's history.
- The New York Stock Exchange re-opened for bond trading after closing in August due to the onset of World War I.
- The German landing party that commandeered a schooner after SMS Emden was disabled at the Battle of Cocos left Padang port in the Dutch East Indies rather than risk having the schooner confiscated by authorities. The commanding officer left a message with German merchant fleet in the area to meet them at a rendezvous point away from Dutch territorial waters.
- The annual United States Army-Navy football game was played at Franklin Field in Philadelphia, with Army beating Navy 20–0.
- Australian tennis player Arthur O'Hara Wood won the 10th edition of the Australian Open, defeating Gerald Patterson 6–4, 6–3, 5–7, 6–1 in the men's singles.
- Born:
  - Vincent Fago, American comic book artist, best known for his work on Timely Comics which included Mighty Mouse and Terrytoons Comics; as Vincenzo Francisco Gennaro Di Fago, in New York City, United States (d. 2002)
  - Cecil Brower, American violinist, best known for his TV performances on Ozark Jubilee, Five Star Jubilee and The Jimmy Dean Show; in Bellevue, Texas, United States (d. 1965)

== November 29, 1914 (Sunday) ==
- Battle of Łódź — Fearing a repeat of the disaster at Tannenberg in August, Russia ordered its armies to withdraw to defensive positions around Warsaw, leaving Łódź unprotected.
- Battle of Kolubara — Despite the Serbian army inflicting heavy casualties on the invading Austro-Hungarian Army, officials in Belgrade felt defenses would not hold against renewed attacks and ordered the city to be evacuated.
- The No. 1 Wing for the Royal Flying Corps was established.
- U.S. President Woodrow Wilson named a strike board for Colorado to prevent future violent labor unrest like the Colorado Coalfield War.
- Kerry defeated Wexford to win the All-Ireland Senior Football Championship title at Croke Park, Dublin.
- Bishop James O'Reilly dedicated the opening of St. James Basilica in Jamestown, North Dakota.
- Born: Clinton D. "Casey" Vincent, American air force officer, commander of the Fourteenth Air Force during World War II, three-time recipient of the Distinguished Flying Cross, four-time recipient of the Air Medal, Distinguished Service Medal, Silver Star and Legion of Merit; in Gail, Texas, United States (d. 1955)

== November 30, 1914 (Monday) ==
- Joseph Joffre, Commander-in-Chief of French troops since the start of World War One, issued an order directing his army commanders to advance the trenches to within 150 metres (490 ft) of the German positions in order to bring the attacking infantry closer to its objectives.
- The first successful surgery for duodenal atresia was performed, as surgeon N. P. Ernst of Copenhagen's St Elisabeth's Hospital saved the life of an 11-day old boy.
- A trawler of Britain's Royal Navy successfully recovered a lead-lined safe that had been on the ocean floor since the sinking, at the Battle of Texel in October of the German torpedo boat S-119. From the safe, British intelligence found the code book revealing the Verkehrsbuch code that the Germans used to communicate with its embassies and warships.
- Britain's King George V made his first visit to the Western Front in wartime, traveling to France on a visit that started at Dieppe and lasted for five days until his return on December 5.
- Jack Dempsey, who would reign as the heavyweight boxing champion of the world from 1919 to 1926, made his pro boxing debut, knocking out Billy Murphy in the first round in a bout at the Garrick Theater in Salt Lake City, Utah.
- The Swedish American Line passenger shipping company was founded as Rederiaktiebolaget Sverige-Nordamerika (Sweden-North America Shipping) as a safer transport option because of Sweden's neutrality during World War One, and would operate from 1915 to 1986.
- Born:
  - Charles Hawtrey, British actor, best known for supporting roles in the Carry On film series; as George Frederick Joffre Hartree, in Hounslow, England (d. 1988)
  - Harry Jeffra, American boxer, World Bantamweight champion in 1937 and World Featherweight champion in 1940; as Ignacius Pasquale Guiffi, in Baltimore, United States (d. 1988)
  - Sir Syed Sani Syed Ali Shah Bukhari, Indian religious leader, founder of the Mazhar Ul Haq School, in Beerwah, Jammu and Kashmir, India (d. 1979)
