= Yamato Station =

Yamato Station may refer to:

- Yamato Station (Fukushima) (山都駅) in Fukushima, Japan connected with JR East Ban-etsu Nishi Line
- Yamato Station (Ibaraki) (大和駅) in Ibaraki, Japan connected with JR East Mito Line
- Yamato Station (Kanagawa) (大和駅) in Kanagawa, Japan connected with Odakyu Enoshima Line and Sagami Railway Main Line
