= Hideya =

- Gender: Male

Origin
- Origin: Japanese
- Meaning: Different meanings depending on the kanji used

Hideya (written: 秀弥, 秀哉 or 英也) is a masculine Japanese given name. Notable people with the name include:

- Hideya Kawahara, computer programmer and developer of Project Looking Glass
- Hideya Matsumoto, Japanese mathematician
- Hideya Okamoto (岡本 英也; born 1987), Japanese footballer
- Hideya Suzuki, Japanese musician and member of Mr. Children
- Hideya Tawada (多和田 秀弥; born 1993), Japanese actor and model

== See also ==
- Hideya Station, a railway station in Aga, Higashikanbara District, Niigata Prefecture, Japan
