= Nishiaizu, Fukushima =

Nishiaizu 西会津町
- Town
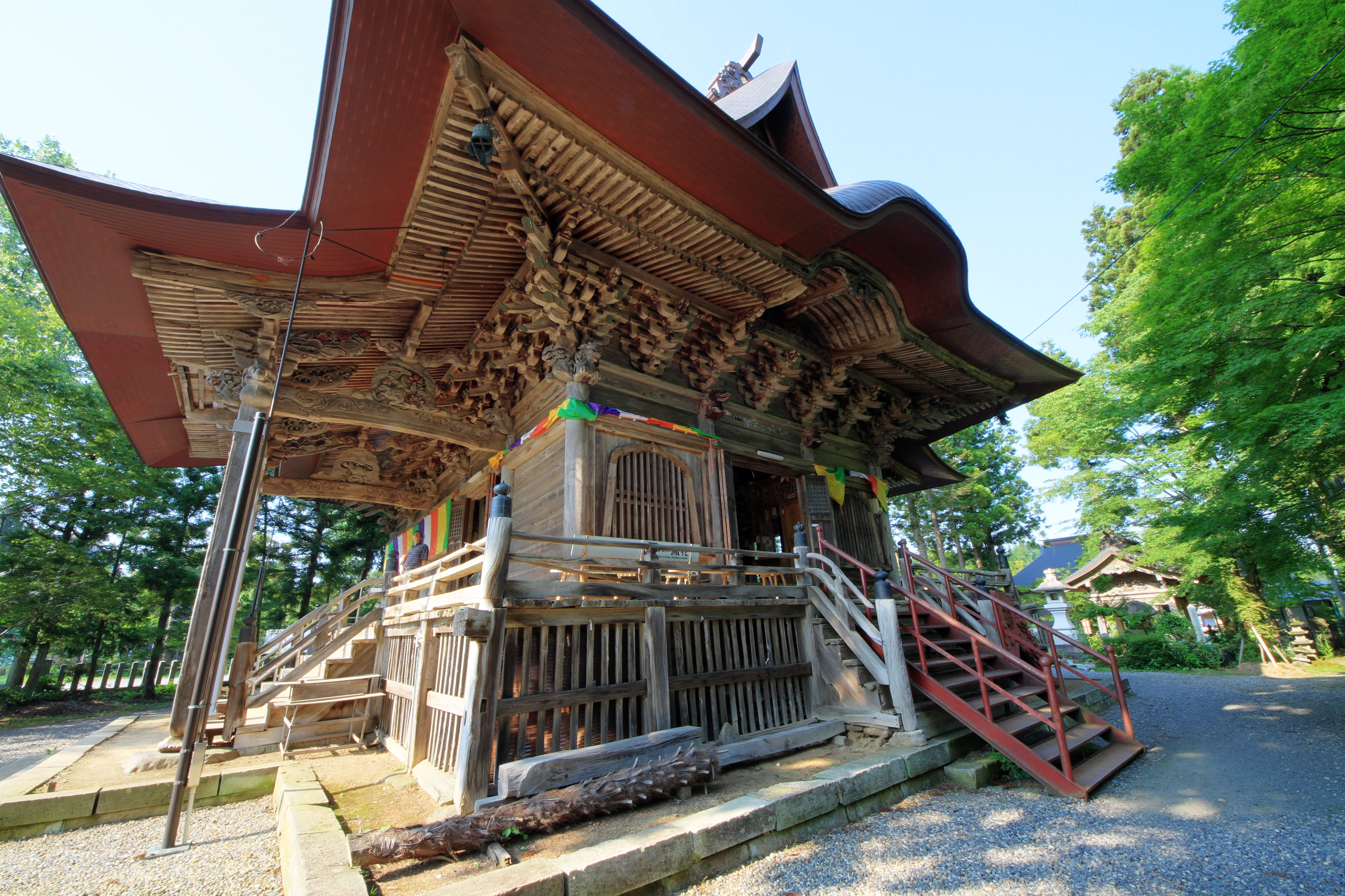
- Nyoho-ji Temple

- Flag Seal

- Location of Nishiaizu in Fukushima Prefecture

- Coordinates: 37°35′19.8″N 139°38′50.9″E
- Country: Japan
- Region: Tōhoku
- Prefecture: Fukushima
- District: Yama

Area
  - Total: 298.18 km^{2} (115.13 sq mi)

Population (April 2020)
  - Total: 6,090
  - Density: 20.4/km^{2} (52.9/sq mi)
- Time zone: UTC+9 (Japan Standard Time)
- Phone number: 0241-45-2211
- Address: 3261 Otsu Nozawa Shimokoyaue Nishiaizu-machi, Yama-gun, Fukushima-ken 969-4495
- Climate: Cfa
- Website: Official website
- Symbols
- Flower: Lilium
- Tree: Paulownia tomentosa

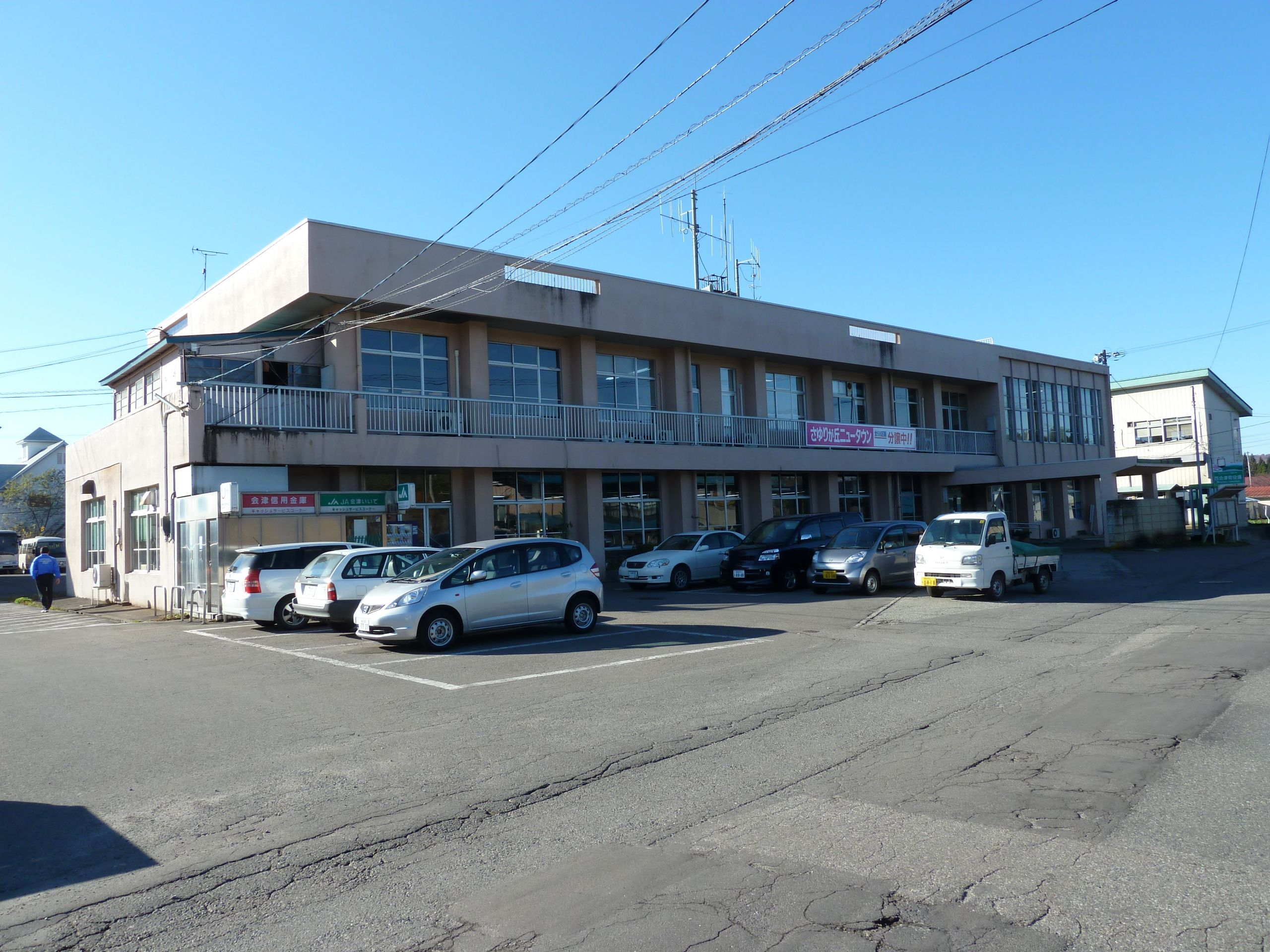
Nishiaizu Town Hall

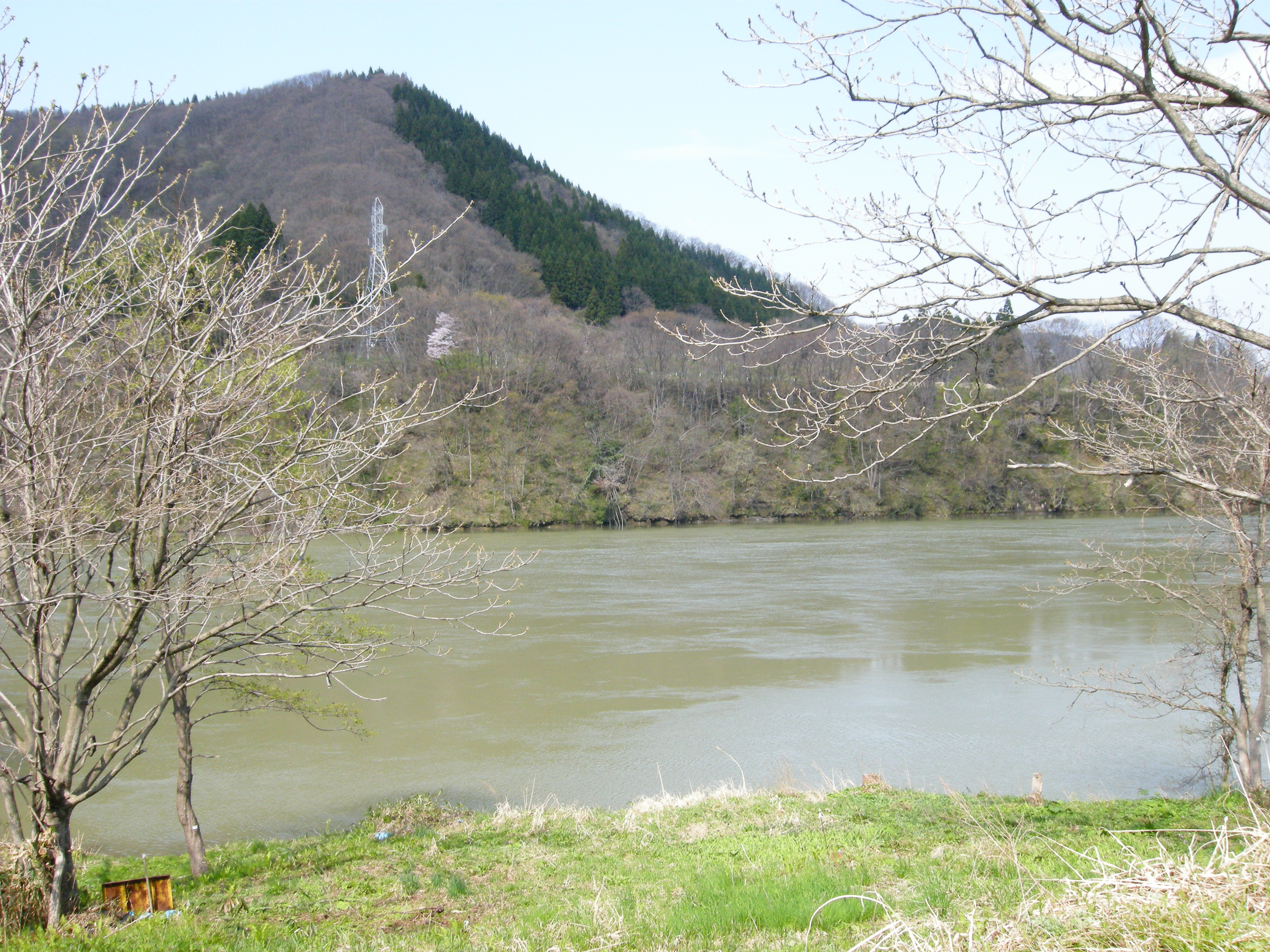
Aga River in Nishiaizu

Nishiaizu (西会津町, Nishiaizu-machi) is a town located in Fukushima Prefecture, Japan. As of 1 April 2020, the town had an estimated population of 6,090 in 2598 households, and a population density of 20 persons per km^{2}. Approximately 66% of the population is over the age of 65. The total area is 298.18 square kilometres (115.13 sq mi).

== Geography ==
Nishiaizu is located at the far northwestern corner of the Aizu region of Fukushima Prefecture, bordered Niigata Prefecture to the north and the west. It is known as the "front door" to the Iide Mountains. About 86 percent of the total area is composed of mountains and forests.

- Mountains: Mount Mikunidake (1644 m)
- Rivers: Aga River

=== Neighboring municipalities ===
Fukushima Prefecture

- Aizubange
- Kaneyama
- Kitakata
- Yanaizu

Niigata Prefecture

- Aga

=== Climate ===
Nishiaizu has a humid continental climate (Köppen Dfb) characterized by warm summers and cold winters with heavy snowfall. The average annual temperature in Nishiaizu is 11.8 °C. The average annual rainfall is 1548 mm with September as the wettest month. The temperatures are highest on average in August, at around 25.4 °C, and lowest in January, at around -0.9 °C.

Climate data for Nishiaizu (1991−2020 normals, extremes 1976−present)
Month	Jan	Feb	Mar	Apr	May	Jun	Jul	Aug	Sep	Oct	Nov	Dec	Year
Record high °C (°F)	13.2 (55.8)	15.2 (59.4)	22.1 (71.8)	29.1 (84.4)	33.6 (92.5)	34.3 (93.7)	36.8 (98.2)	36.9 (98.4)	35.9 (96.6)	30.1 (86.2)	23.9 (75.0)	19.7 (67.5)	36.9 (98.4)
Mean daily maximum °C (°F)	2.8 (37.0)	3.8 (38.8)	8.0 (46.4)	15.8 (60.4)	21.9 (71.4)	25.0 (77.0)	28.1 (82.6)	29.7 (85.5)	25.3 (77.5)	19.0 (66.2)	12.1 (53.8)	5.5 (41.9)	16.4 (61.5)
Daily mean °C (°F)	−0.4 (31.3)	−0.2 (31.6)	2.7 (36.9)	9.0 (48.2)	15.1 (59.2)	19.5 (67.1)	23.2 (73.8)	24.2 (75.6)	19.9 (67.8)	13.4 (56.1)	7.0 (44.6)	2.0 (35.6)	11.3 (52.3)
Mean daily minimum °C (°F)	−3.6 (25.5)	−4.1 (24.6)	−1.9 (28.6)	2.9 (37.2)	8.9 (48.0)	14.7 (58.5)	19.3 (66.7)	20.0 (68.0)	15.8 (60.4)	9.1 (48.4)	3.0 (37.4)	−1.0 (30.2)	6.9 (44.5)
Record low °C (°F)	−16.7 (1.9)	−17.0 (1.4)	−14.8 (5.4)	−6.8 (19.8)	−0.9 (30.4)	4.8 (40.6)	10.1 (50.2)	10.6 (51.1)	5.5 (41.9)	−0.4 (31.3)	−6.1 (21.0)	−12.5 (9.5)	−17.0 (1.4)
Average precipitation mm (inches)	193.1 (7.60)	127.0 (5.00)	121.1 (4.77)	91.9 (3.62)	83.6 (3.29)	122.5 (4.82)	233.5 (9.19)	169.0 (6.65)	132.1 (5.20)	134.5 (5.30)	160.3 (6.31)	217.4 (8.56)	1,786 (70.31)
Average snowfall cm (inches)	237 (93)	187 (74)	107 (42)	13 (5.1)	0 (0)	0 (0)	0 (0)	0 (0)	0 (0)	1 (0.4)	3 (1.2)	118 (46)	663 (261)
Average precipitation days (≥ 1.0 mm)	22.0	18.4	18.4	13.5	10.9	11.7	14.9	11.6	12.3	13.6	17.0	21.4	185.7
Average snowy days (≥ 3 cm)	21.4	19.1	14.3	1.8	0	0	0	0	0	0.1	0.3	10.3	67.3
Mean monthly sunshine hours	59.8	71.6	119.1	168.5	190.3	158.7	149.2	190.4	136.7	118.1	89.5	61.5	1,520.2
Source: Japan Meteorological Agency

== Demographics ==
Per Japanese census data, the population of Nishiaizu has declined by more than two-thirds over the past 60 years.

Historical population
Year	Pop.	±%
1960	18,336	—
1970	14,200	−22.6%
1980	11,490	−19.1%
1990	10,122	−11.9%
2000	9,075	−10.3%
2010	7,362	−18.9%
2020	5,770	−21.6%

== History ==
The area of present-day Nishiaizu was part of ancient Mutsu Province and formed part of the holdings of Aizu Domain during the Edo period. After the Meiji Restoration, it was organized as part of Yama District, Fukushima Prefecture. The town of Nishiaizu was founded on July 1, 1954, through a merger of the villages of Shingo and Okugawa with the town of Nozawa and villages of Onomoto, Tosejima, Mutsuai, Shitatani, Muraoka, Kaminojiri and Hosaka in Kawanuma District. In 2006, Nishiaizu residents decided to decline a merger with the city of Kitakata.

== Economy ==
Nishiaizu is a rural area with a local economy dependent on agriculture and forestry.

== Education ==
Nishiaizu has one public elementary school and one public junior high school operated by the town government, and one public high school operated by the Fukushima Prefectural Board of Education.

- Nishiaizu Elementary School
- Nishiaizu High School.

== Transportation ==
=== Railway ===
JR East – Ban'etsu West Line

- Onobori - Nozawa - Kami-Nojiri - Tokusawa

=== Highway ===
- Ban-etsu Expressway – Nishiaizu PA
- National Route 49
- National Route 400
- National Route 459

== Local attractions ==
- Enmanji Kannon-dō, the temple building is the one designated Important Cultural Property in Nishiaizu.
- Torioi-Kannon Nyohōji - the gate and four wooden statues are Fukushima Prefectural Important Cultural Properties. The temple houses one of the Aizu region's three important statues of Kannon.
