= Yamato Station (Fukushima) =

Railway station in Kitakata, Fukushima Prefecture, Japan

Yamato Station 山都駅
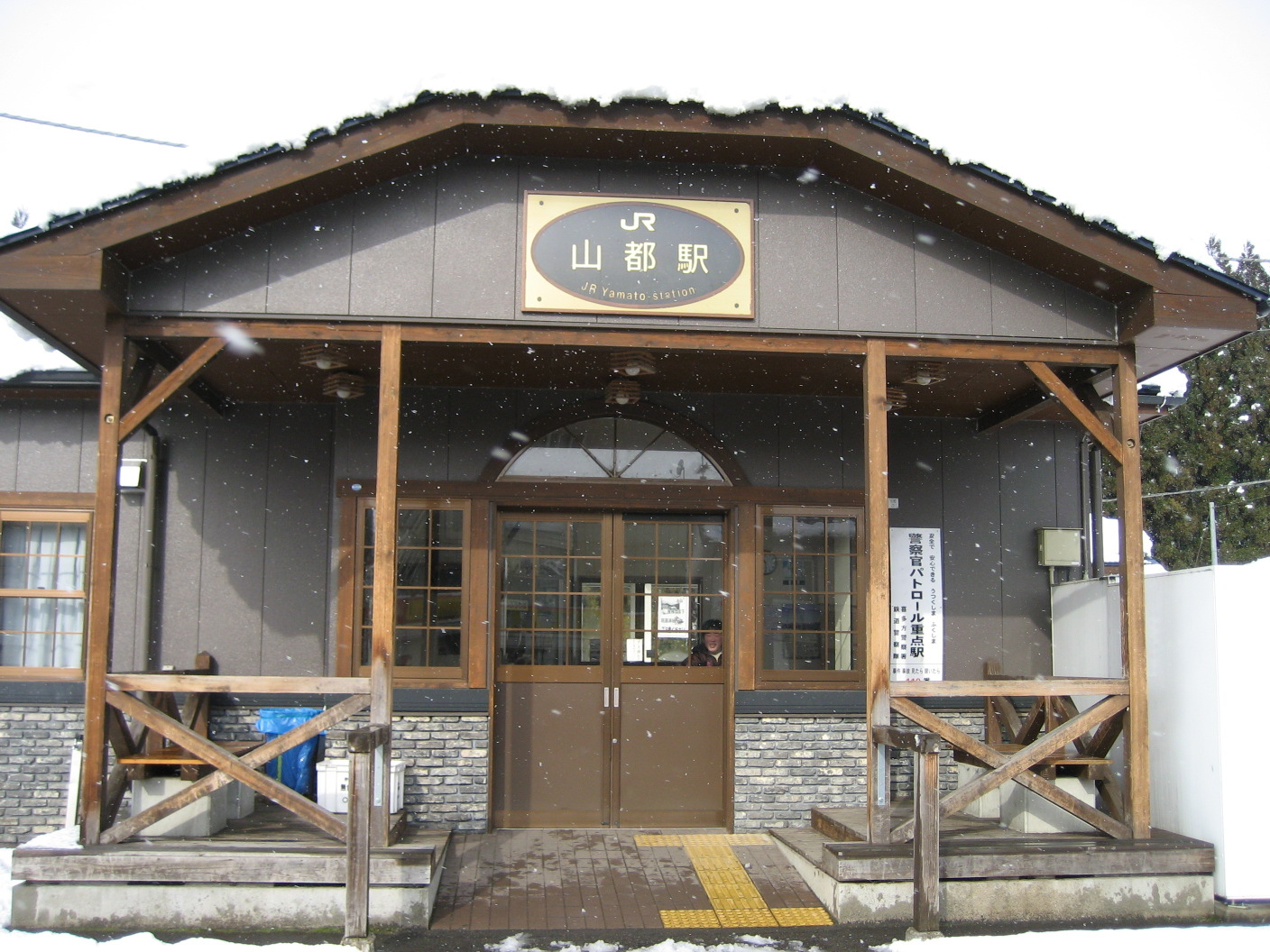
- Yamato Station, January 2007

General information
- Location: 2884 Nishihara Yamatomachi, Kitakata-shi, Fukushima-ken 966-0000; Japan
- Coordinates: 37.6392°N 139.7664°E
- Operator: JR East
- Line: ■ Ban'etsu West Line
- Distance: 91.1 km from Kōriyama
- Platforms: 1 side + 1 island platform
- Tracks: 3

Other information
- Status: Staffed
- Website: Official website

History
- Opened: December 15, 1910

Passengers
- FY 2017: 211 daily

Services
Preceding station	JR East	Following station
Ogino towards Niitsu	Ban'etsu West Line Rapid Agano	Kitakata towards Aizu-Wakamatsu
Ogino towards Niitsu	Ban'etsu West Line Local	Kitakata towards Kōriyama
Location
- Location within Fukushima Prefecture Location within Japan

Yamato Station (山都駅, Yamato-eki) is a railway station on the Ban'etsu West Line in the city of Kitakata, Fukushima Prefecture, Japan, operated by East Japan Railway Company (JR East).

== Lines ==
Yamato Station is served by the Ban'etsu West Line, and is located 91.1 rail kilometers from the official starting point of the line at Kōriyama.

== Station layout ==
Yamato Station has a single side platform and a single island platform connected to the station building by a footbridge. The station is staffed.

=== Platforms ===
1	■ Ban'etsu West Line	for Nozawa, Gosen and Niitsu
2	■ Ban'etsu West Line	for Kōriyama, Aizu-Wakamatsu
3	■ Ban'etsu West Line	(Siding)

== History ==
Yamato Station opened on December 15, 1910. The station was absorbed into the JR East network upon the privatization of the Japanese National Railways (JNR) on April 1, 1987.

In fiscal 2017, the station was used by an average of 211 passengers daily (boarding passengers only).

== Surrounding area ==
- former Yamato Town Hall
- Aga River

== See also ==
- List of railway stations in Japan
