= Kanose Station =

Railway station in Aga, Niigata Prefecture, Japan

Kanose Station 鹿瀬駅
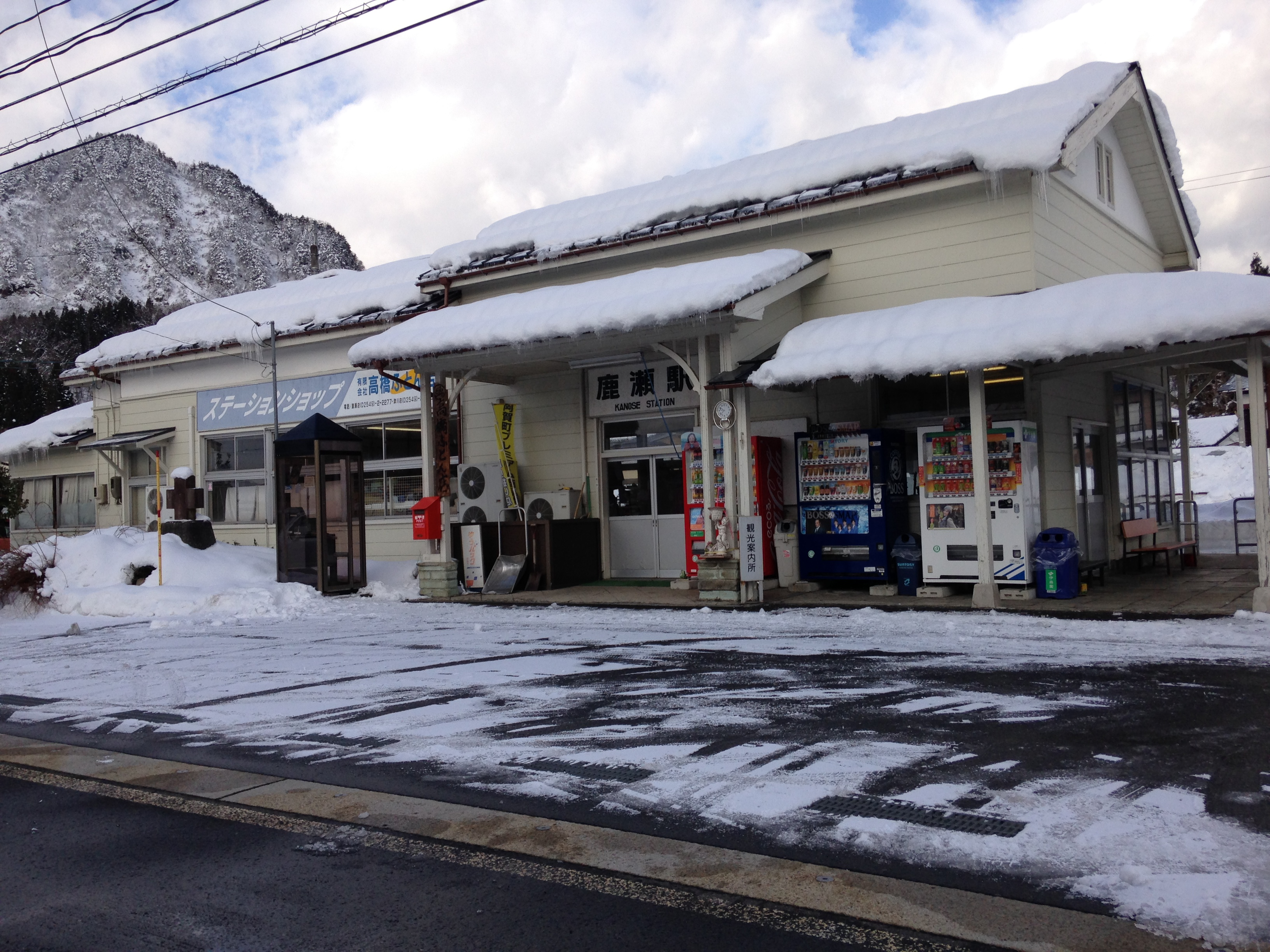
- Kanose Station, January 2014

General information
- Location: 858 Mukai-Kanose, Aga-machi, Higashikambara-gun, Niigata-ken 959-4301; Japan
- Coordinates: 37.6956°N 139.4796°E
- Operator: JR East
- Line: ■ Ban'etsu West Line
- Distance: 133.6 km from Kōriyama
- Platforms: 1 side platform
- Tracks: 1

Other information
- Status: Unstaffed
- Website: Official website

History
- Opened: 1 November 1914

Services
Preceding station	JR East	Following station
Tsugawa towards Niitsu	Ban'etsu West Line Rapid Agano	Nozawa towards Aizu-Wakamatsu
Tsugawa towards Niitsu	Ban'etsu West Line Local	Hideya towards Kōriyama
Location
- Location within Japan

Kanose Station (鹿瀬駅, Kanose-eki) is a railway station in the town of Aga, Higashikanbara District, Niigata Prefecture, Japan, operated by East Japan Railway Company (JR East).

== Lines ==
Kanose Station is served by the Ban'etsu West Line, and is 133.6 kilometers from the terminus of the line at Kōriyama.

== Station layout ==
The station consists of one side platform serving a single bi-directional track. The station is unattended.

== History ==
The station opened on 1 November 1914. With the privatization of Japanese National Railways (JNR) on 1 April 1987, the station came under the control of JR East.

== Surrounding area ==
- former Kanose town hall
- National Route 459
- Kanose Post Office

== See also ==
- List of railway stations in Japan
