= Toyomi Station =

Railway station in Aga, Niigata Prefecture, Japan

Toyomi Station 豊実駅
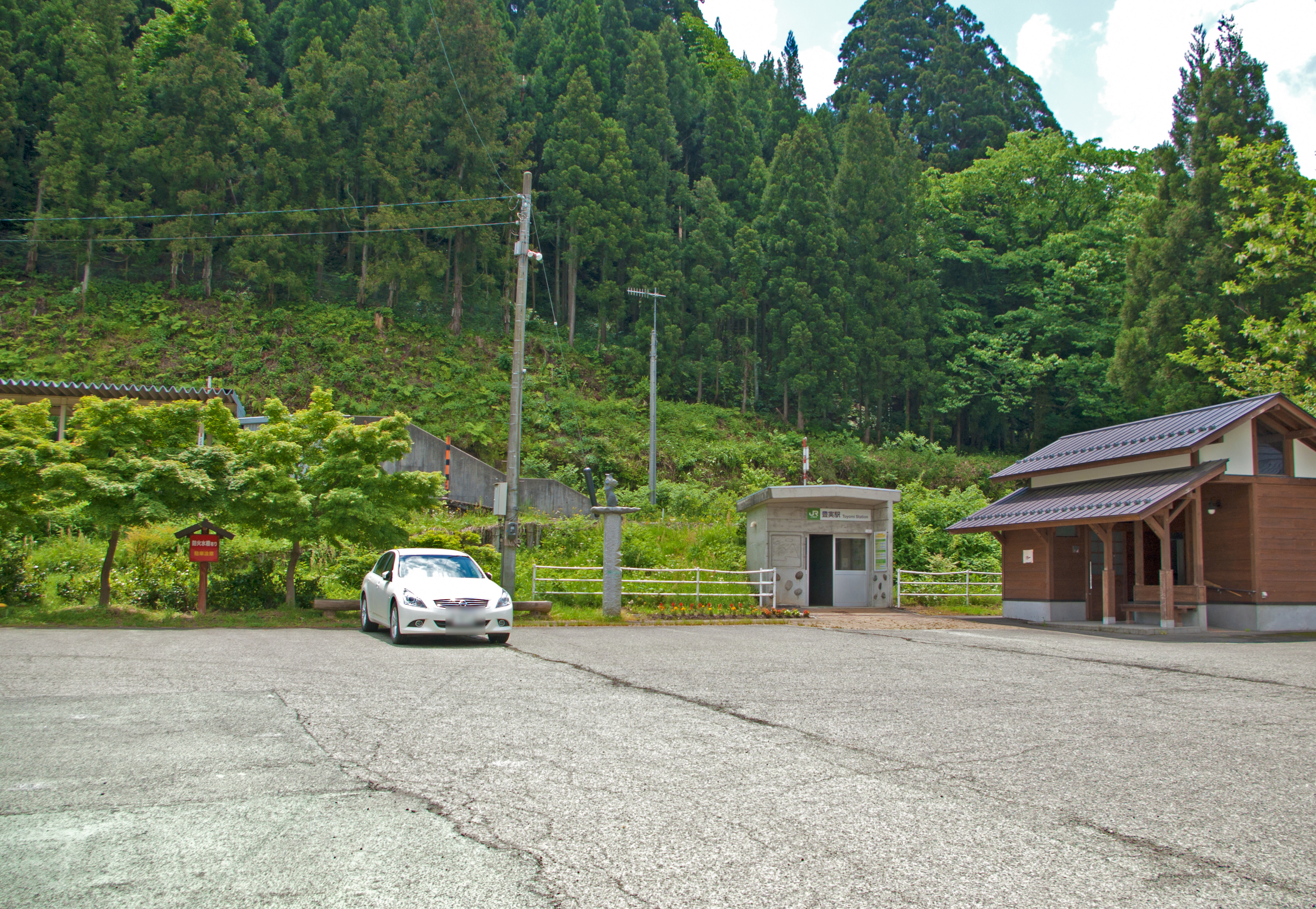
- Toyomi Station, July 2014

General information
- Location: Toyomi, Aga-machi, Higashikambara-gun, Niigata-ken 959-4304; Japan
- Coordinates: 37.6806°N 139.5763°E
- Operator: JR East
- Line: ■ Ban'etsu West Line
- Distance: 121.3 km from Kōriyama
- Platforms: 1 side platform
- Tracks: 1

Other information
- Status: Unstaffed
- Website: Official website

History
- Opened: 1 November 1914

Services
| Preceding station | JR East | Following station |
|---|---|---|
| Hideya towards Niitsu | Ban'etsu West Line Local | Tokusawa towards Kōriyama |
Location
- Location within Japan

Toyomi Station (豊実駅, Toyomi-eki) is a railway station in the town of Aga, Higashikanbara District, Niigata Prefecture, Japan, operated by East Japan Railway Company (JR East).

== Lines ==
Toyomi Station is served by the Ban'etsu West Line, and is 121.3 kilometers from the terminus of the line at Kōriyama.

== Station layout ==
The station consists of one side platform serving a single bi-directional track on an embankment, connected to the station building by a tunnel. The station is unattended.

== History ==
The station opened on 1 November 1914. With the privatization of Japanese National Railways (JNR) on 1 April 1987, the station came under the control of JR East.

== Surrounding area ==
- Agano River
- National Route 459
- Toyomi Post Office

== See also ==
- List of railway stations in Japan
