= Onobori Station =

Railway station in Nishiaizu, Fukushima Prefecture, Japan

Onobori Station 尾登駅
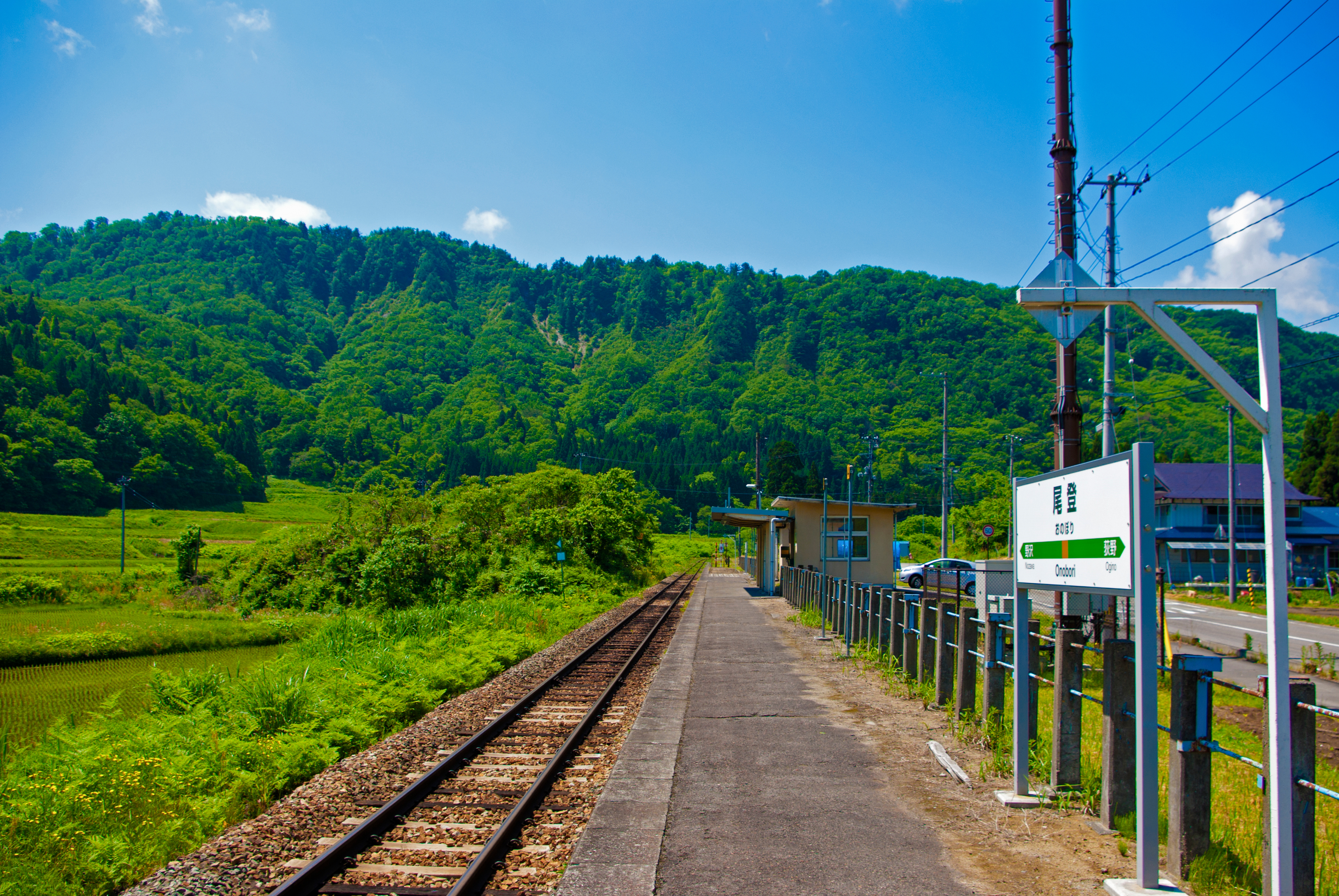
- Onobori Station, June 2010

General information
- Location: Tosejima, Nishiaizu-machi, Yama-gun, Fukushima-ken 969-4401; Japan
- Coordinates: 37.6088°N 139.6918°E
- Operator: JR East
- Line: ■ Ban'etsu West Line
- Distance: 101.0 km from Kōriyama
- Platforms: 1 side platform
- Tracks: 1

Other information
- Status: Unstaffed
- Website: Official website

History
- Opened: November 1, 1955

Services
Preceding station	JR East	Following station
Nozawa towards Niitsu	Ban'etsu West Line Local	Ogino towards Kōriyama
Location
- Location within Fukushima Prefecture Location within Japan

Onobori Station (尾登駅, Onobori-eki) is a railway station on the Ban'etsu West Line in the town of Nishiaizu, Yama District, Fukushima Prefecture, Japan, operated by East Japan Railway Company (JR East).

== Lines ==
Onobori Station is served by the Ban'etsu West Line, and is located 101.0 rail kilometers from the official starting point of the line at Kōriyama.

== Station layout ==
Onobori Station has one side platform serving a single bi-directional track. The station is unattended.

== History ==
Onobori Station opened on November 1, 1955. The station was absorbed into the JR East network upon the privatization of the Japanese National Railways (JNR) on April 1, 1987.

== Surrounding area ==
The station is located in an isolated rural area surrounded by fields.

== See also ==
- List of railway stations in Japan
