= Tokusawa Station =

Railway station in Nishiaizu, Fukushima Prefecture, Japan

Tokusawa Station 徳沢駅
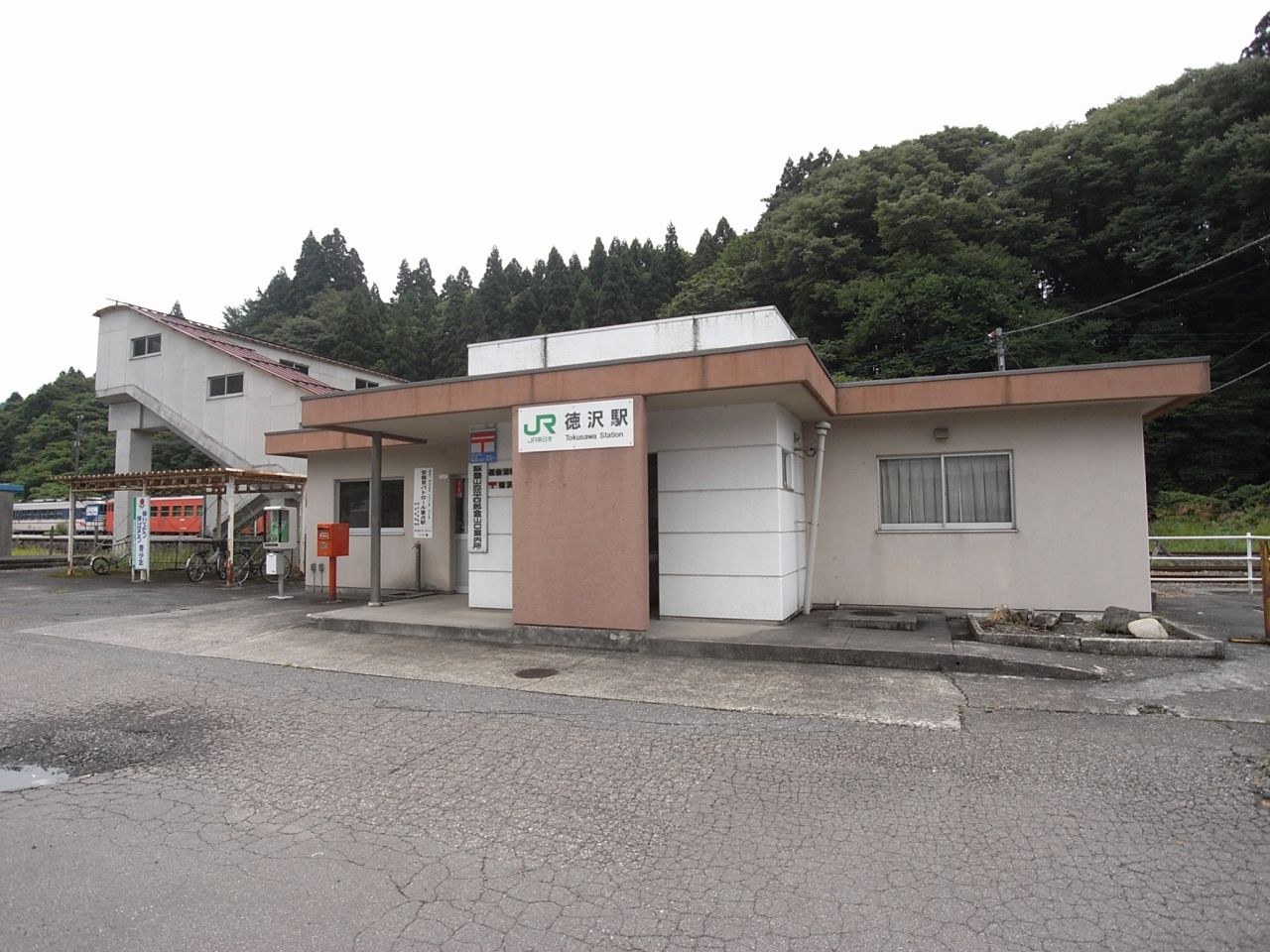
- Tokusawa Station, September 2008

General information
- Location: Muraoka Tokusawa 641, Nishiaizu-machi, Yama-gun, Fukushima-ken 969-4511; Japan
- Coordinates: 37.6667°N 139.6029°E
- Operator: JR East
- Line: ■ Ban'etsu West Line
- Distance: 108.0 km from Kōriyama
- Platforms: 1 island platforms
- Tracks: 2

Other information
- Status: Staffed
- Website: Official website

History
- Opened: November 1, 1914

Passengers
- FY 2012: 14 daily

Services
Preceding station	JR East	Following station
Toyomi towards Niitsu	Ban'etsu West Line Local	Kami-Nojiri towards Kōriyama
Location
- Location within Fukushima Prefecture Location within Japan

Tokusawa Station (徳沢駅, Tokusawa-eki) is a railway station on the Ban'etsu West Line in the town of Nishiaizu, Yama District, Fukushima Prefecture, Japan, operated by East Japan Railway Company (JR East).

== Lines ==
Tokusawa Station is served by the Ban'etsu West Line, and is located 108.0 rail kilometers from the official starting point of the line at Kōriyama.

== Station layout ==
Tokusawa Station has a single unnumbered island platform, connected to the station building by a footbridge. The stations is staffed.

=== Platforms ===
station side	■ Ban'etsu West Line	for Gosen and Niitsu
opposite side	■ Ban'etsu West Line	for Kitakata, Aizu-Wakamatsu

== History ==
Tokusawa Station opened on November 1, 1914. The station was absorbed into the JR East network upon the privatization of the Japanese National Railways (JNR) on April 1, 1987.

== Surrounding area ==
- Aga River
- National Route 459

== See also ==
- List of railway stations in Japan
