= Wakimoto =

Wakimoto (written: 脇本) is a Japanese surname. Notable people with the surname include:

- Kosei Wakimoto (born 1994), Japanese footballer
- Roger Wakimoto (born 1953), American atmospheric scientist
- Yuta Wakimoto (脇本 雄太, born 1989), Japanese cyclist
