= Hideya Station =

Railway station in Aga, Niigata Prefecture, Japan

Hideya Station 日出谷駅
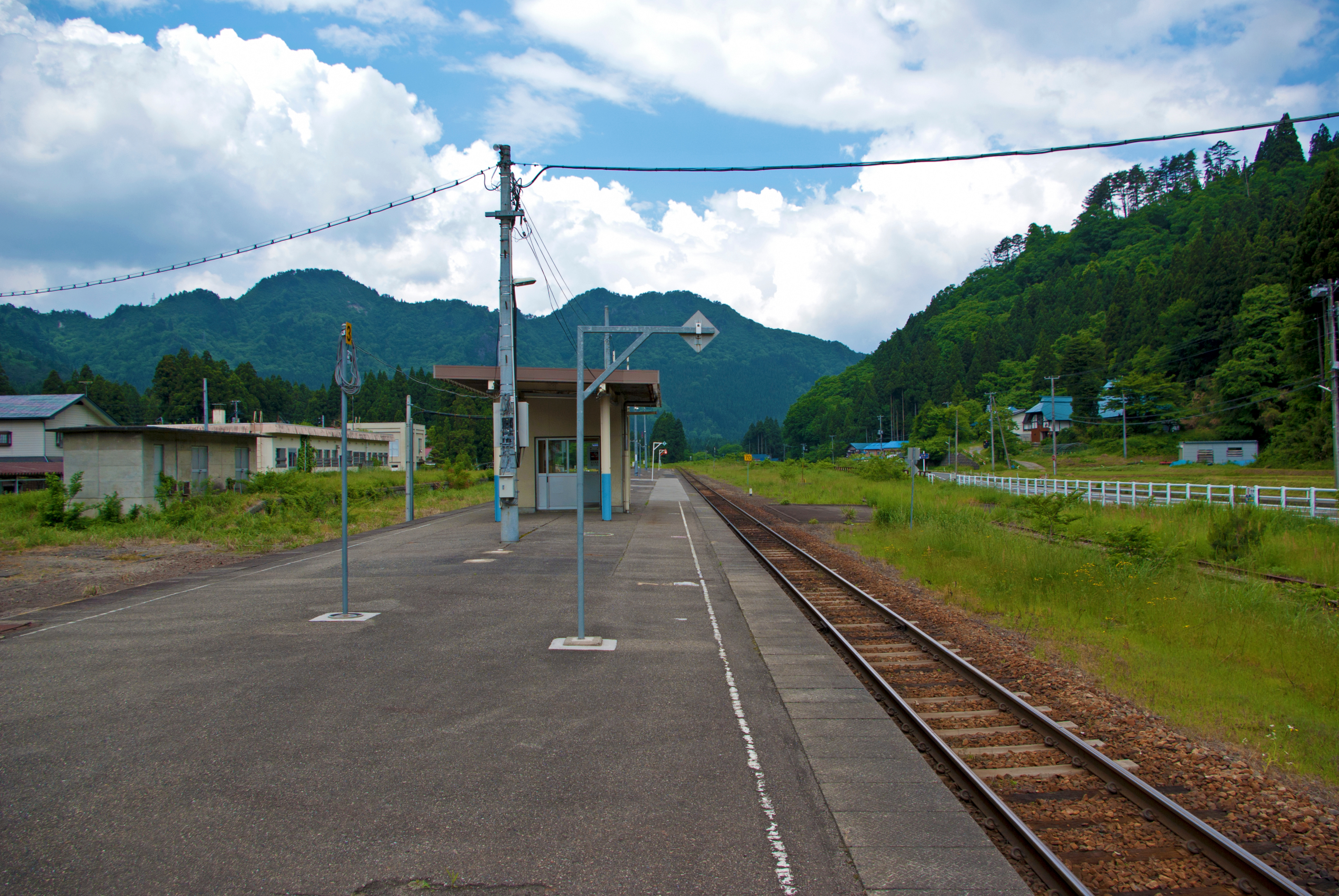
- Hideya Station platform, June 2010

General information
- Location: 3401 Hideya, Aga-machi, Higashikambara-gun, Niigata-ken 959-4303; Japan
- Coordinates: 37.7055°N 139.5338°E
- Operator: JR East
- Line: ■ Ban'etsu West Line
- Distance: 128.4 km from Kōriyama.
- Platforms: 1 side platform
- Tracks: 1

Other information
- Status: Unstaffed
- Website: www.jreast.co.jp/estation/station/info.aspx?StationCd=1325

History
- Opened: 1 November 1914

Services
Preceding station	JR East	Following station
Kanose towards Niitsu	Ban'etsu West Line Local	Toyomi towards Kōriyama
Location
- Location within Japan

Hideya Station (日出谷駅, Hideya-eki) is a railway station in the town of Aga, Higashikanbara District, Niigata Prefecture, Japan, operated by East Japan Railway Company (JR East).

== Lines ==
Hideya Station is served by the Ban'etsu West Line, and is 128.4 kilometers from the terminus of the line at Kōriyama.

== Station layout ==
The station consists of one side platform serving a single bi-directional track. The station is unattended.

== History ==
The station opened on 1 November 1914. With the privatization of Japanese National Railways (JNR) on 1 April 1987, the station came under the control of JR East.

== Surrounding area ==
- Aga Hideya Elementary School
- National Route 459
- Hideya Post Office

== See also ==
- List of railway stations in Japan
