= Ogino Station (Fukushima) =

Railway station in Kitakata, Fukushima Prefecture, Japan

Ogino Station 荻野駅
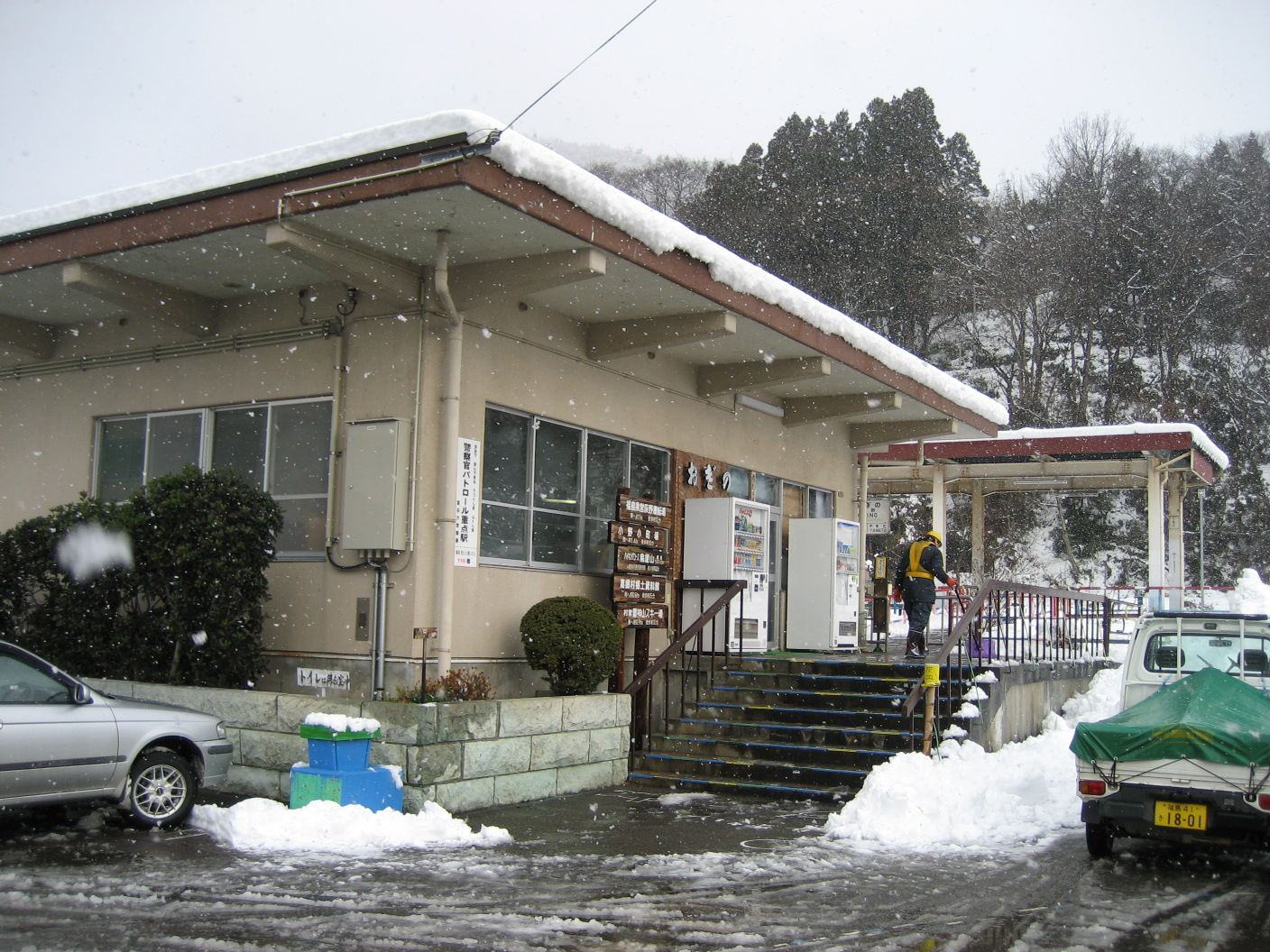
- Ogino Station, January 2007

General information
- Location: 125 Babagashira Kamigo Takasatomachi, Kitakata-shi, Fukushima-ken 969-4301; Japan
- Coordinates: 37.6176°N 139.7222°E
- Operator: JR East
- Line: ■ Ban'etsu West Line
- Distance: 97.2 km from Kōriyama
- Platforms: 1 side platform
- Tracks: 1

Other information
- Status: Staffed
- Website: Official website

History
- Opened: November 1, 1914

Passengers
- FY 2017: 20 daily

Services
| Preceding station | JR East | Following station |
|---|---|---|
| Nozawa towards Niitsu | Ban'etsu West Line Rapid Agano | Yamato towards Aizu-Wakamatsu |
| Onobori towards Niitsu | Ban'etsu West Line Local | Yamato towards Kōriyama |
Location
- Location within Fukushima Prefecture Location within Japan

Ogino Station (荻野駅, Ogino-eki) is a railway station on the Ban'etsu West Line in the city of Kitakata, Fukushima Prefecture, Japan, operated by East Japan Railway Company (JR East).

== Lines ==
Ogino Station is served by the Ban'etsu West Line, and is located 97.2 rail kilometers from the official starting point of the line at Kōriyama.

== Station layout ==
Ogino Station has one side platform serving a single bi-directional track. The station is staffed.

== History ==
Ogino Station opened on November 1, 1914. A new station building was completed in 1978. The station was absorbed into the JR East network upon the privatization of the Japanese National Railways (JNR) on April 1, 1987.

== Passenger statistics ==
In fiscal 2017, the station was used by an average of 20 passengers daily (boarding passengers only).

== Surrounding area ==
- Aizu-Takasato Post Office
- former Takasato village hall
- Aga River

== See also ==
- List of railway stations in Japan
