= Kami-Nojiri Station =

Railway station in Nishiaizu, Fukushima Prefecture, Japan

Kami-Nojiri Station 上野尻駅
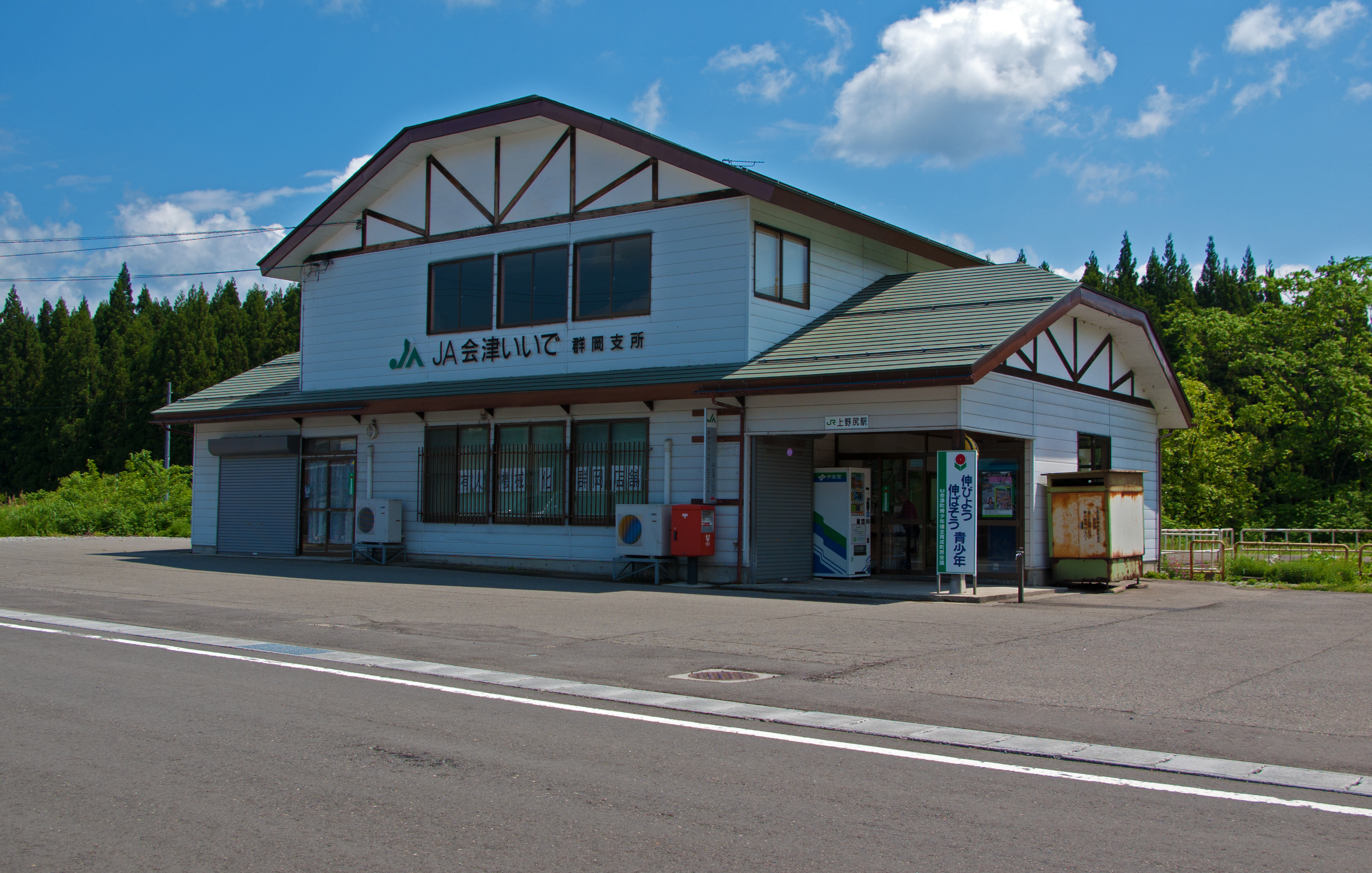
- Kami-Nojiri Station, June 2010

General information
- Location: Kaminojiri Ota 2805, Nishiaizu-machi, Yama-gun, Fukushima-ken 969-4512; Japan
- Coordinates: 37.6252°N 139.6340°E
- Operator: JR East
- Line: ■ Ban'etsu West Line
- Distance: 111.3 km from Kōriyama
- Platforms: 1 side platform
- Tracks: 1

Other information
- Status: Staffed
- Website: Official website

History
- Opened: November 1, 1914

Passengers
- FY 2017: 16 daily

Services
Preceding station	JR East	Following station
Tokusawa towards Niitsu	Ban'etsu West Line Local	Nozawa towards Kōriyama
Location
- Location within Fukushima Prefecture Location within Japan

Kami-Nojiri Station (上野尻駅, Kami-Nojiri-eki) is a railway station on the Ban'etsu West Line in the town of Nishiaizu, Yama District, Fukushima Prefecture, Japan, operated by East Japan Railway Company (JR East).

== Lines ==
Kami-Nojiri Station is served by the Ban'etsu West Line, and is located 111.3 rail kilometers from the official starting point of the line at Kōriyama.

== Station layout ==
Kami-Nojiri Station has one side platform serving a single bi-directional track. The station is staffed.

== History ==
Kami-Nojiri Station opened on November 1, 1914. The station was absorbed into the JR East network upon the privatization of the Japanese National Railways (JNR) on April 1, 1987.

== Passenger statistics ==
In fiscal 2017, the station was used by an average of 16 passengers daily (boarding passengers only).

== Surrounding area ==
- Aga River
- National Route 49

== See also ==
- List of railway stations in Japan
