= Nozawa Station =

Railway station in Nishiaizu, Fukushima Prefecture, Japan

Nozawa Station 野沢駅
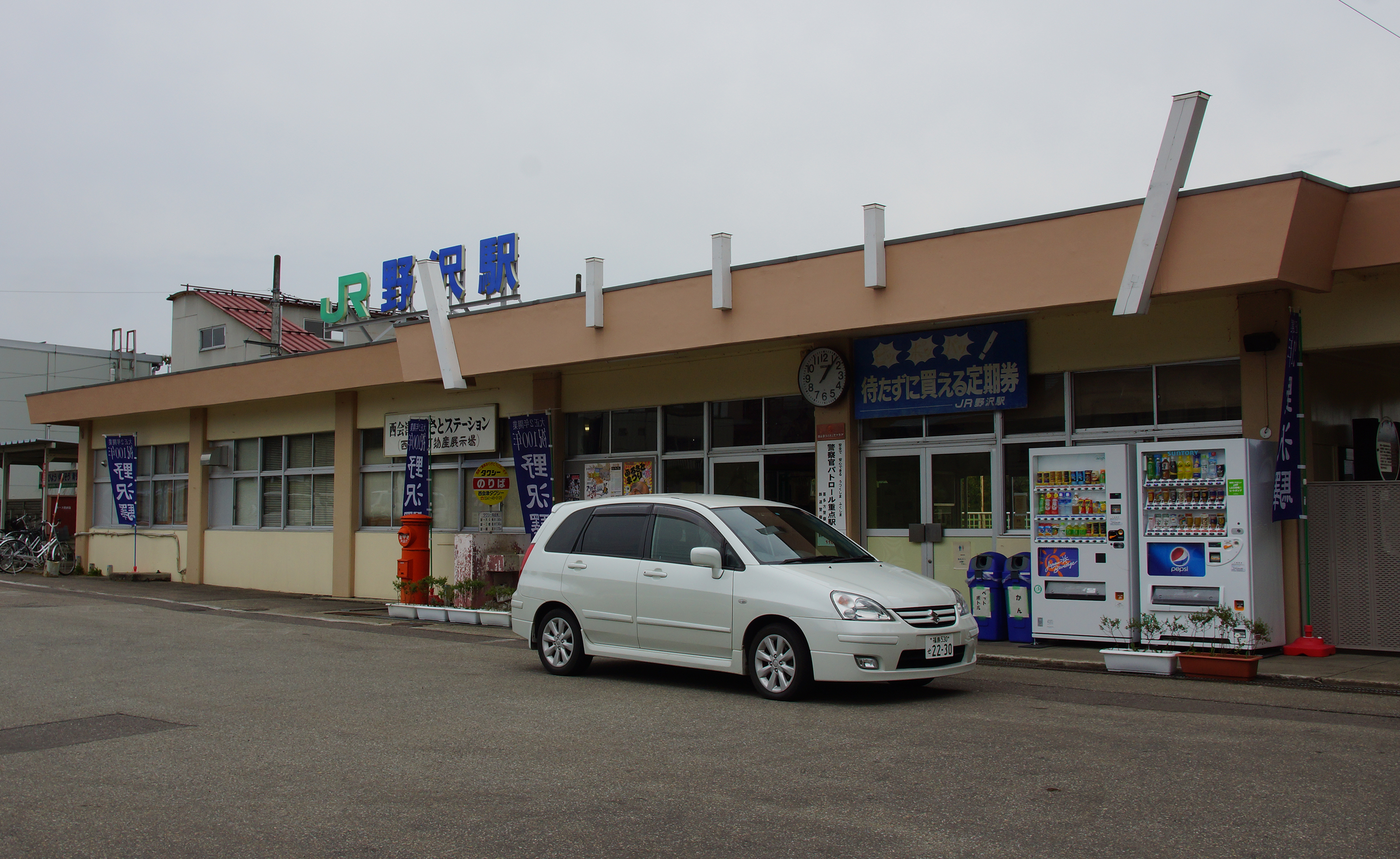
- Nozawa Station, October 2013

General information
- Location: Nozawa Shimokoya Otsu 3183, Nishiaizu-machi, Yama-gun, Fukushima-ken 969-4406; Japan
- Coordinates: 37.5908°N 139.6446°E
- Operator: JR East
- Line: ■ Ban'etsu West Line
- Distance: 106.2 km from Kōriyama
- Platforms: 1side + 1 island platform
- Tracks: 3

Other information
- Status: Staffed
- Website: Official website

History
- Opened: August 1, 1913

Passengers
- FY 2017: 156 daily

Services
Preceding station	JR East	Following station
Kanose towards Niitsu	Ban'etsu West Line Rapid Agano	Ogino towards Aizu-Wakamatsu
Kami-Nojiri towards Niitsu	Ban'etsu West Line Local	Onobori towards Kōriyama
Location
- Location within Fukushima Prefecture Location within Japan

Nozawa Station (野沢駅, Nozawa-eki) is a railway station on the Ban'etsu West Line in the town of Nishiaizu, Yama District, Fukushima Prefecture, Japan, operated by East Japan Railway Company (JR East).

== Lines ==
Nozawa Station is served by the Ban'etsu West Line, and is located 106.2 rail kilometers from the official starting point of the line at Kōriyama.

== Station layout ==
Nozawa Station has one side platform and one island platform, connected to the station building by a footbridge. The station is staffed.

=== Platforms ===
1	■ Ban'etsu West Line	for Gosen and Niitsu
2	■ Ban'etsu West Line	for Kōriyama, Aizu-Wakamatsu
3	■ Ban'etsu West Line	(for trains starting at this station)

== History ==
Nozawa Station opened on August 1, 1913. The station was absorbed into the JR East network upon the privatization of the Japanese National Railways (JNR) on April 1, 1987.

== Passenger statistics ==
In fiscal 2017, the station was used by an average of 156 passengers daily (boarding passengers only).

== Surrounding area ==
- Nishiaizu Town Hall
- National Route 49

== See also ==
- List of railway stations in Japan
