= Battle of Basra (1914) =

WWI battle in Iraq (British vs Ottoman)

- Part of the Mesopotamian campaign of World War I
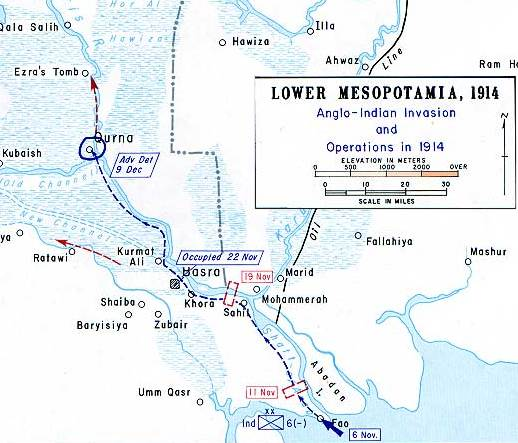
- Map showing the initial British attack and capture of Basra, 1914.
Date	November 11–22, 1914
Location	Basra, Ottoman Iraq 30°25′N 48°01′E
Result	British victory
Territorial changes	British capture of al-Basra

Belligerents
British Empire: United Kingdom; India	Ottoman Empire: Al-Muntafiq

Commanders and leaders
(British Empire) T. E. Lawrence (British Empire) Charles Townshend (British Raj) Arthur Barrett (British Raj) John Eccles Nixon	Mehmed Subhi Bey; Süleyman Askerî

Casualties and losses
500 casualties	1,300 casualties

The Battle of Basra was a battle of World War I which took place south of the city of Basra, in Ottoman Iraq, between British and Ottoman troops from November 11 to November 22, 1914. The battle resulted in the British capture of Basra.

== Background ==
Once the Ottoman Empire entered the war against the allies, the completion of the Berlin–Baghdad railway became a threat to the allies, as the actual origin was Hamburg and the intended terminus Basra. This route from the North Sea to the Indian Ocean posed a major threat to the British Empire which acted promptly to seize Basra and blockade Hamburg. After the capture of Fao by the British, the Ottoman army began to converge on Basra. The British had the mission of securing the Persian oil fields by capturing Basra, and they advanced up the river towards Basra.

== The battle ==
On November 7, 1914, British troops began the march from Fao to Basra. The Ottomans attacked the British camp at dawn on November 11, but were defeated. The Ottomans prepared defensive positions at Saihan, and on November 15 the British attacked. The Ottomans were beaten, suffering 250 casualties and the British continued to advance. The main Ottoman position was at a place the British called Sahil. The Ottomans had 4,500 soldiers dug in near some palm groves and an old mud walled fort. On November 19, the British advanced with two brigades of British and Indian infantry, some artillery and cavalry. Their advance was hampered by a rain storm, which made movement difficult. Ottoman fire, both rifle and artillery, was inaccurate. The British and Indian troops pressed on and when they came close the British artillery finally found the range, bringing fire directly upon the Ottoman trenches. The mud walled fort fell, and with that the entire Ottoman force got up and ran. Due to the condition of the ground, the cavalry was unable to pursue. Ottoman losses were maybe 1,000; the British and Indian troops lost 350. On the river, the British gunboats encountered a launch with a deputation from Basra to tell the British that the city had been abandoned by the Ottomans, asking for troops to occupy it and stop looting. Several battalions were loaded on the gunboats and on November 22, the Indian troops of the 104th Wellesley Rifles and 117th Mahrattas occupied Basra.

== Aftermath ==
The capture of Basra was a major step in protecting the Persian oilfields and refineries. However, the ambiguity of the mission would lead to mission creep that would lead the British to advance up the river.

== Bibliography ==
Notes

References

- Barker, Arthur James (1967). The Bastard War: The Mesopotamian Campaign of 1914-1918. Dial Press. OCLC 2118235. - Total pages: 449
- Townshend, Charles (2011). Desert Hell, The British Invasion of Mesopotamia. Harvard University Press. ISBN 9780674061347. - Total pages: 624
