= Japan National Route 459 =

Road in Japan

National Route 459
- 国道459号
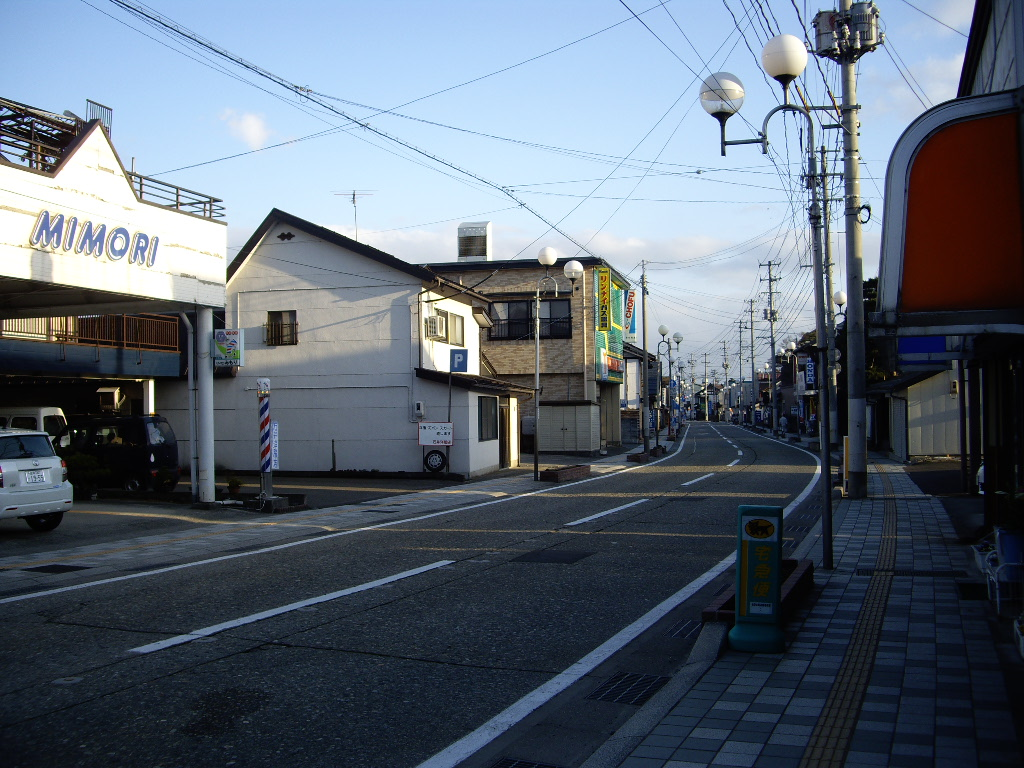

Route information
- Length: 267.8 km (166.4 mi)

Location
- Country: Japan

Highway system
- National highways of Japan; Expressways of Japan
← National Route 458	→ National Route 460

National Route 459 is a national highway of Japan connecting Chūō-ku, Niigata and Namie, Fukushima in Japan, with a total length of 267.8 km (166.4 mi).
