= Igashima Station =

Railway station in Aga, Niigata Prefecture, Japan

Igashima Station 五十島駅
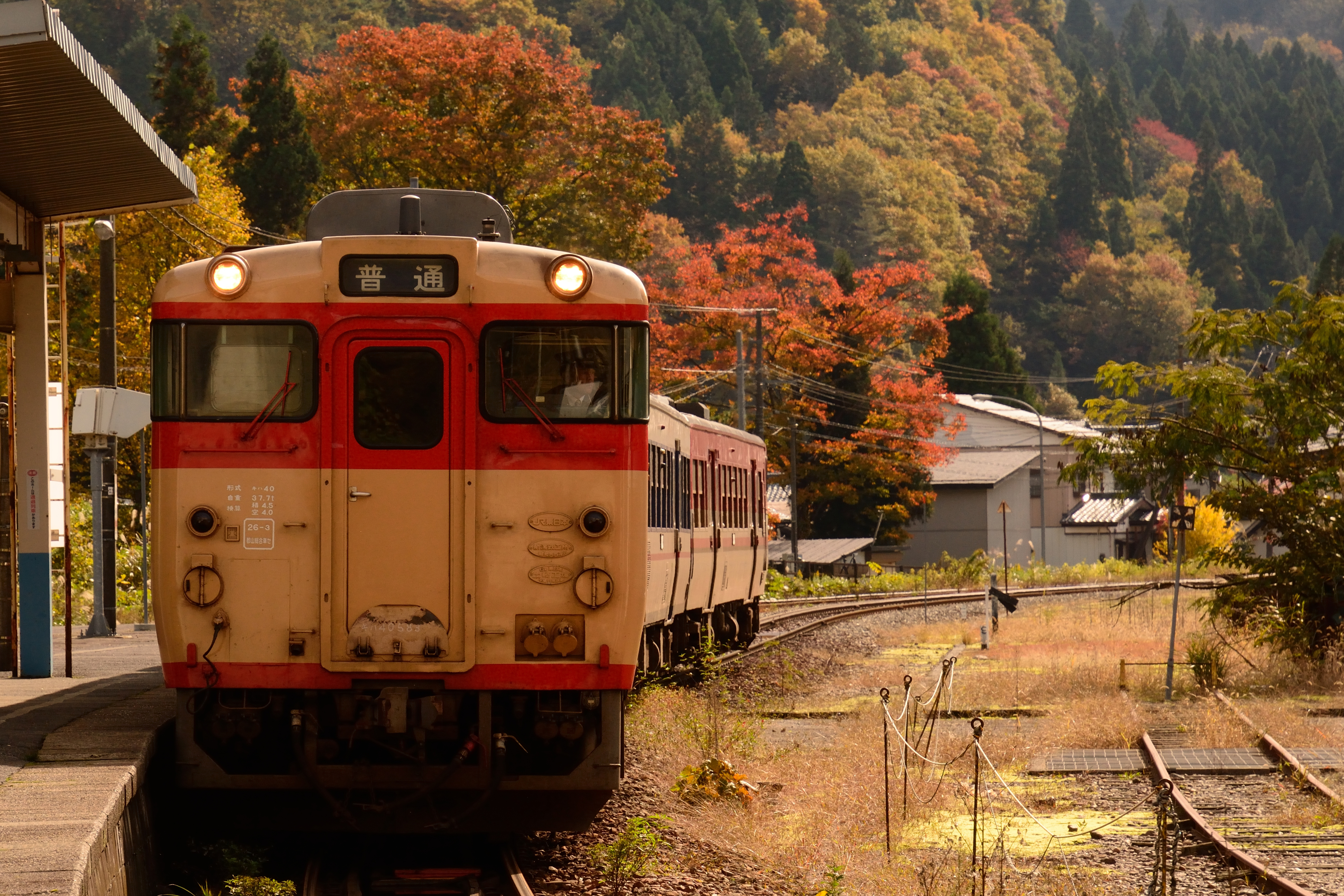
- Platform, November 2014

General information
- Location: Igashima, Aga-machi, Higashikambara-gun, Niigata-ken 959-4614; Japan
- Coordinates: 37°42′57.2″N 139°21′12.6″E
- Operator: JR East
- Line: ■ Ban'etsu West Line
- Distance: 148.6 km from Kōriyama
- Platforms: 1 island platform
- Tracks: 2

Other information
- Status: Unstaffed
- Website: Official website

History
- Opened: 1 June 1913

Services
Preceding station	JR East	Following station
Higashi-Gejō towards Niitsu	Ban'etsu West Line Local	Mikawa towards Kōriyama
Location
- Location within Japan

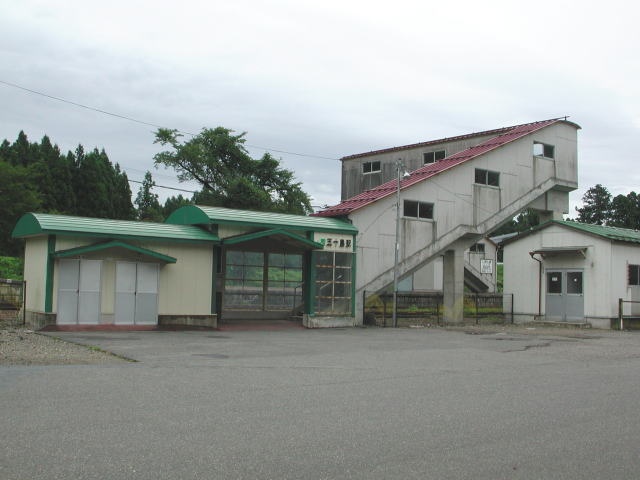
Igashima Station, September 2004

Igashima Station (五十島駅, Igashima-eki) is a railway station in the town of Aga, Higashikanbara District, Niigata Prefecture, Japan, operated by East Japan Railway Company (JR East).

== Lines ==
Igashima Station is served by the Ban'etsu West Line, and is 148.6 kilometers from the terminus of the line at Kōriyama.

== Station layout ==
The station consists of a single unnumbered island platform serving two tracks, connected to the station building by a footbridge. The station is unattended.

=== Platforms ===
entry side	■ Ban'etsu West Line	for Niitsu and Niigata
opposite side	■ Ban'etsu West Line	for Tsugawa and Aizu-Wakamatsu

== History ==
The station opened on 1 June 1913. With the privatization of Japanese National Railways (JNR) on 1 April 1987, the station came under the control of JR East.

== Surrounding area ==
- Igashima Post Office

== See also ==
- List of railway stations in Japan
