= Mikawa =

Mikawa may refer to:

Places in Japan

- Mikawa Province, an old province of Japan
- Mikawa, Yamagata, a town in Yamagata Prefecture
- Mikawa, Ishikawa, former town in Ishikawa Prefecture
- Mikawa, Kumamoto, former town in Kumamoto Prefecture
- Mikawa, Yamaguchi, former town in Yamaguchi Prefecture
- Mikawa, Ehime, former village in Ehime Prefecture
- Mikawa, Niigata, former village in Niigata Prefecture

Surname

- Gunichi Mikawa, admiral in the Imperial Japanese Navy during World War II
- Kenichi Mikawa, Japanese TV star, comedian and singer

Other uses

- Mikawa dialect, dialect of Japanese spoken in Mikawa Province in eastern Aichi Prefecture. It is also known as "Mikawa-ben"

== See also ==
- Mikawa Station (disambiguation)
