= Muroya Cave =

Archaeological site in the Hokuriku region of Japan

- 室谷洞窟 (Japanese)
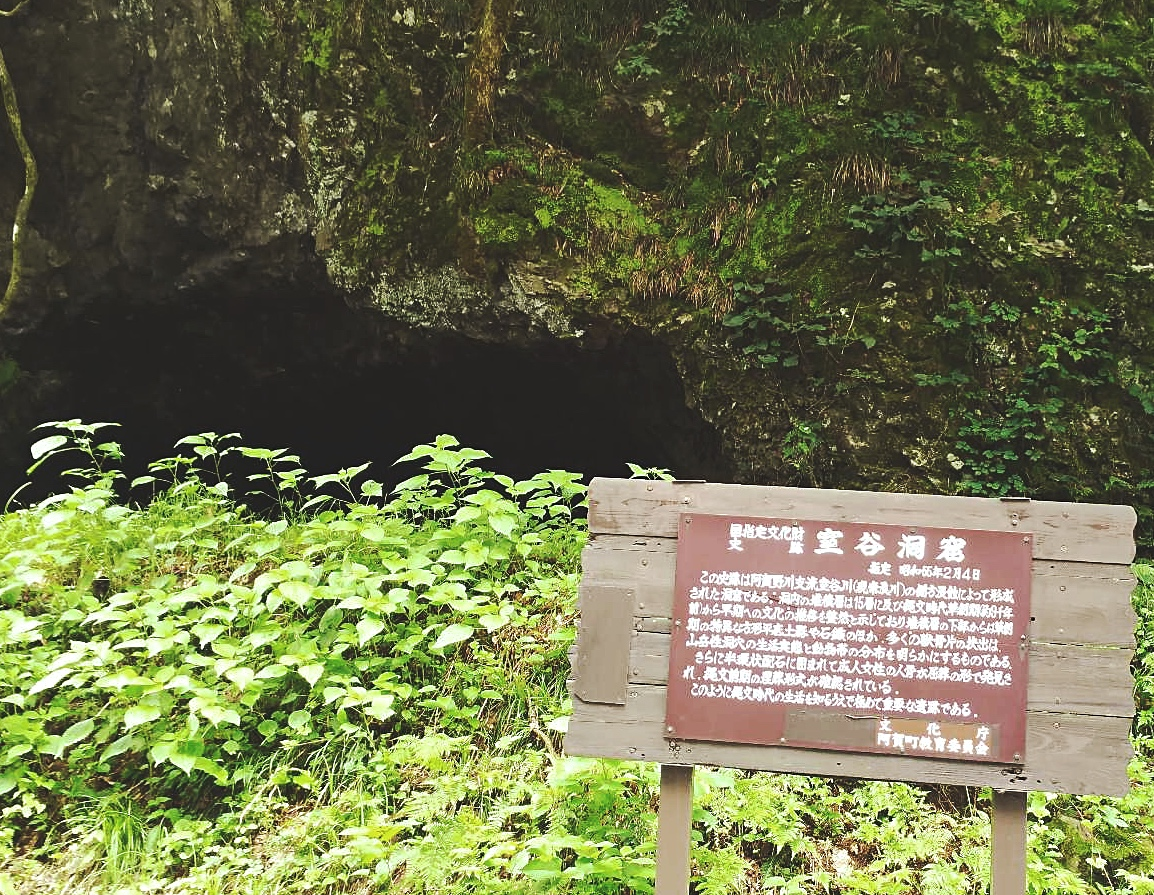
- Muroya Cave

- Muroya Cave Muroya Cave (Japan)
- 37°32′35″N 139°21′46″E
- Type: settlement
- Periods: Jōmon period
- Location: Aga, Niigata, Japan
- Region: Hokuriku region

Site notes
- Public access: Yes (no public facilities)

Muroya Cave (室谷洞窟, Muroya dōkutsu) is an archaeological site consisting of a Jōmon period cave dwelling in the Kamiya neighborhood of the town of Aga, Niigata Prefecture in the Hokuriku region of Japan. The site was designated a National Historic Site of Japan in 1980.

== Overview ==
The cave is located deep in the mountains on the west bank of the Muroya River, one of the tributaries that flows north into the Agano River, which crosses the Echigo Mountains from east to west. It was formed by erosion of a rhyolite outcrop on the river's left bank at an elevation of 218 meters. The opening is to the south and faces a narrow river terrace on its east side. The cave is approximately three meters in height, seven meters in width and extends for eight meters into the mountain. The interior was excavated from 1960 to 1962 by the Nagaoka City Science Museum and the Niigata University School of Medicine, during which time numerous examples of Jōmon pottery from the earliest stage of the Jōmon Period and stone tools and scrapers were discovered.

The cave was found to contain 15 cultural layers. The uppermost layer contained Sue ware and Haji ware and the second layer contained Yayoi pottery. The third layer contained Jōmon pottery and the buried remains of mature women. From the bottom of the third layer to the 15th layer, various early Jōmon pottery styles were found; however, there was a large change in the type of pottery between the 5th and 6th layers. The upper layers had pottery decorated with twisted yarn designs, and the lower layer had a combination of pinnate and rope patterns. Large numbers of animal bones, from serow, rabbits and Asian black bear were also found in the lower strata. Also found were human bones from the earliest and early Jōmon periods, which were dated to be the oldest found within Niigata Prefecture. As so few human remains from this period have been discovered, this was regarded as a valuable find. In total, over 20,000 artifacts were recovered. These artifacts were collectively designated an National Important Cultural Property in 2000. Some of the artifacts are now displayed at the Nagaoka City Science Museum.

The cave is located about two hours by car from Niigata Station; however, there are no facilities at site.

== See also ==
- List of Historic Sites of Japan (Niigata)
- Kosegasawa Cave
