= Aga, Niigata =

Aga 阿賀町
- Town
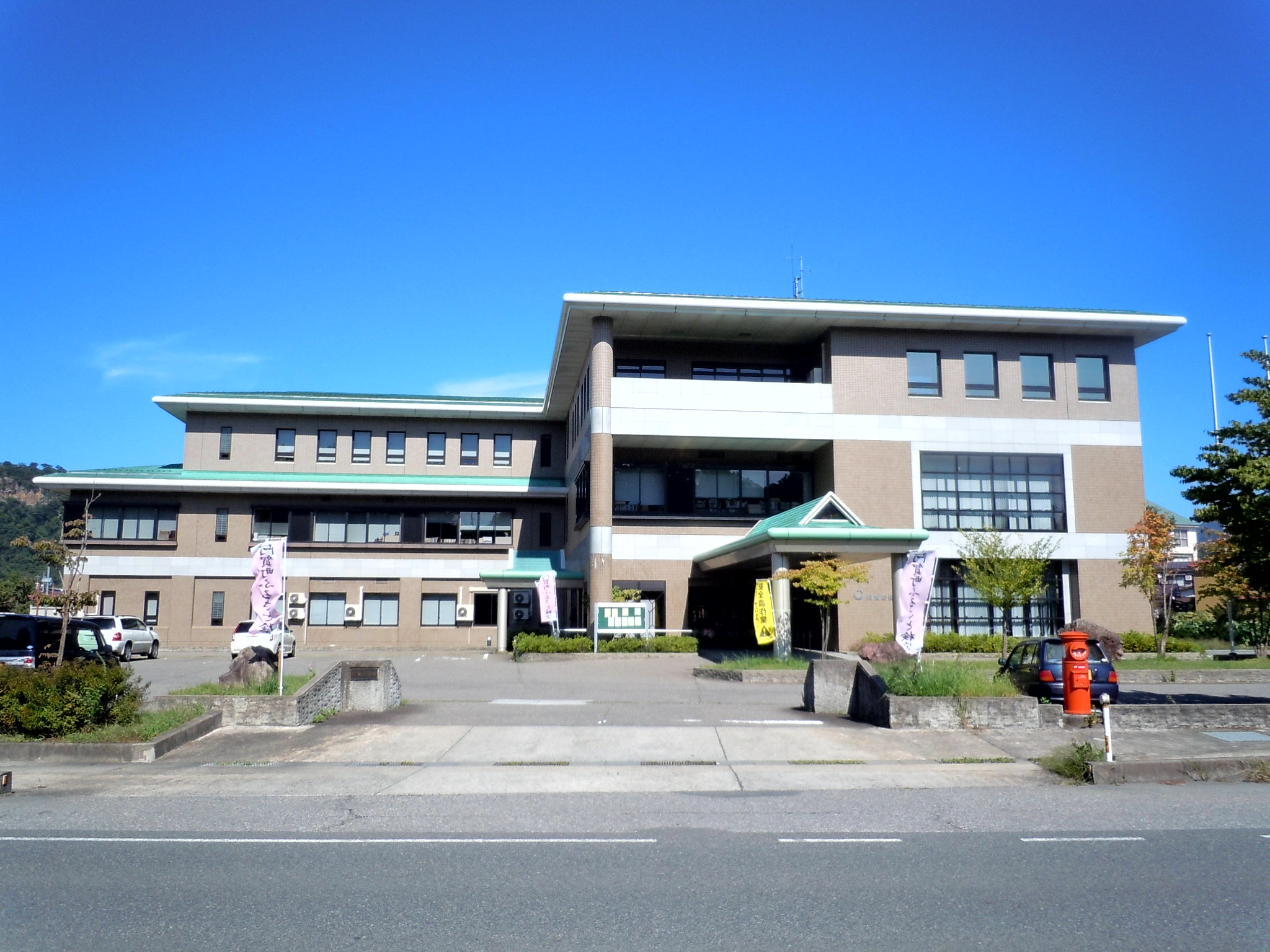
- Aga town hall

- Flag Seal

- Location of Aga in Niigata Prefecture

- Coordinates: 37°40′32″N 139°27′31.6″E
- Country: Japan
- Region: Chūbu (Kōshin'etsu) (Hokuriku)
- Prefecture: Niigata
- District: Higashikanbara

Area
  - Total: 952.89 km^{2} (367.91 sq mi)

Population (November 2020)
  - Total: 10,386
  - Density: 10.899/km^{2} (28.230/sq mi)
- Time zone: UTC+9 (Japan Standard Time)
- Phone number: 0254-92-3111
- Address: 580 Tsugawa, Aga-machi, Higashikanbara-gun, Niigata-ken 959-4402
- Climate: Cfa
- Website: Official website
- Symbols
- Bird: Japanese bush-warbler
- Flower: Camellia
- Tree: Cryptomeria

Aga (阿賀町, Aga-machi) is a town in Niigata Prefecture, Japan. As of 30 November 2020, the town had an estimated population of 10,386 in 4490 households, and a population density of 11 persons per km^{2}. The total area of the town is 952.89 square kilometres (367.91 sq mi).

== Geography ==
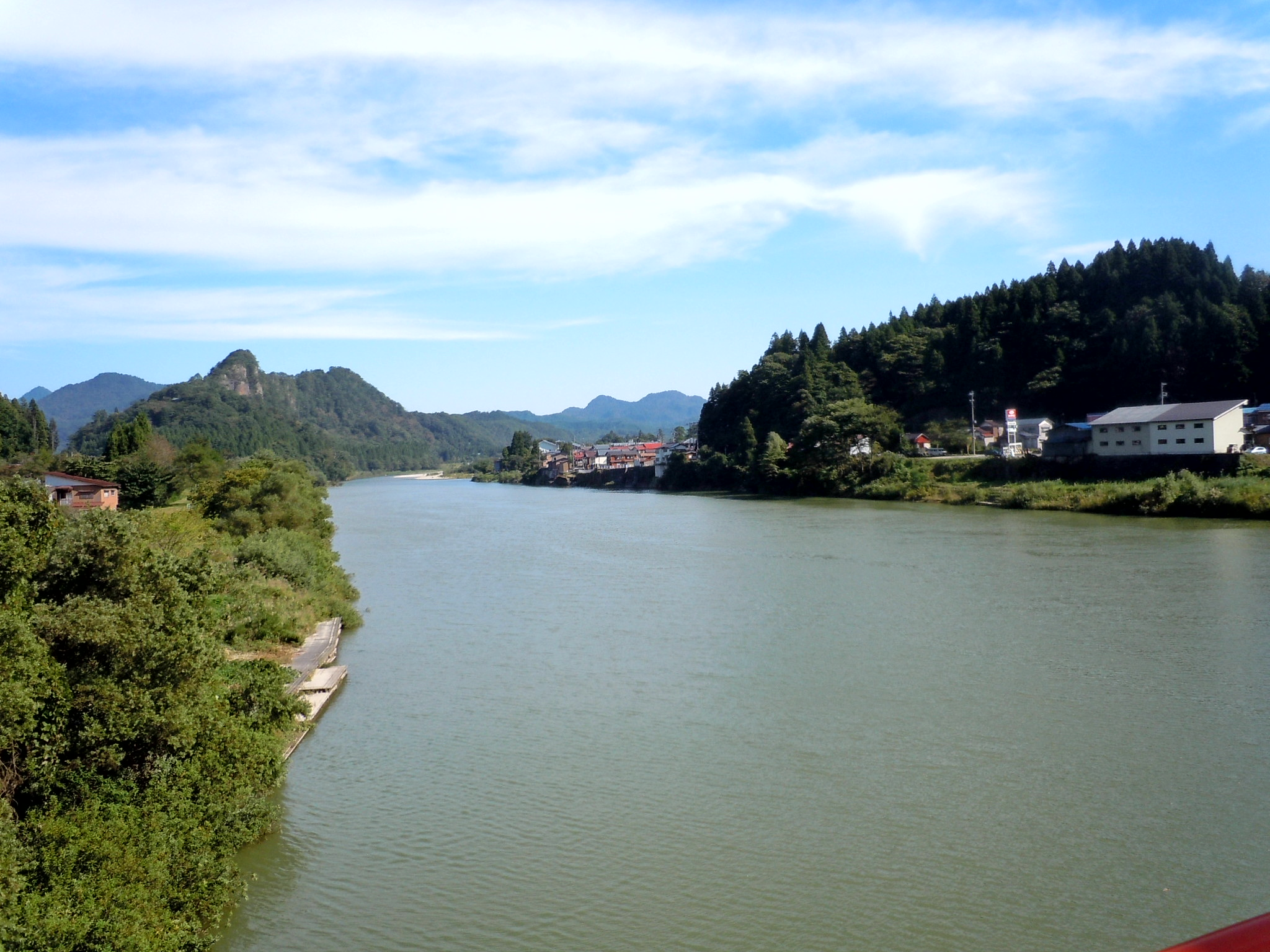
The Agano River flows through the town

Aga is in northeastern Niigata Prefecture. Covering 6.8% in area of the entire prefecture, Aga is the third largest municipality in Niigata after Jōetsu and Murakami. The Agano River and its tributary, the Tokonami River, flow through the center of the town.

=== Surrounding municipalities ===
Fukushima Prefecture

- Kaneyama
- Kitakata
- Nishiaizu
- Tadami

Niigata Prefecture

- Agano
- Gosen
- Sanjō
- Shibata

=== Climate ===
Aga has a humid subtropical climate (Köppen Cfa) characterized by warm, wet summers and cold winters with heavy snowfall. The average annual temperature in Aga is 11.6 °C (52.9 °F). The average annual rainfall is 2,487.6 mm (97.94 in) with September as the wettest month. The temperatures are highest on average in August, at around 24.5 °C (76.1 °F), and lowest in January, at around 2.4 °C (36.3 °F).

Climate data for Tsugawa, Aga, elevation 100 m (330 ft), (1991−2020 normals, extremes 1978−present)
Month	Jan	Feb	Mar	Apr	May	Jun	Jul	Aug	Sep	Oct	Nov	Dec	Year
Record high °C (°F)	15.1 (59.2)	16.4 (61.5)	21.9 (71.4)	31.4 (88.5)	34.6 (94.3)	34.2 (93.6)	36.8 (98.2)	39.4 (102.9)	36.4 (97.5)	30.8 (87.4)	23.0 (73.4)	20.8 (69.4)	39.4 (102.9)
Mean daily maximum °C (°F)	3.4 (38.1)	4.4 (39.9)	8.5 (47.3)	16.2 (61.2)	22.3 (72.1)	25.4 (77.7)	28.5 (83.3)	30.3 (86.5)	25.8 (78.4)	19.3 (66.7)	12.6 (54.7)	6.1 (43.0)	16.9 (62.4)
Daily mean °C (°F)	0.2 (32.4)	0.3 (32.5)	3.1 (37.6)	9.2 (48.6)	15.2 (59.4)	19.5 (67.1)	23.3 (73.9)	24.5 (76.1)	20.2 (68.4)	13.7 (56.7)	7.4 (45.3)	2.4 (36.3)	11.6 (52.9)
Mean daily minimum °C (°F)	−2.7 (27.1)	−3.2 (26.2)	−1.4 (29.5)	2.9 (37.2)	8.9 (48.0)	14.6 (58.3)	19.5 (67.1)	20.3 (68.5)	16.3 (61.3)	9.6 (49.3)	3.5 (38.3)	−0.5 (31.1)	7.3 (45.2)
Record low °C (°F)	−14.5 (5.9)	−16.5 (2.3)	−12.2 (10.0)	−6.3 (20.7)	−0.2 (31.6)	5.1 (41.2)	10.1 (50.2)	10.9 (51.6)	5.6 (42.1)	0.1 (32.2)	−5.0 (23.0)	−10.2 (13.6)	−16.5 (2.3)
Average precipitation mm (inches)	279.3 (11.00)	188.3 (7.41)	169.5 (6.67)	126.0 (4.96)	110.4 (4.35)	160.3 (6.31)	304.8 (12.00)	209.3 (8.24)	155.9 (6.14)	185.2 (7.29)	260.5 (10.26)	324.8 (12.79)	2,487.6 (97.94)
Average snowfall cm (inches)	253 (100)	200 (79)	96 (38)	8 (3.1)	0 (0)	0 (0)	0 (0)	0 (0)	0 (0)	0 (0)	5 (2.0)	115 (45)	658 (259)
Average extreme snow depth cm (inches)	91 (36)	104 (41)	72 (28)	9 (3.5)	0 (0)	0 (0)	0 (0)	0 (0)	0 (0)	0 (0)	3 (1.2)	42 (17)	109 (43)
Average precipitation days (≥ 1.0 mm)	24.0	20.0	20.3	14.5	12.0	12.4	15.4	12.0	13.8	15.5	19.1	23.6	202.6
Average snowy days (≥ 3 cm)	20.3	18.6	11.9	1.1	0	0	0	0	0	0	0.5	9.2	61.6
Mean monthly sunshine hours	40.6	55.6	104.1	162.9	197.9	168.5	151.3	194.6	140.1	112.7	80.0	46.3	1,454.6
Source: Japan Meteorological Agency

== Demographics ==
Per Japanese census data, the population of Aga has declined by nearly three-quarters over the past 70 years.

Historical population
Year	Pop.	±%
1950	38,431	—
1960	35,111	−8.6%
1970	24,632	−29.8%
1980	20,280	−17.7%
1990	17,557	−13.4%
2000	15,813	−9.9%
2010	13,303	−15.9%
2020	9,965	−25.1%

== History ==
4 former municipalities in a merger in 2005 (blue area)

The area of present-day Aga was part of ancient Echigo Province, and was part of the territories held by Aizu Domain under the Edo period Tokugawa shogunate. After the Meiji restoration, the area was organised as part of Higashikanbara District, Niigata. The town of Aga was established on April 1, 2005, in a merger of the towns of Kamikawa and Kanose and the villages of Mikawa, and Tsugawa, all from Higashikanbara District.

== Government ==
Aga has a mayor-council form of government with a directly elected mayor and a unicameral town council of 13 members. Aga, together with the city of Gosen contributes two members to the Niigata Prefectural Assembly. In terms of national politics, the town is part of Niigata 11th district of the lower house of the Diet of Japan.

== Economy ==
The local economy is dominated by agriculture. The Kamikawa (上川) area of Aga is particularly famous for its Koshihikari rice, which is also used to make sake in two local breweries, which are also among the main employers of the district. The Mikawa (三川) area is also famous for mushrooms, and is host to a mushroom park where people can either pick their own mushrooms or choose from a wide variety of locally grown produce.

== Education ==
Aga has three public elementary schools and two public middle school operated by the town government. The town has one public high school operated by the Niigata Prefectural Board of Education.

== Transportation ==
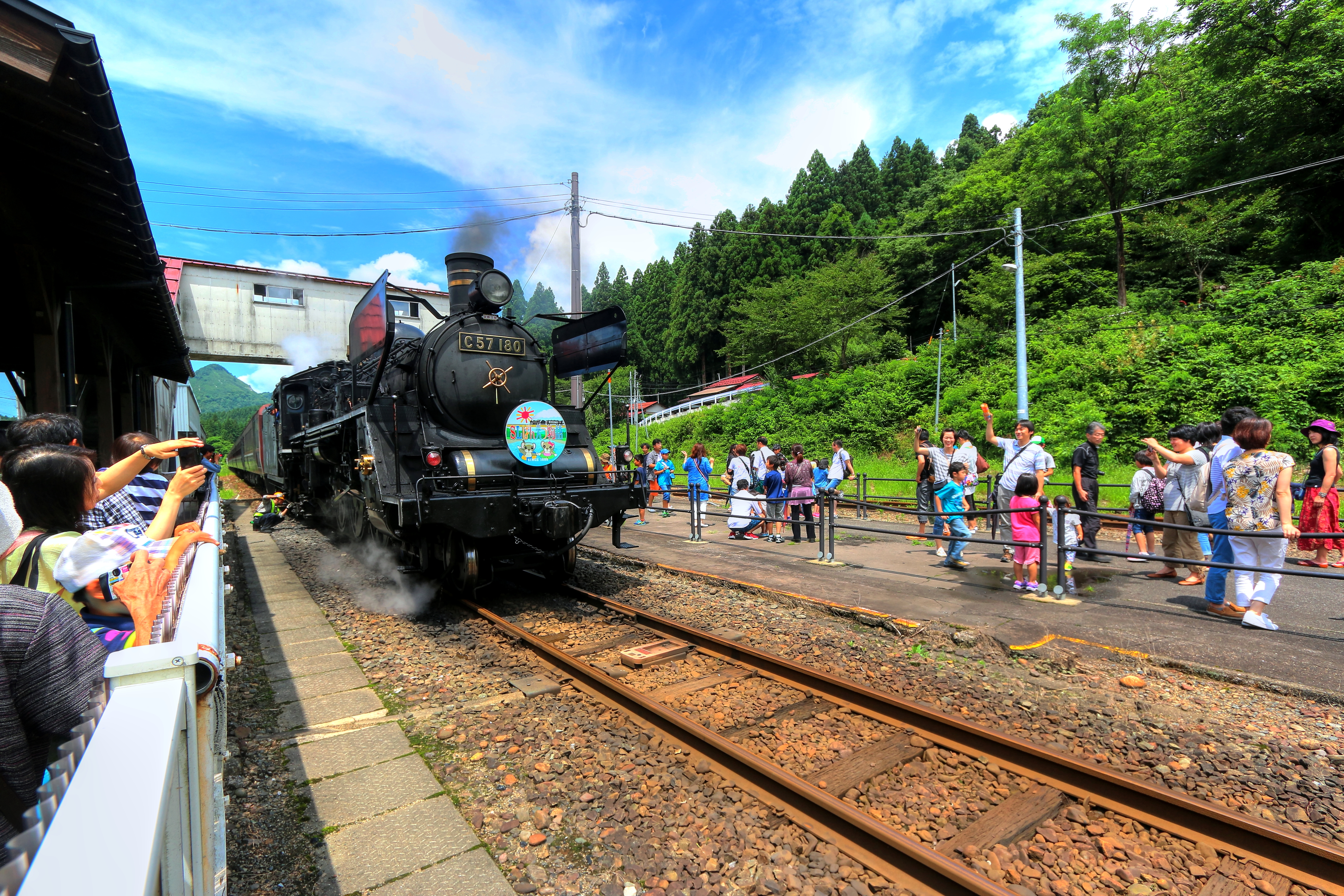
Banetsu Monogatari at Tsugawa Station

=== Railway ===
JR East - Ban'etsu West Line

- Toyomi - Hideya - Kanose - Tsugawa - Mikawa - Igashima - Higashi-Gejō

=== Highway ===
- Ban-etsu Expressway
- National Route 49
- National Route 459

== Local attractions ==
=== National Historic Sites ===
- Kosegasawa Cave, Jōmon period archaeological site
- Muroya Cave, Jōmon period archaeological site
