= Higashi-Gejō Station =

Railway station in Aga, Niigata Prefecture, Japan

Higashi-Gejō Station 東下条駅
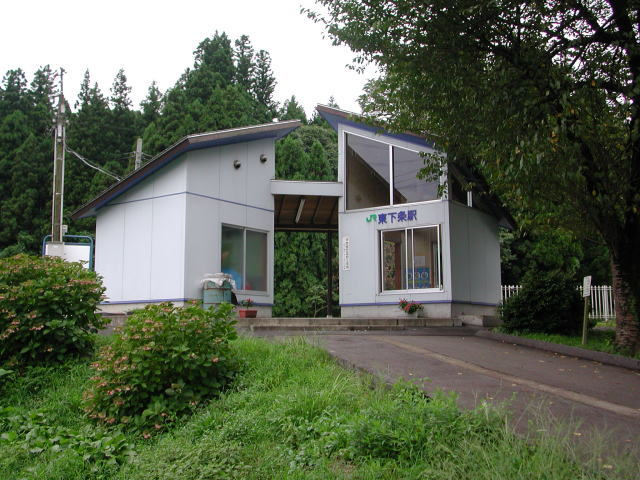
- Higashi-Gejō Station, September 2004

General information
- Location: 3401 Hideya, Aga-machi, Higashikambara-gun, Niigata-ken 959-4634; Japan
- Coordinates: 37.7370°N 139.3219°E
- Operator: JR East
- Line: ■ Ban'etsu West Line
- Distance: 152.5 km from Kōriyama
- Platforms: 1 side platform
- Tracks: 1

Other information
- Status: Unstaffed
- Website: Official website

History
- Opened: 10 January 1953

Services
| Preceding station | JR East | Following station |
|---|---|---|
| Sakihana towards Niitsu | Ban'etsu West Line Local | Igashima towards Kōriyama |
Location
- Location within Japan

Higashi-Gejō Station (東下条駅, Higashi-Gejō-eki) is a railway station in the town of Aga, Higashikanbara District, Niigata Prefecture, Japan, operated by East Japan Railway Company (JR East).

== Lines ==
Higashi-Gejō Station is served by the Ban'etsu West Line, and is 152.5 kilometers from the terminus of the line at Kōriyama.

== Station layout ==
The station consists of one side platform serving a single bi-directional track. The station is unattended.

== History ==
The station opened on 10 January 1953. With the privatization of Japanese National Railways (JNR) on 1 April 1987, the station came under the control of JR East. A new station building was completed in 1995.

== Surrounding area ==
- National Route 49
- Higashi-Gejō Post Office

== See also ==
- List of railway stations in Japan
