= Kosegasawa Cave =

Cave in Aga, Japan

- 小瀬ヶ沢洞窟 (Japanese)
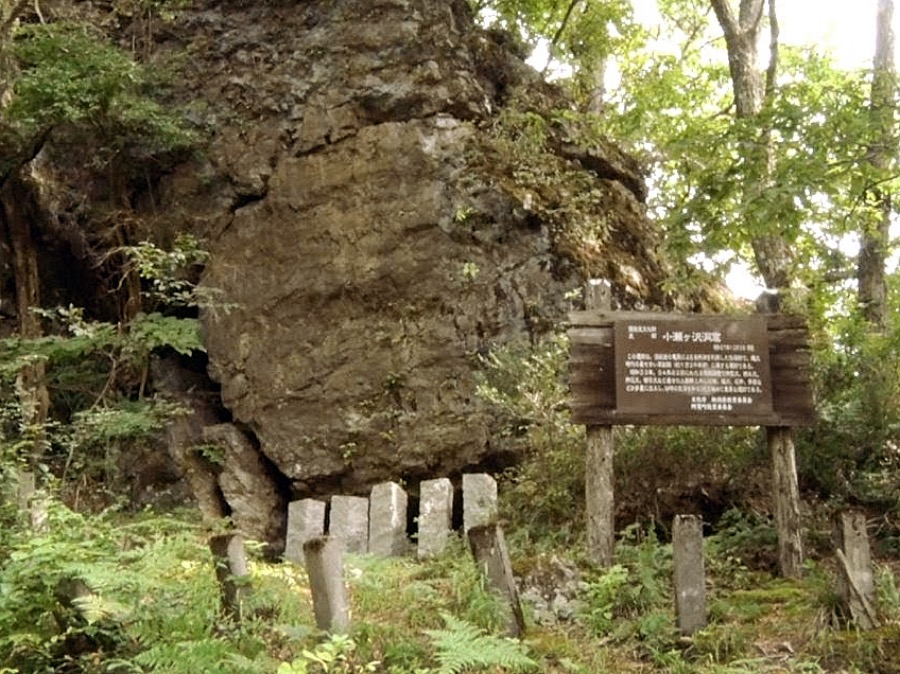
- Kosegasawa Cave

- Kosegasawa Cave Kosegasawa Cave (Japan)
- 37°35′32″N 139°24′18″E
- Type: settlement
- Periods: Jōmon period
- Location: Aga, Niigata, Japan
- Region: Hokuriku region

Site notes
- Public access: Yes (no facilities)

The Kosegasawa Cave (小瀬ヶ沢洞窟, Kosegasawa dōkutsu) is an archaeological site consisting of a Jōmon period cave dwelling in what is now part of the town of Aga, Niigata Prefecture in the Hokuriku region of Japan. The cave was designated a National Historic Site of Japan in 1982.

== Overview ==
The cave is located in the upstream part of the Muroya River, a branch of the Jinna River, and was formed by erosion of a rhyolite outcrop on the river's left bank at an elevation of 200 meters. The cave is approximately 1.5 meters in width and extends for seven meters into the mountain. The interior was excavated from 1958 to 1959, during which time numerous examples of Jōmon pottery from the earliest stage of the Jōmon Period and the stone tools and hunting implements such as projectile points were discovered. The design of some of these artifacts indicated a similarity to projectile points found in the Primorsky Krai region of eastern Siberia.

The artifacts included many lithic flakes (stone waste generated during stone tool production), indicating that this site was a production base for such tools. These items are important materials for clarifying the origins of Jōmon culture and 1350 items were collectively designated an National Important Cultural Property in 2000. The artifacts discovered are displayed at the Nagaoka City Science Museum and at the Age Regional History Museum in former Kamikawa village.

The cave is located about 20 minutes by car from Tsugawa Station on the JR East Ban'etsu West Line. There are no facilities at site.

== See also ==
- List of Historic Sites of Japan (Niigata)
