= Tsugawa Station =

Railway station in Aga, Niigata Prefecture, Japan

Tsugawa Station 津川駅
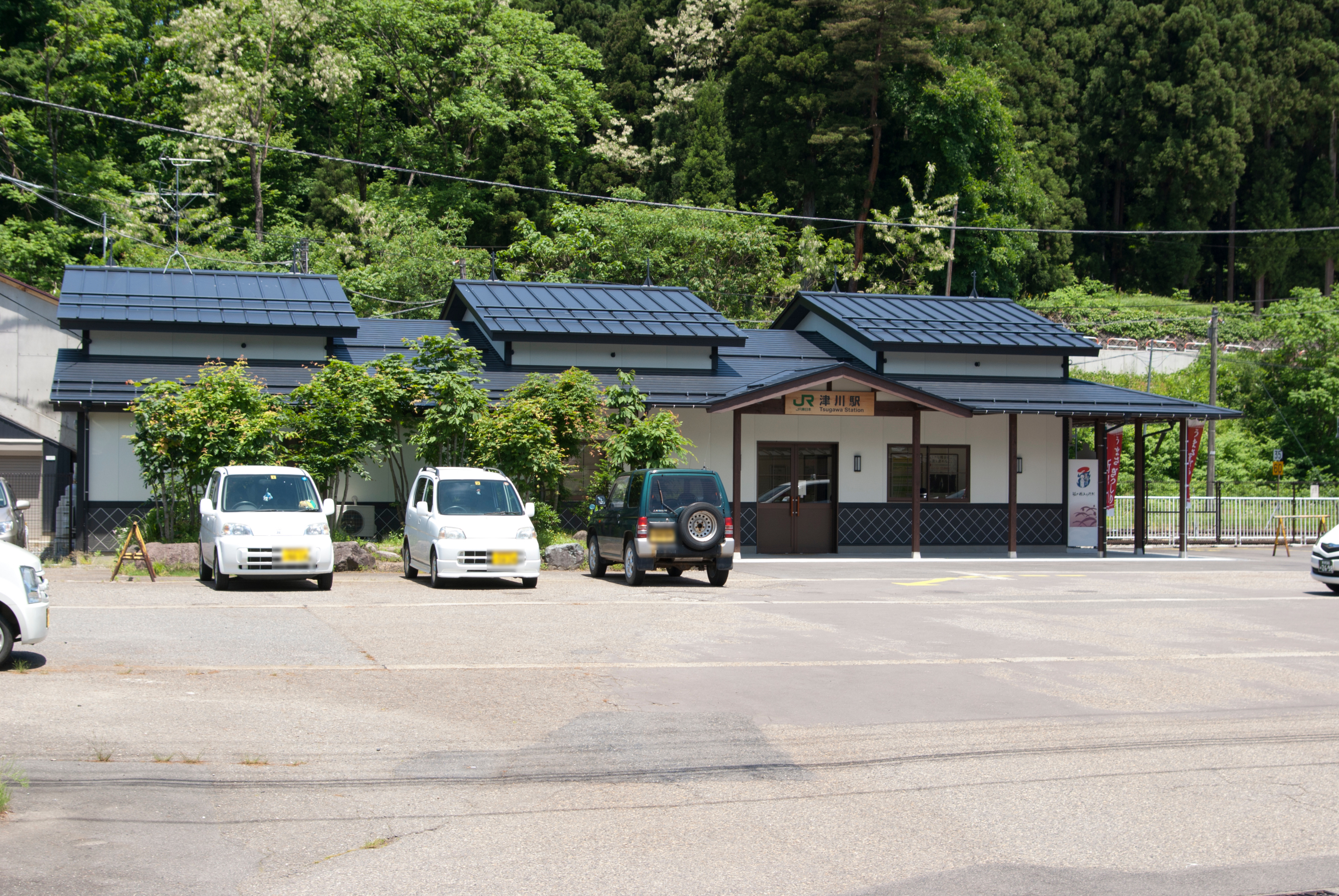
- Tsugawa Station, June 2010

General information
- Location: 127 Tsugawa, Aga-machi, Higashikambara-gun, Niigata-ken 959-4401; Japan
- Coordinates: 37.6881°N 139.4470°E
- Operator: JR East
- Line: ■ Ban'etsu West Line
- Distance: 137.0 km from Kōriyama
- Platforms: 1 island platform
- Tracks: 2

Other information
- Status: Staffed (Midori no Madoguchi)
- Website: Official website

History
- Opened: 1 June 1913; 113 years ago

Passengers
- 175 daily (FY2017)

Services
Preceding station	JR East	Following station
Mikawa towards Niitsu	Ban'etsu West Line Rapid Agano	Kanose towards Aizu-Wakamatsu
Mikawa towards Niitsu	Ban'etsu West Line Local	Kanose towards Kōriyama
Location
- Location within Japan

Tsugawa Station (津川駅, Tsugawa-eki) is a railway station in the town of Aga, Higashikanbara District, Niigata Prefecture, Japan, operated by East Japan Railway Company (JR East).

== Lines ==
Tsugawa Station is served by the Ban'etsu West Line, and is 137.0 kilometers from the terminus of the line at Kōriyama.

== Station layout ==
The station consists of a ground-level island platform serving two tracks, connected to the station building by a footbridge. The station has a Midori no Madoguchi staffed ticket office.

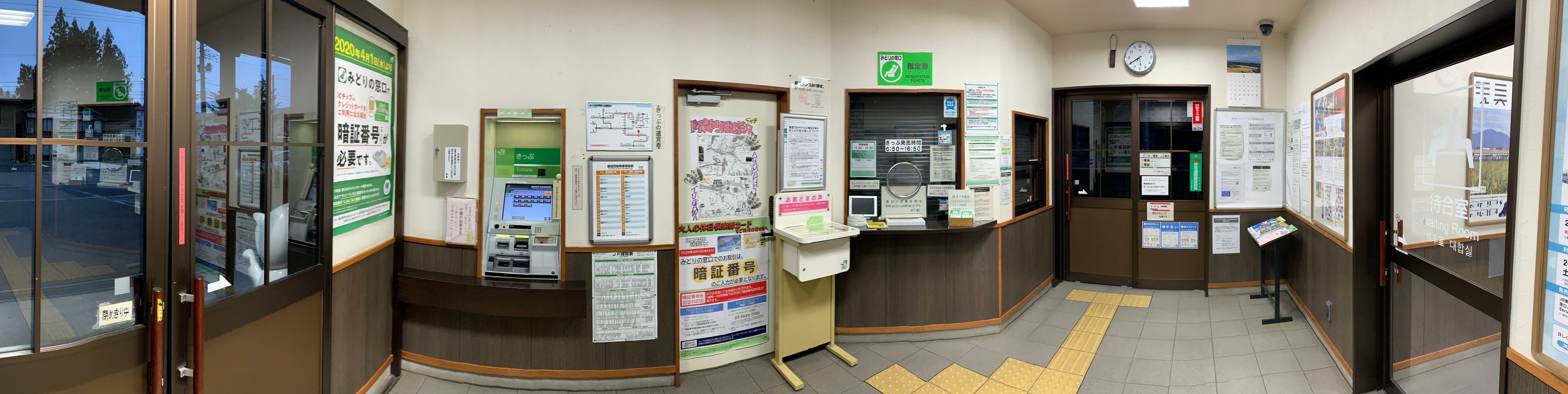
Station interior, March 2020

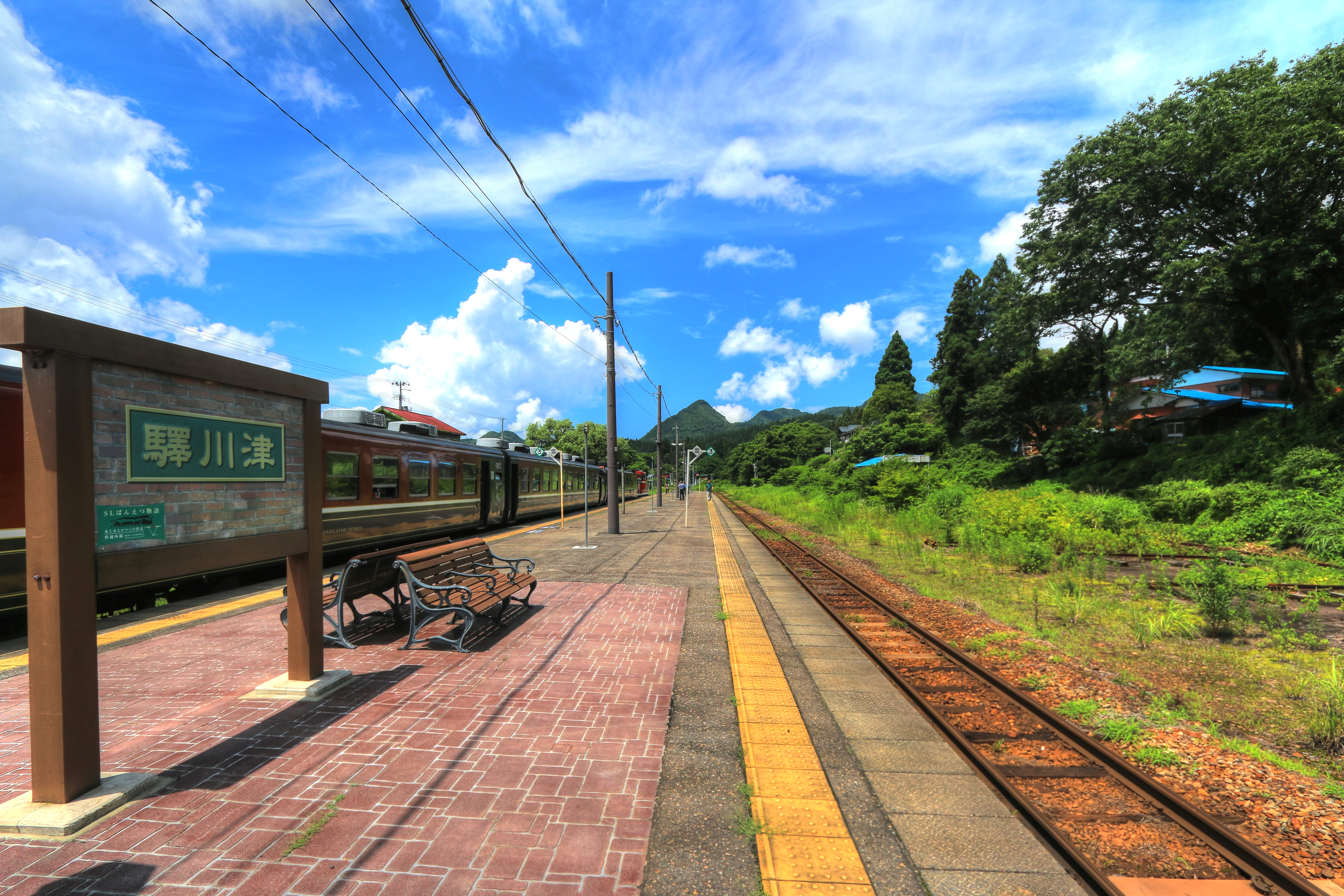
Platform

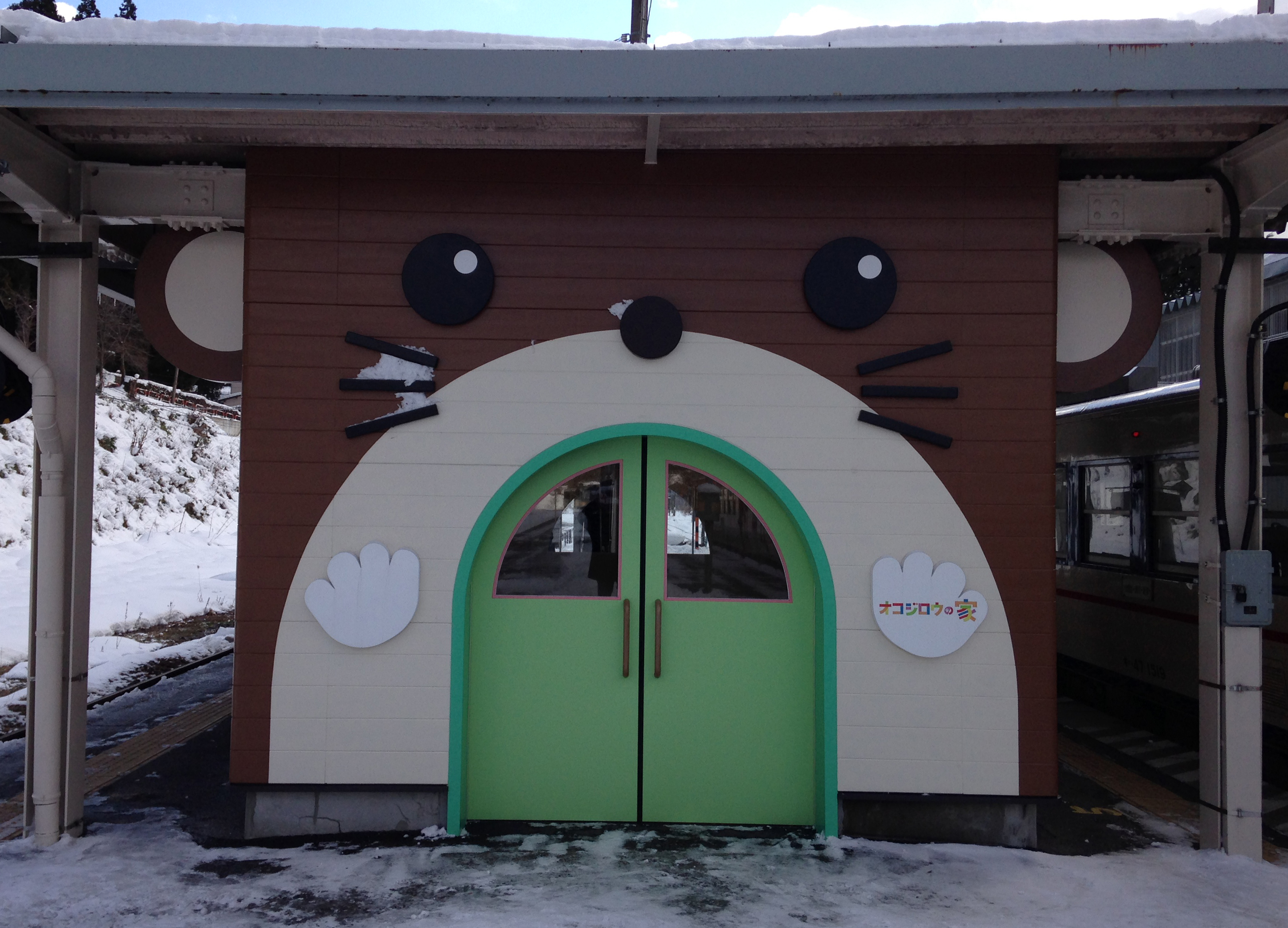
Waiting room on the platform

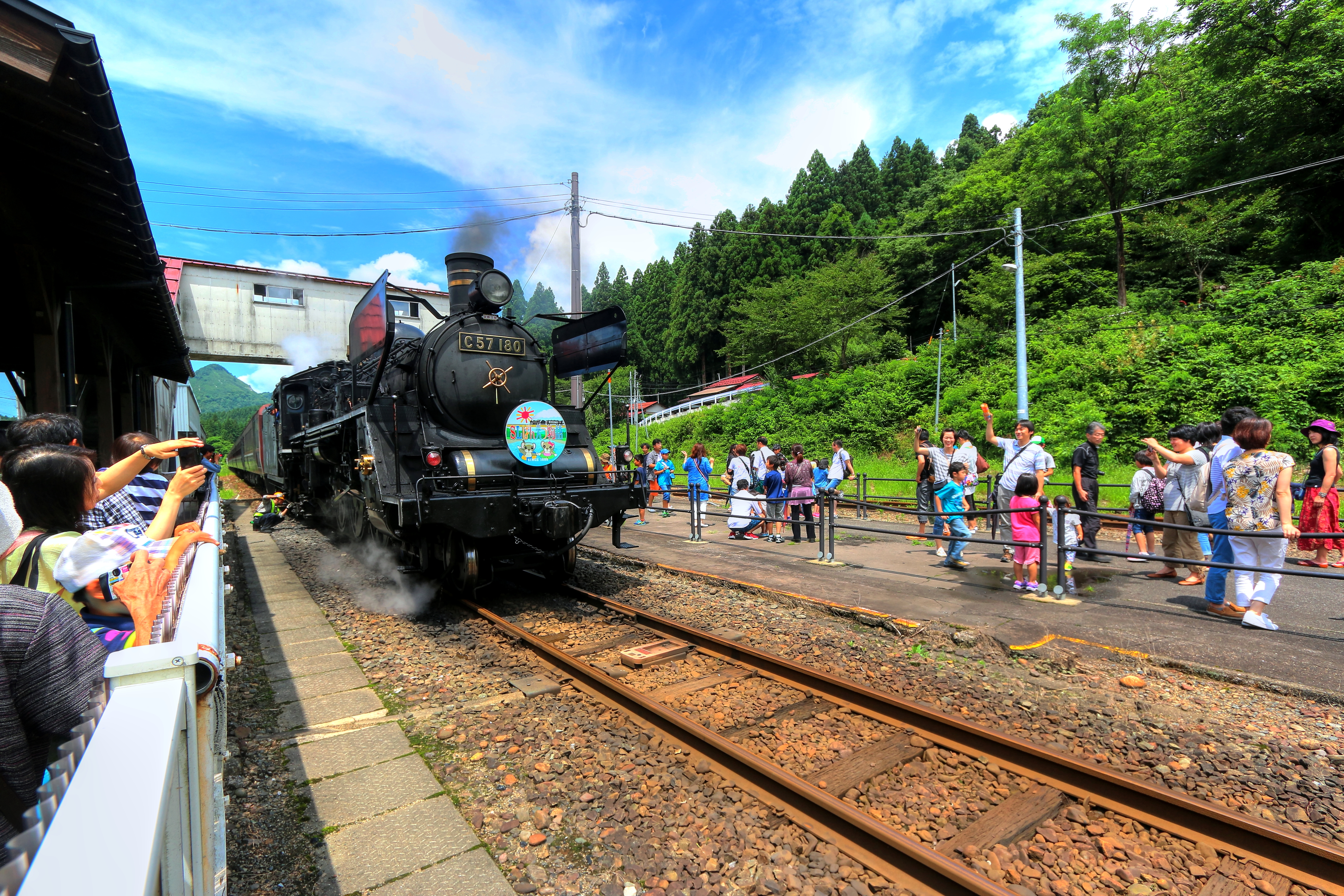
Banetsu Monogatari at Tsugawa Station

=== Platforms ===
1	■ Banetsu West Line	for Gosen and Niitsu
2	■ Banestu West Line	for Nozawa, Kitakata and Aizu-Wakamatsu

== History ==
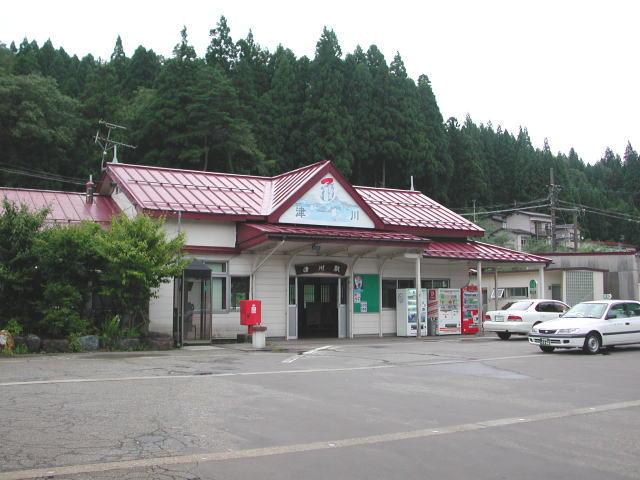
Former building, September 2004

The station opened on 1 June 1913. With the privatization of Japanese National Railways (JNR) on 1 April 1987, the station came under the control of JR East. A new station building was completed in September 2009.

== Passenger statistics ==
In fiscal 2017, the station was used by an average of 787 passengers daily (boarding passengers only).

== Surrounding area ==
- Aga Town Hall
- Agano River
- National Route 459
- National Route 49
- Toyomi Post Office

== See also ==
- List of railway stations in Japan
