= Mikawa Station =

Mikawa Station is the name of three train stations in Japan:

- Mikawa Station (Hokkaido) (三川駅)
- Mikawa Station (Ishikawa) (美川駅)
- Mikawa Station (Niigata) (三川駅)
