= Tsugawa, Niigata =

Dissolved municipality in Niigata prefecture, Japan

Coordinates: 37°41′N 139°28′E

Tsugawa (津川町, Tsugawa-machi) was a town located in Higashikanbara District, Niigata Prefecture, Japan.

As of 2003, the town had an estimated population of 5,000 and a density of 59.39 persons per km^{2}. The total area was 84.19 km^{2}.

On April 1, 2005, Tsugawa, along with the town of Kanose, and the villages of Kamikawa and Mikawa (all from Higashikanbara District) were merged to create the town of Aga.

== Climate ==
Climate data for Tsugawa, Niigata (1981-2010)
Month	Jan	Feb	Mar	Apr	May	Jun	Jul	Aug	Sep	Oct	Nov	Dec	Year
Mean daily maximum °C (°F)	3.5 (38.3)	4.3 (39.7)	8.2 (46.8)	16.3 (61.3)	22.0 (71.6)	25.3 (77.5)	28.4 (83.1)	30.6 (87.1)	25.7 (78.3)	19.2 (66.6)	12.6 (54.7)	6.5 (43.7)	16.9 (62.4)
Daily mean °C (°F)	0.1 (32.2)	0.4 (32.7)	3.0 (37.4)	9.3 (48.7)	15.0 (59.0)	19.4 (66.9)	23.2 (73.8)	24.7 (76.5)	20.1 (68.2)	13.5 (56.3)	7.3 (45.1)	2.6 (36.7)	11.6 (52.8)
Mean daily minimum °C (°F)	−2.9 (26.8)	−3.2 (26.2)	−1.6 (29.1)	2.9 (37.2)	8.7 (47.7)	14.4 (57.9)	19.1 (66.4)	20.2 (68.4)	16.0 (60.8)	9.2 (48.6)	3.2 (37.8)	−0.5 (31.1)	7.1 (44.8)
Average precipitation mm (inches)	271.6 (10.69)	181.0 (7.13)	166.8 (6.57)	114.3 (4.50)	120.3 (4.74)	156.8 (6.17)	268.2 (10.56)	193.0 (7.60)	165.4 (6.51)	180.4 (7.10)	260.6 (10.26)	299.3 (11.78)	2,377.7 (93.61)
Average snowfall cm (inches)	274 (108)	215 (85)	115 (45)	14 (5.5)	0 (0)	0 (0)	0 (0)	0 (0)	0 (0)	0 (0)	4 (1.6)	109 (43)	731 (288.1)
Source: Japan Meteorological Agency
