= Kanose, Niigata =

Dissolved municipality in Higashikanbara district, Niigata prefecture, Japan

Coordinates: 37°41′N 139°29′E

Kanose (鹿瀬町, Kanose-machi) was a town located in Higashikanbara District, Niigata Prefecture, Japan.

In 2003, the town had an estimated population of 2,753 and a population density of 10.68 per km^{2}. The total area was 257.69 km^{2}.

On April 1, 2005, Kanose, along with the town of Tsugawa, and the villages of Kamikawa and Mikawa (all from Higashikanbara District) were merged to create the town of Aga.

In 1964, a chemical factory in the village released methylmercury into the Agano River and caused Niigata Minamata disease.
