= Sakihana Station =

Railway station in Gosen, Niigata Prefecture, Japan

Sakihana Station 咲花駅
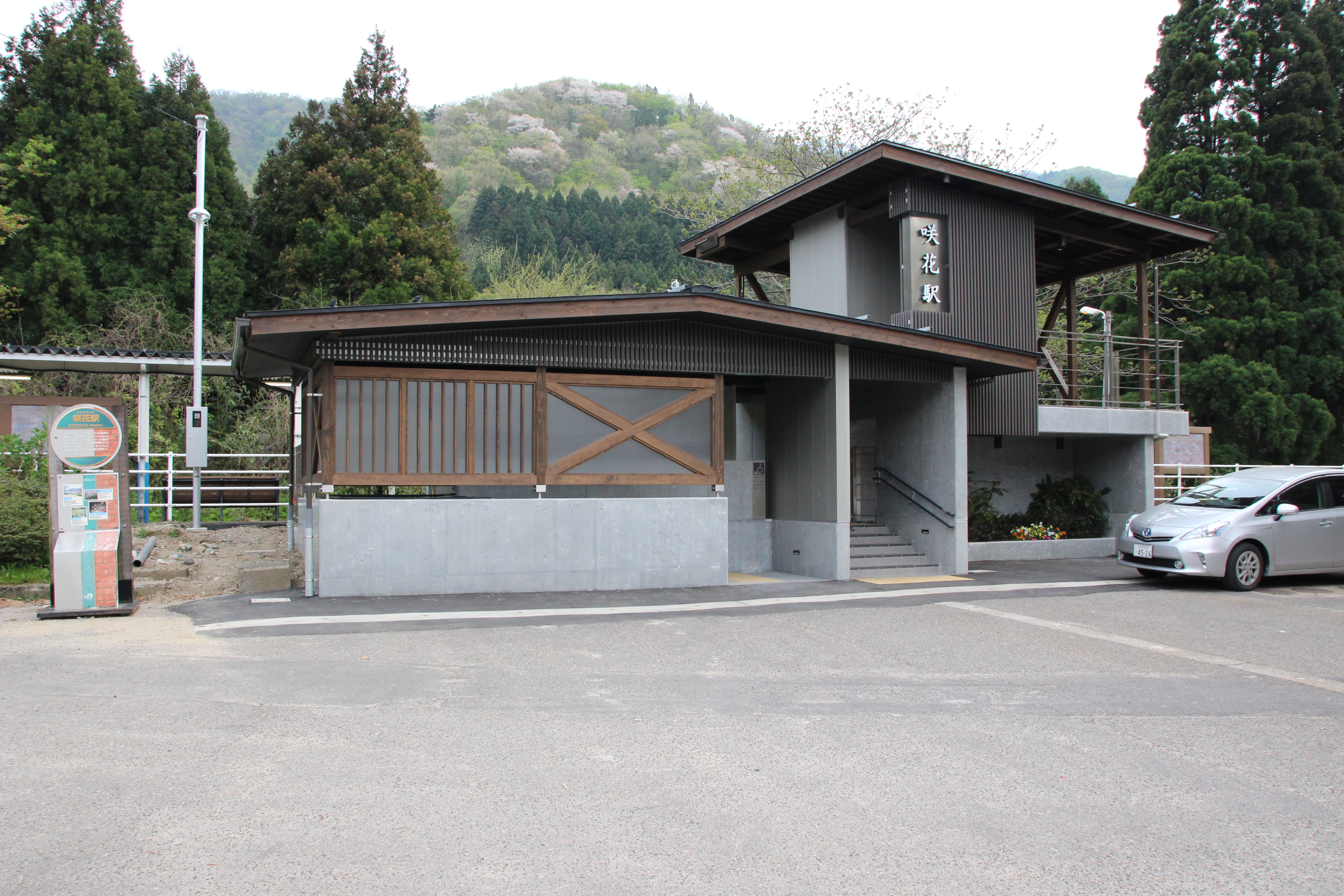
- Sakihana Station, May 2014

General information
- Location: Satori, Gosen-shi, Niigata-ken 959-1615; Japan
- Coordinates: 37.7349°N 139.2910°E
- Operator: JR East
- Line: ■ Ban'etsu West Line
- Distance: 155.6 km from Kōriyama
- Platforms: 1 side platform
- Tracks: 1

Other information
- Status: Unstaffed
- Website: Official website

History
- Opened: 1 November 1961

Services
Preceding station	JR East	Following station
Maoroshi towards Niitsu	Ban'etsu West Line Rapid Agano	Mikawa towards Aizu-Wakamatsu
Maoroshi towards Niitsu	Ban'etsu West Line Local	Higashi-Gejō towards Kōriyama
Location
- Location within Japan

Sakihana Station (咲花駅, Sakihana-eki) is a railway station in the city of Gosen, Niigata, Japan, operated by East Japan Railway Company (JR East).

== Lines ==
Sakihana Station is served by the Ban'etsu West Line, and is 155.6 kilometers from the terminus of the line at Kōriyama.

== Station layout ==
The station consists of a single ground-level side platform serving one bi-directional track. The station is unattended.

== History ==
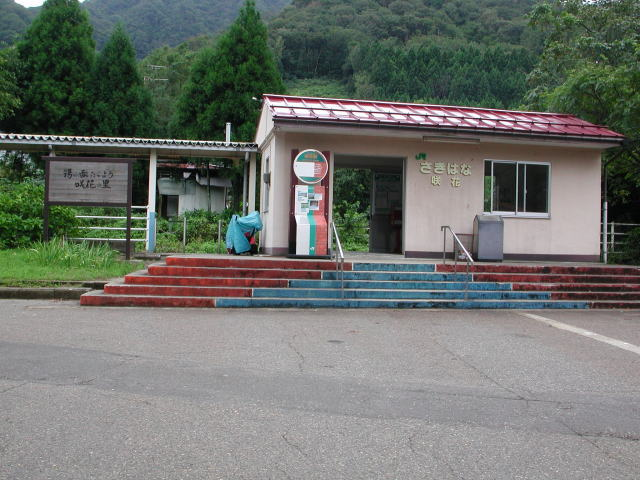
Former building, September 2004

The station opened on 1 November 1961. With the privatization of Japanese National Railways (JNR) on 1 April 1987, the station came under the control of JR East. A new station building was completed in April 2014.

== Surrounding area ==
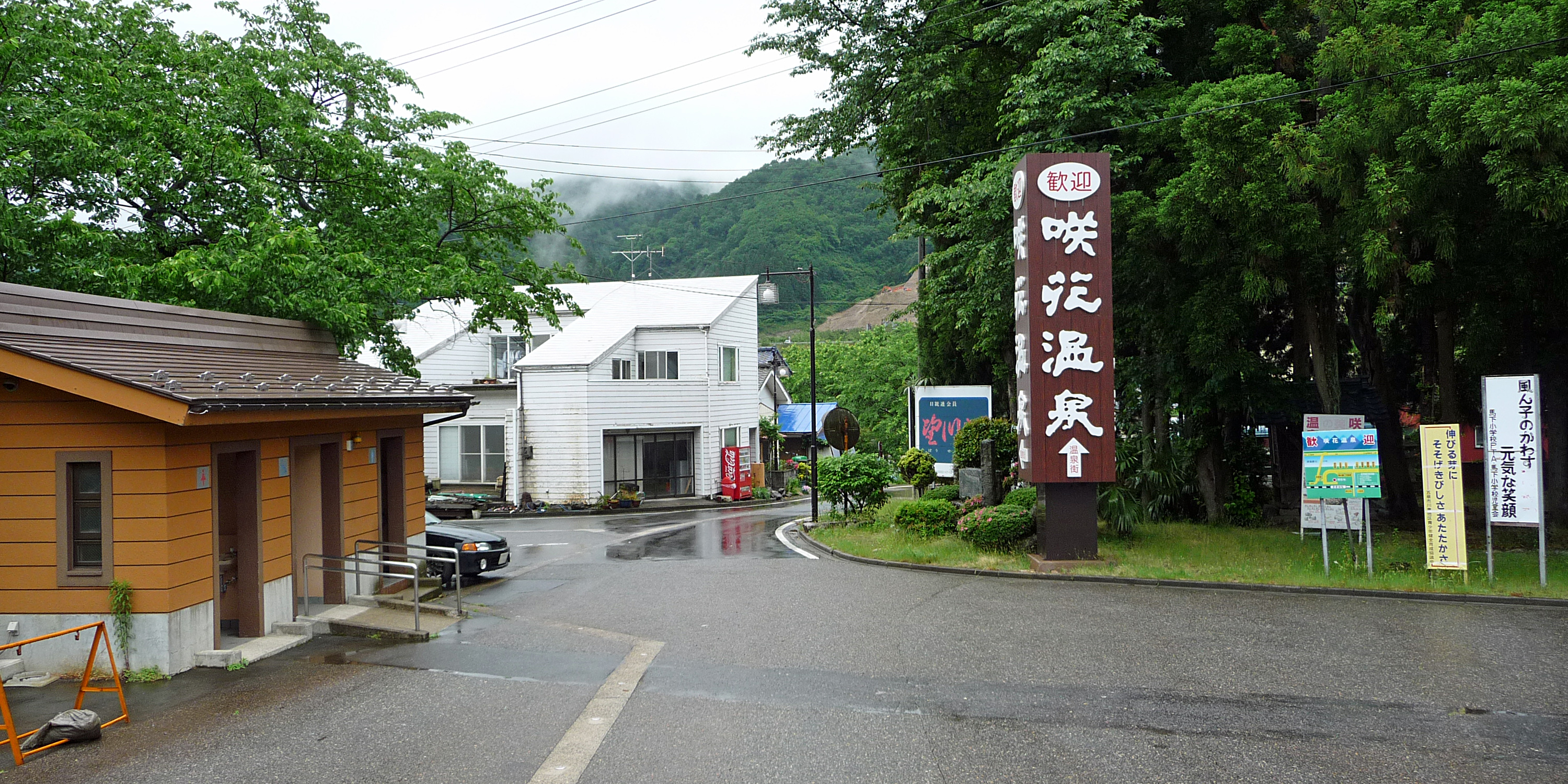
Entrance of Sakihana Onsen

- Sakihana Onsen
