= Mikawa, Niigata =

Dissolved municipality in Niigata prefecture, Japan

Coordinates: 37.75°N 139.413°E

Mikawa (三川村, Mikawa-mura) was a village located in Higashikanbara District, Niigata, Japan.

As of 2003, the village had an estimated population of 4,116 and a density of 16.47 persons per km^{2}. The total area was 249.87 km^{2}.

On April 1, 2005, Mikawa, along with the towns of Kanose and Tsugawa, and the village of Kamikawa (all from Higashikanbara District) were merged to create the town of Aga.
