= Kamikawa, Niigata =

Dissolved municipality in Niigata prefecture, Japan

Kamikawa (上川村, Kamikawa-mura) was a village located in Higashikanbara District, Niigata Prefecture, Japan.

As of 2003, the village had an estimated population of 3,216 and a density of 8.91 persons per km^{2}. The total area was 361.13 km^{2}.

On April 1, 2005, Kamikawa, along with the towns of Kanose and Tsugawa, and the village of Mikawa (all from Higashikanbara District) were merged to create the town of Aga.
