= Mikawa Station (Niigata) =

Railway station in Aga, Niigata Prefecture, Japan

Mikawa Station 三川駅
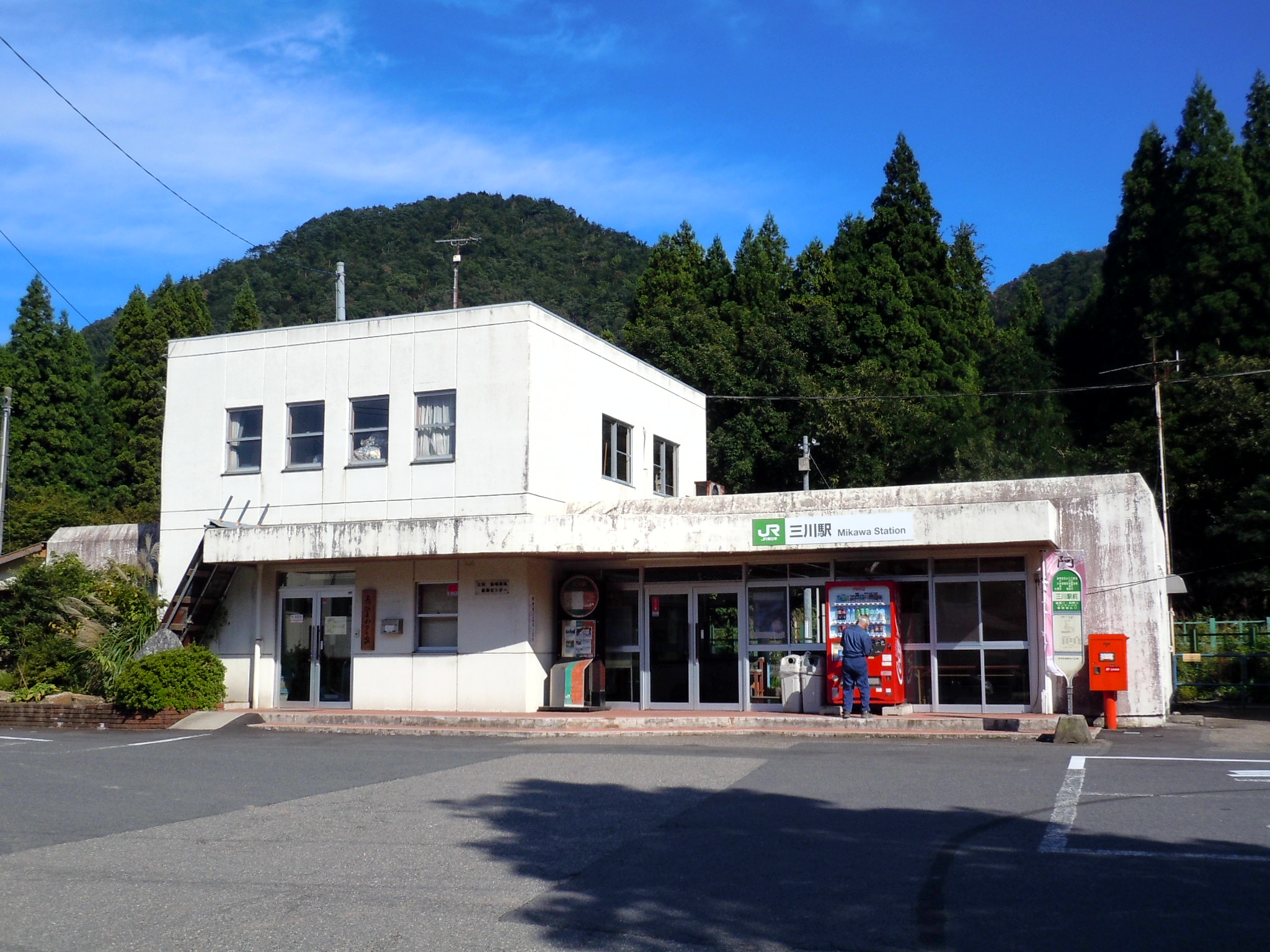
- Mikawa Station, October 2010

General information
- Location: Shirasaki, Aga-machi, Higashikambara-gun, Niigata-ken 959-4622; Japan
- Coordinates: 37°42′29″N 139°22′53″E
- Operator: JR East
- Line: ■ Ban'etsu West Line
- Distance: 144.4 km from Kōriyama
- Platforms: 1 side platform
- Tracks: 1

Other information
- Status: Unstaffed
- Website: Official website

History
- Opened: 1 June 1913
- Former names: Shirosaki Station (until 1985)

Services
Preceding station	JR East	Following station
Sakihana towards Niitsu	Ban'etsu West Line Rapid Agano	Tsugawa towards Aizu-Wakamatsu
Igashima towards Niitsu	Ban'etsu West Line Local	Tsugawa towards Kōriyama
Location
- Location within Japan

Mikawa Station (三川駅, Mikawa-eki) is a railway station in Shirasaki, Aga-machi, in Niigata Prefecture, Japan. The station is operated by East Japan Railway Company (JR East).

== Lines ==
Mikawa Station is served by the Ban'etsu West Line, and is 144.4 kilometers from the terminus of the line at Kōriyama.

== Station layout ==
The station consists of one side platform serving a single bi-directional track. The station is unattended.

== History ==
The station opened on 1 June 1913 as Shirosaki Station (白崎駅). It was renamed to its present name on 14 March 1985. With the privatization of Japanese National Railways (JNR) on 1 April 1987, the station came under the control of JR East.

== Surrounding area ==
- Aga Mikawa Elementary School
- National Route 49
- former Mikawa village hall

== See also ==
- List of railway stations in Japan
