= Banetsu Monogatari =

Set of railway coaches operated in Japan

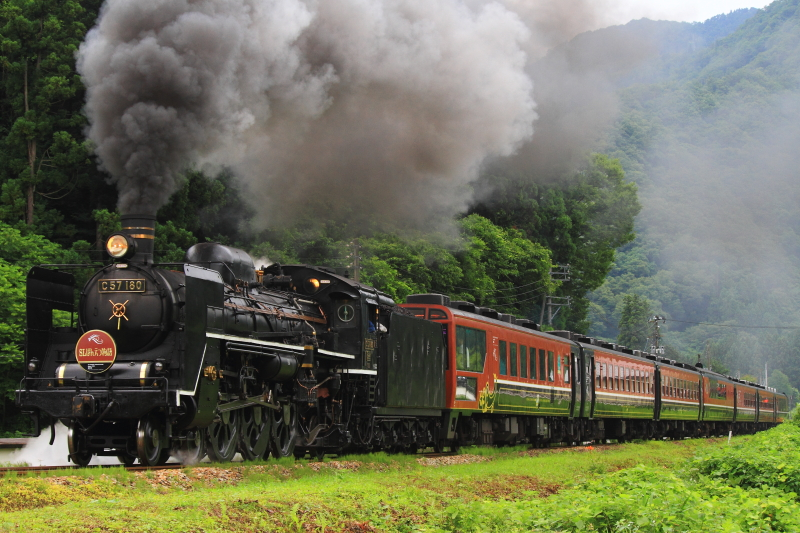
- C57 180 on an SL Banetsu Monogatari service in July 2015

Overview
- Service type: Joyful Train
- Status: Operational
- Locale: Japan
- First service: 29 April 1999
- Current operator: JR East

Route
- Termini: Niigata; Aizu-Wakamatsu

On-board services
- Class: Standard + Green
- Seating arrangements: 2+2 (standard), 2+1 (Green)
- Observation facilities: Cars 1 and 7

Technical
- Rolling stock: 12 series coaches
- Track gauge: 1,067 mm (3 ft 6 in)

The Banetsu Monogatari (ばんえつ物語, Ban'etsu Monogatari) is a locomotive-hauled set of "Joyful Train" railway coaches operated in Japan by the East Japan Railway Company (JR East), normally between Niigata and Aizu-Wakamatsu.

== Operations ==
The Banetsu Monogatari trainset is normally used on SL Banetsu Monogatari excursion services between Niigata and Aizu-Wakamatsu, hauled by the JNR Class C57 steam locomotive C57 180. It is also occasionally used on other excursion services.

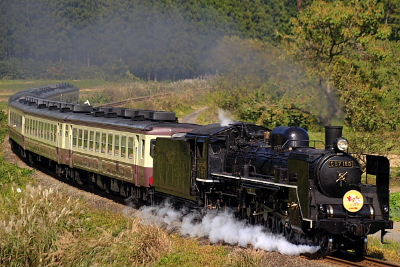
JR East class C57 steam locomotive C57 180 on an SL Banetsu Monogatari working (original livery before refurbishment)

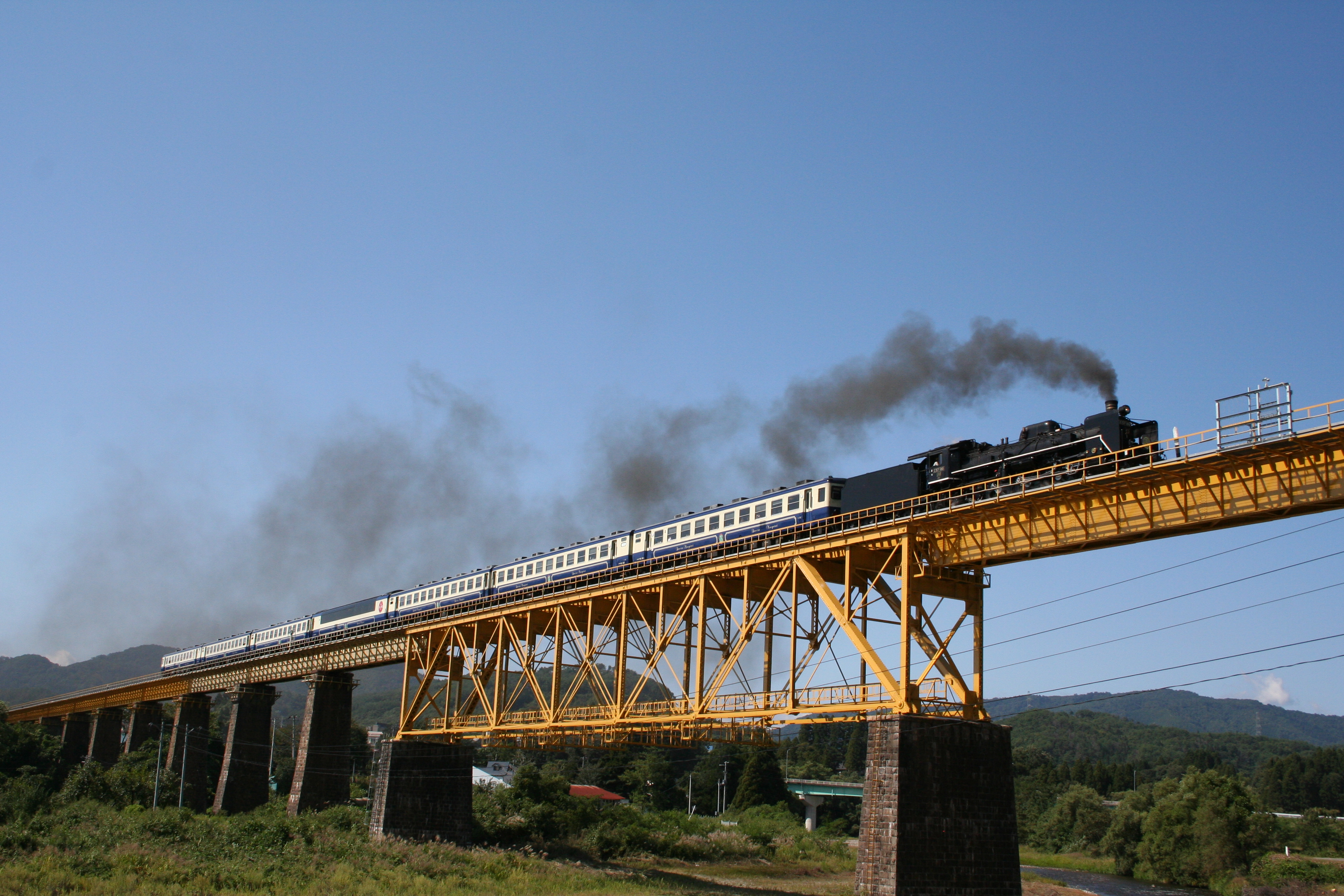
An SL Banetsu Monogatari service, hauled by C57 180, September 2009

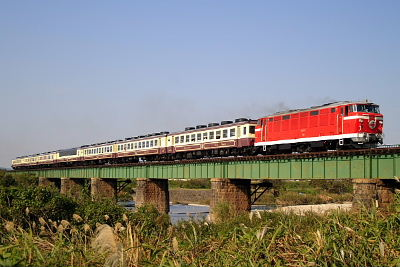
The Banetsu Monogatari trainset hauled by a DD53 diesel locomotive as a special DD53 Banetsu Monogatari service in November 2006

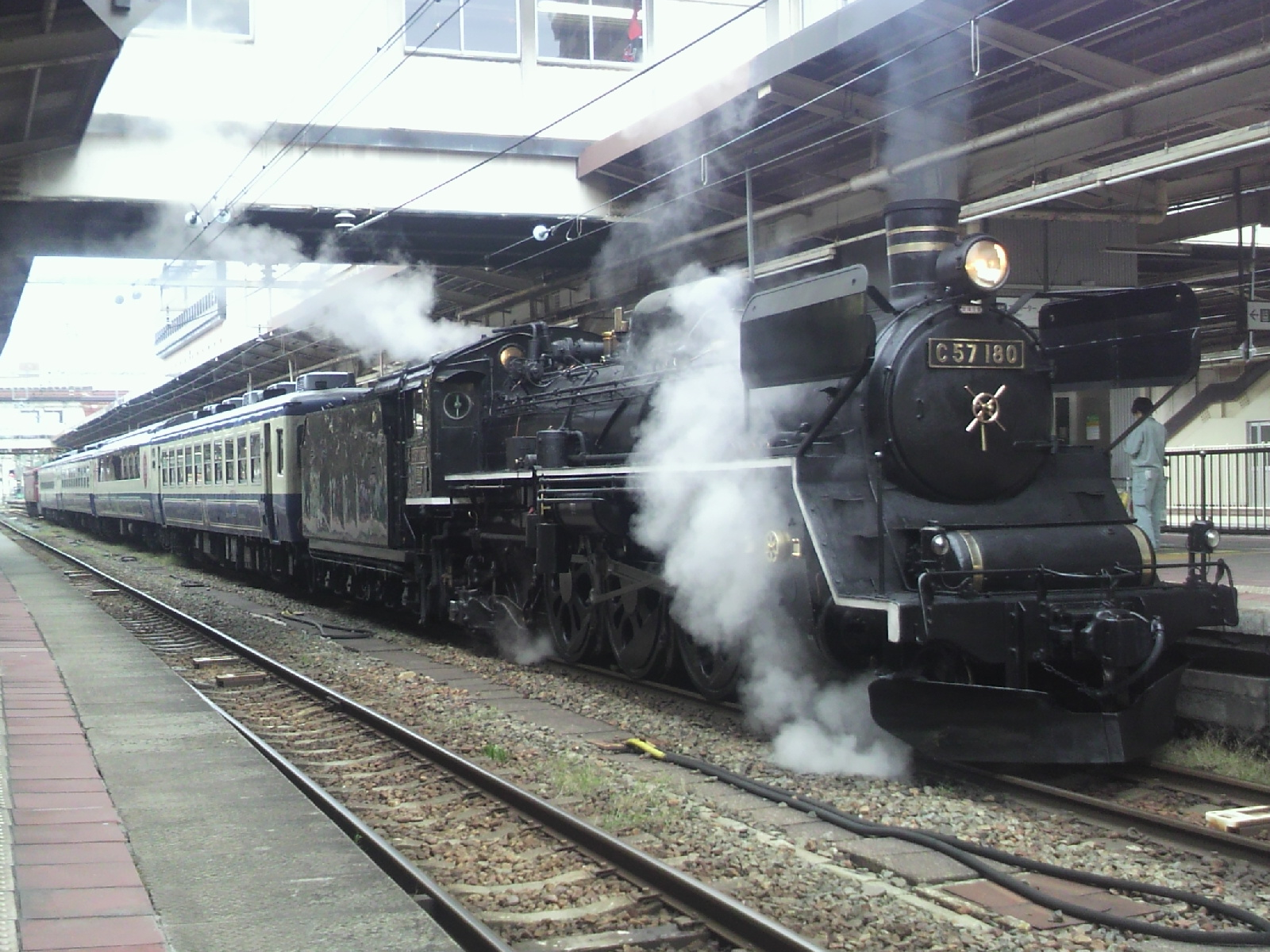
C57 180 at the head of a reduced-length 4-car SL Banetsu Monogatari service

== Formation ==
The dedicated trainset consists of seven 12 series passenger coaches converted from regular day coaches. Car number SuRoFu 12 102 is a Green (first class) observation car converted in 2013 from the former SuHaFu 12 102 standard-class seating car. It has 2+1 unidirectional seating and an observation space at the end of the car, and is finished in a new maroon and black livery.

Car No.	1	2	3	4	5	6	7
Numbering	SuHaFu 12 101	OHa 12 313	OHa 12 314	OHa 12 1701	OHa 12 316	OHa 12 315	SuRoFu 12 102
Facilities	Observation car, children's play area, WC	WC	WC	Lounge	Sales counter, WC	WC	Green observation car, WC

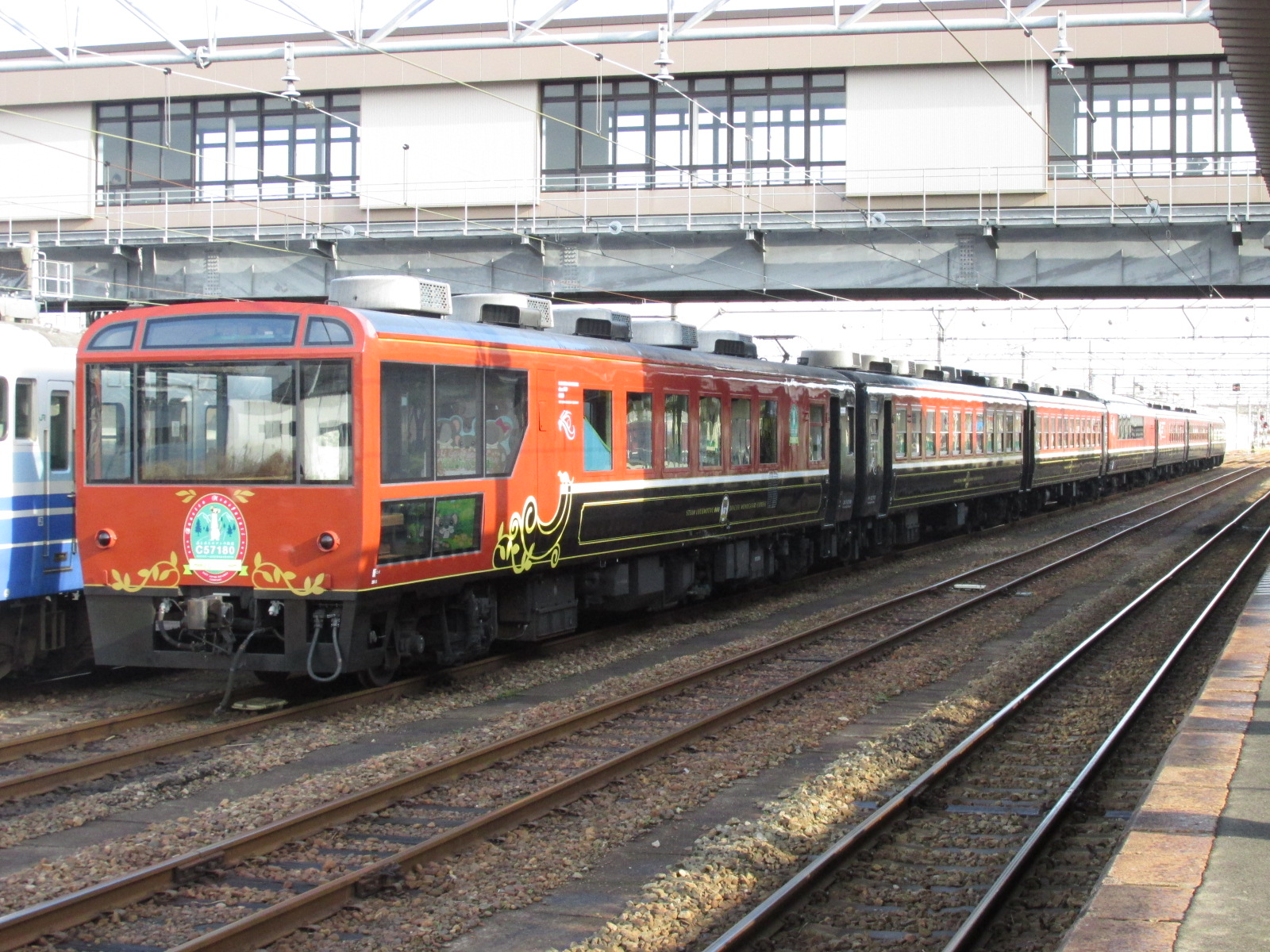
The Banetsu Monogatari trainset with SuHaFu 12 101 (car 1) observation car and children's saloon nearest the camera, April 2014

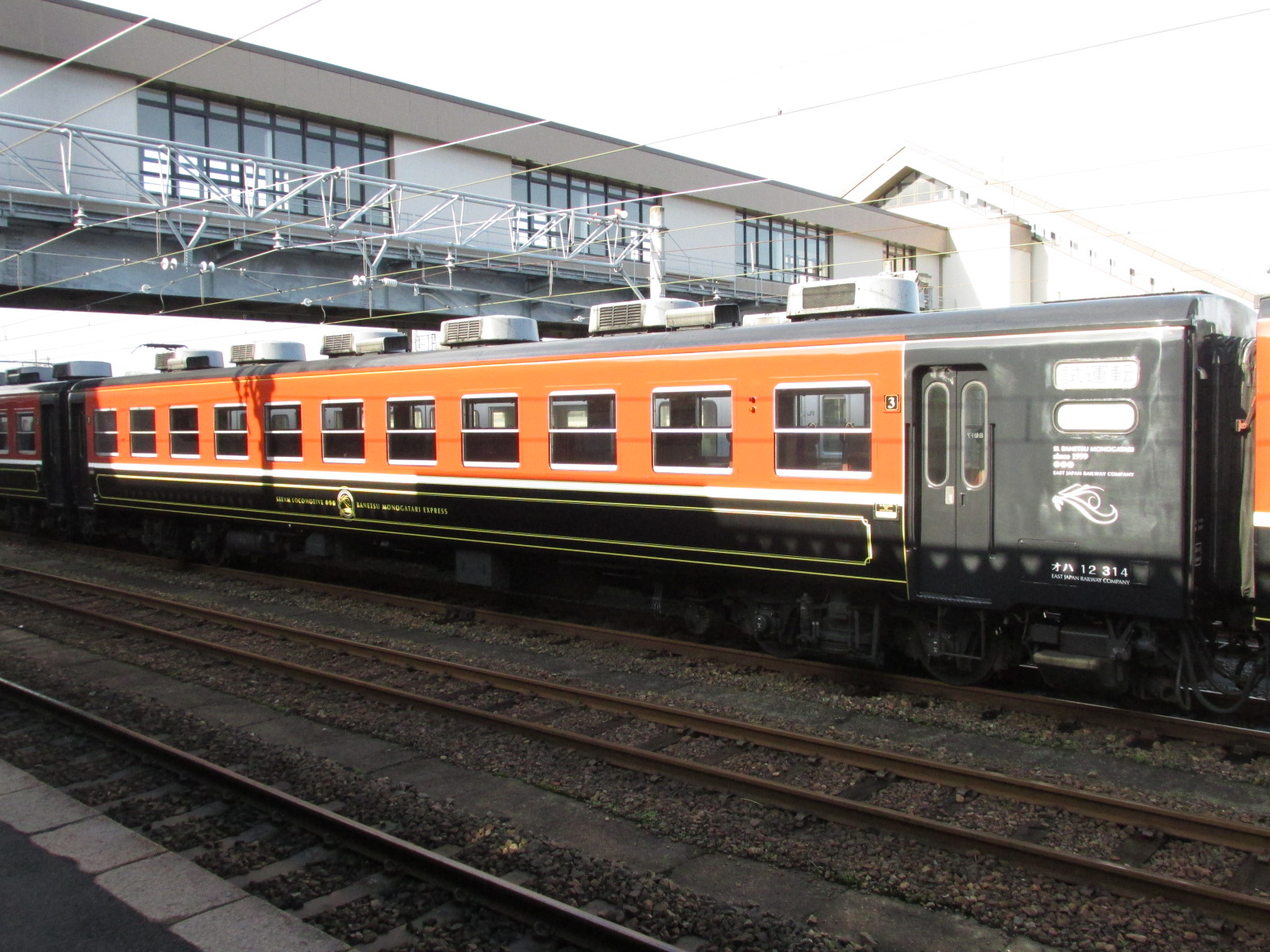
OHa 12 314 (car 3), April 2014

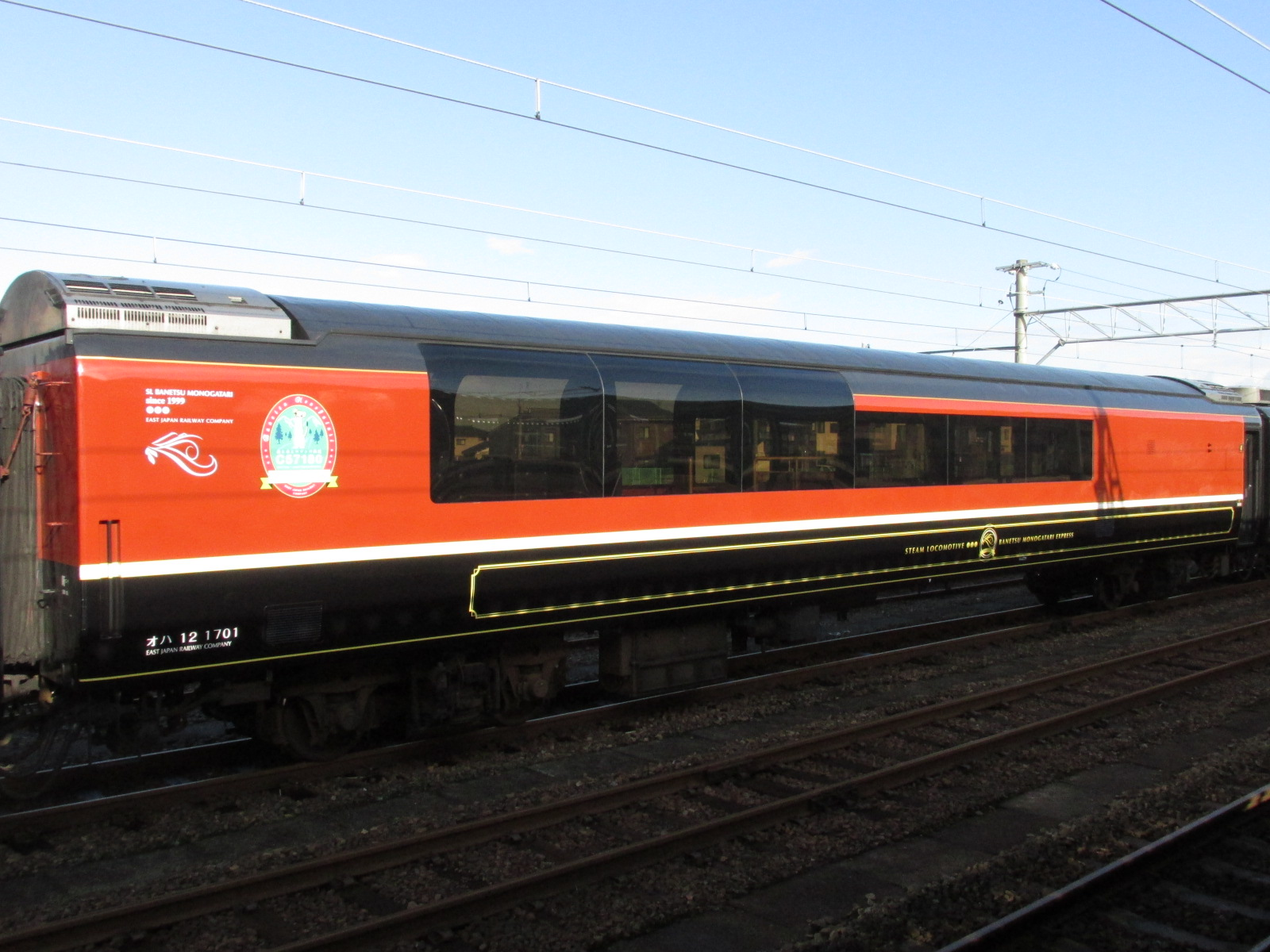
OHa 12 1701 (car 4), April 2014

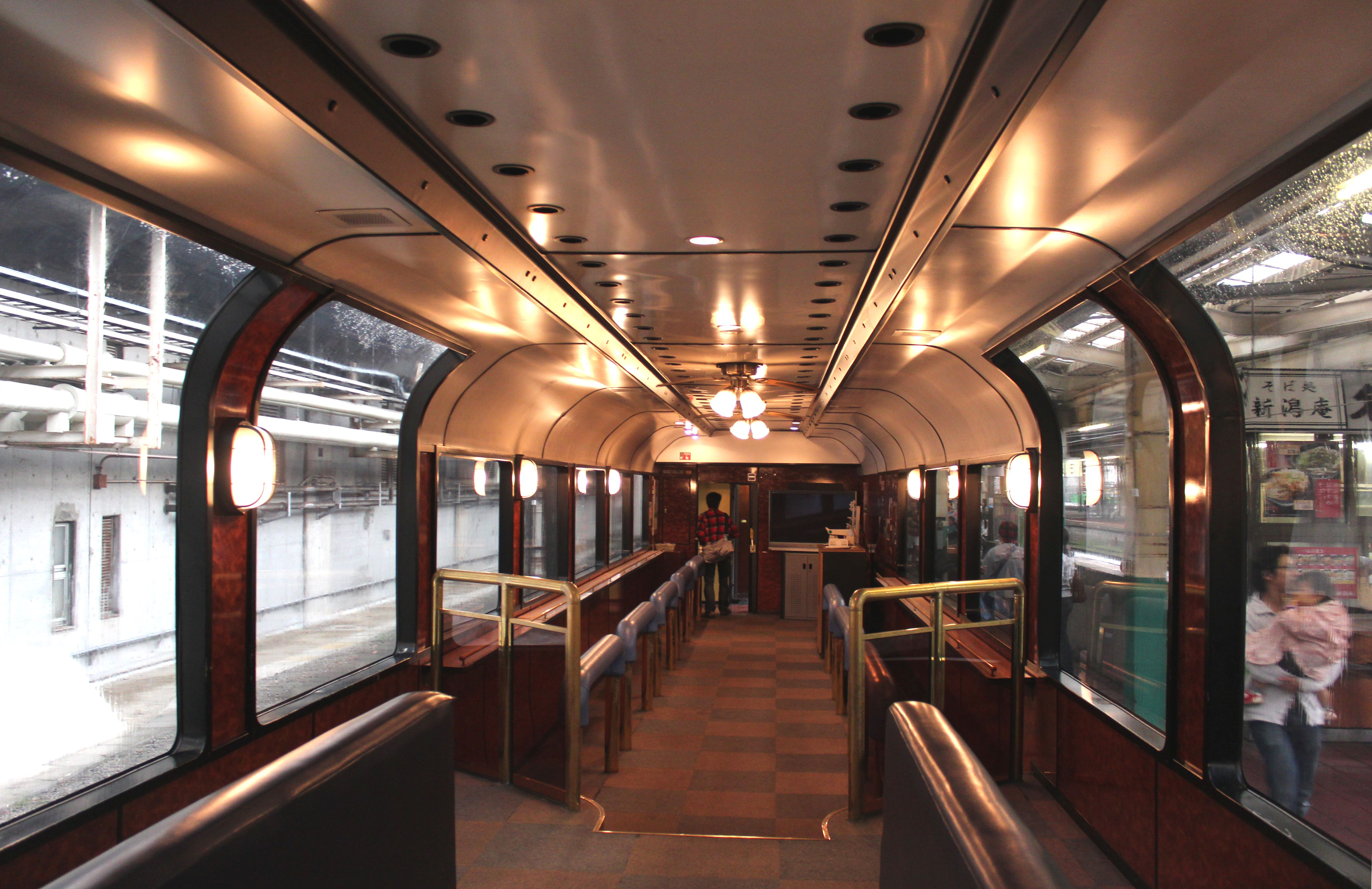
Interior of lounge car OHa 12 1701, October 2012

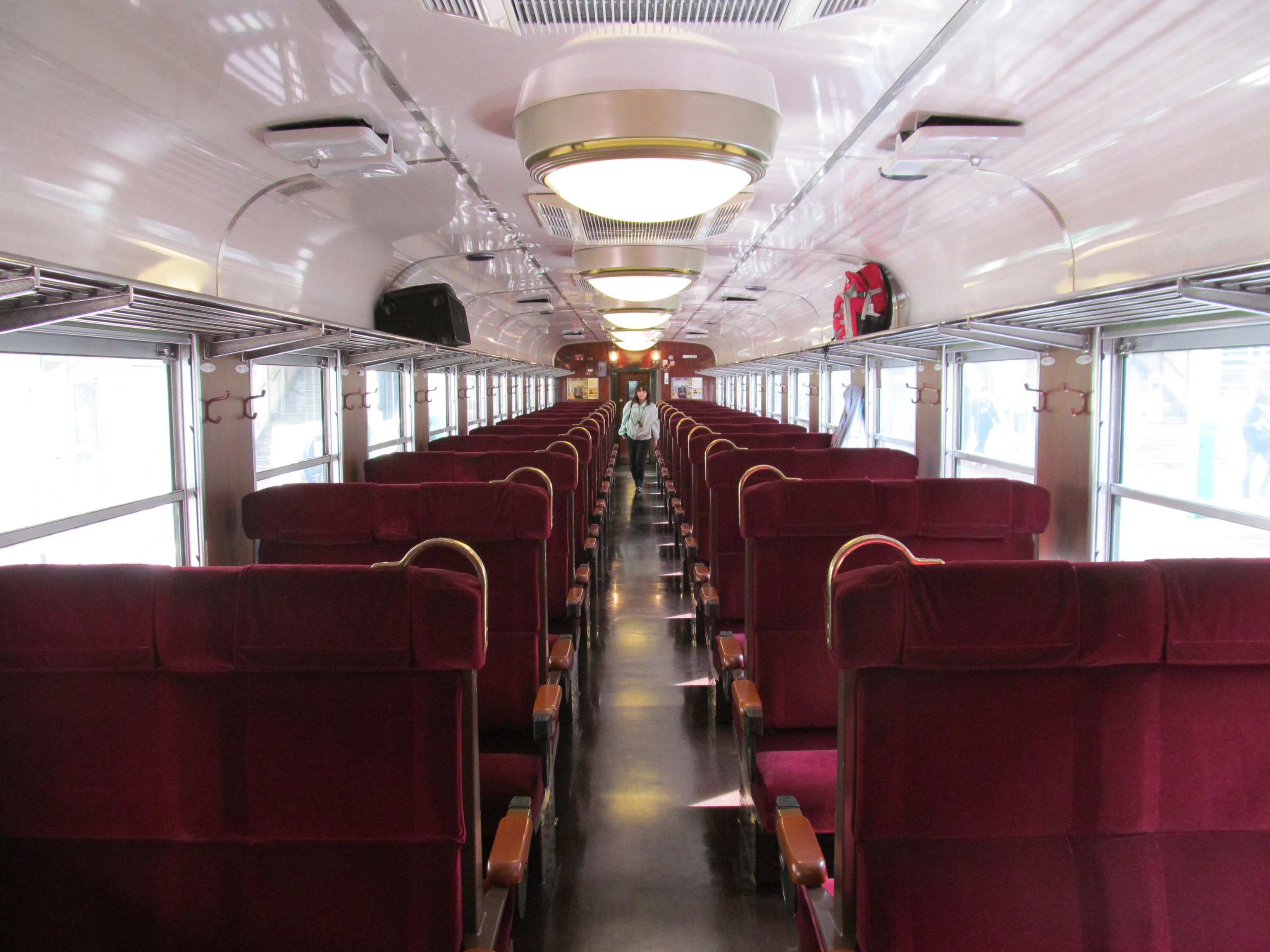
Interior of OHa 12 313, April 2013

SuRoFu 12 102
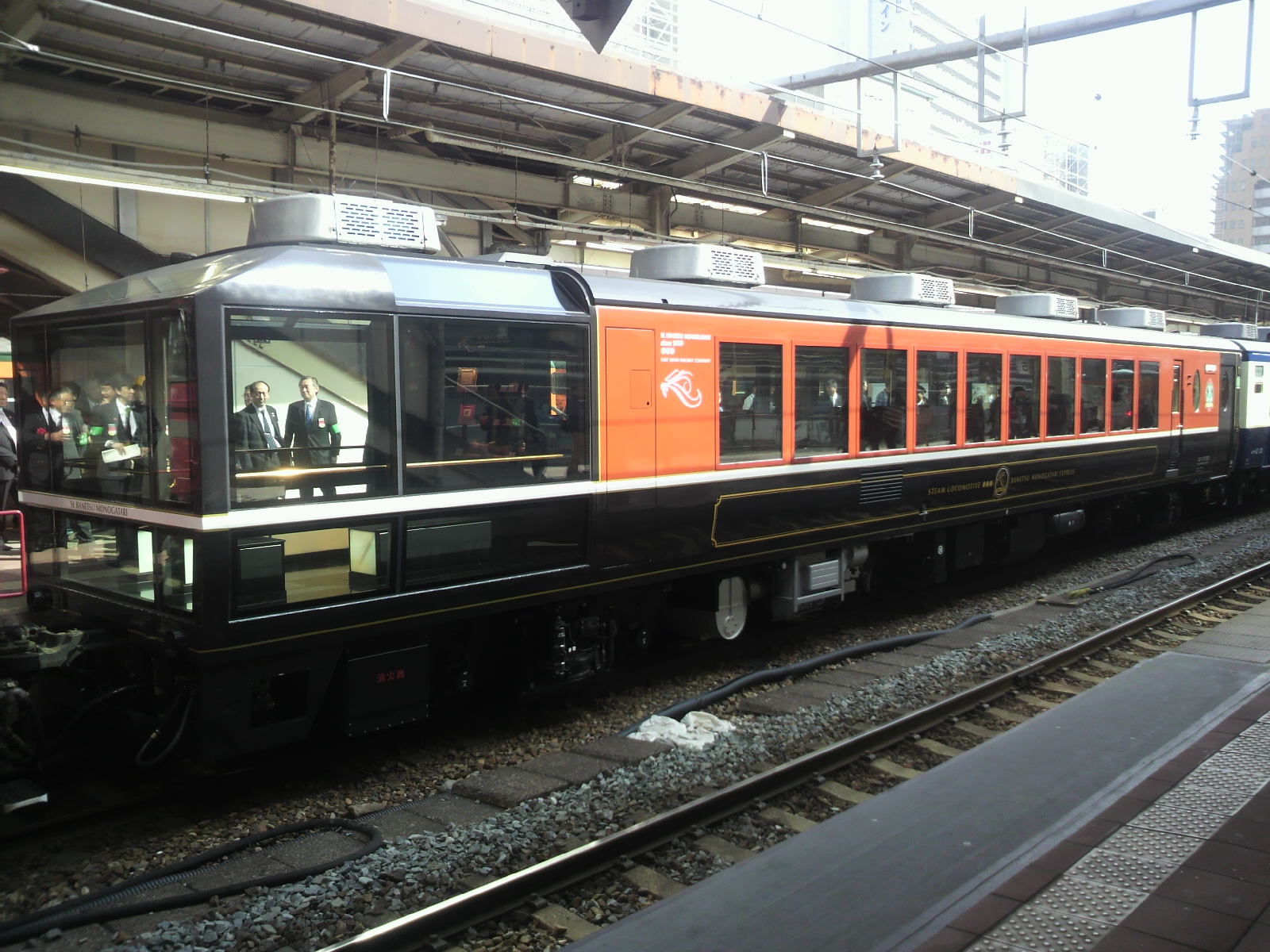
- SuRoFu 12 102, April 2013
- In service: 1999–
- Refurbished: 2013
- Capacity: 30
- Operators: JR East

Specifications
- Car body construction: Steel
- Car length: 21,300 mm (69 ft 11 in)
- Width: 2,900 mm (9 ft 6 in)
- Height: 4,079 mm (13 ft 4.6 in)
- Weight: 36.6 t
- Power supply: DM82 generator
- Bogies: TR217D
- Braking system(s): Air brakes, hand brake
- Track gauge: 1,067 mm (3 ft 6 in)

=== SuRoFu 12 102 ===
The "Green" (first class) observation car SuRoFu 12 102 was rebuilt in 2013 from the original standard class car SuHaFu 12 102. The car was rebuilt with new 2+1 reclining seating with a seating pitch of 1,150 mm (45 in), and observation area at the end of the car, and finished in a new livery of black and sienna. The train end of the car includes a conductor's office and general-purpose room.

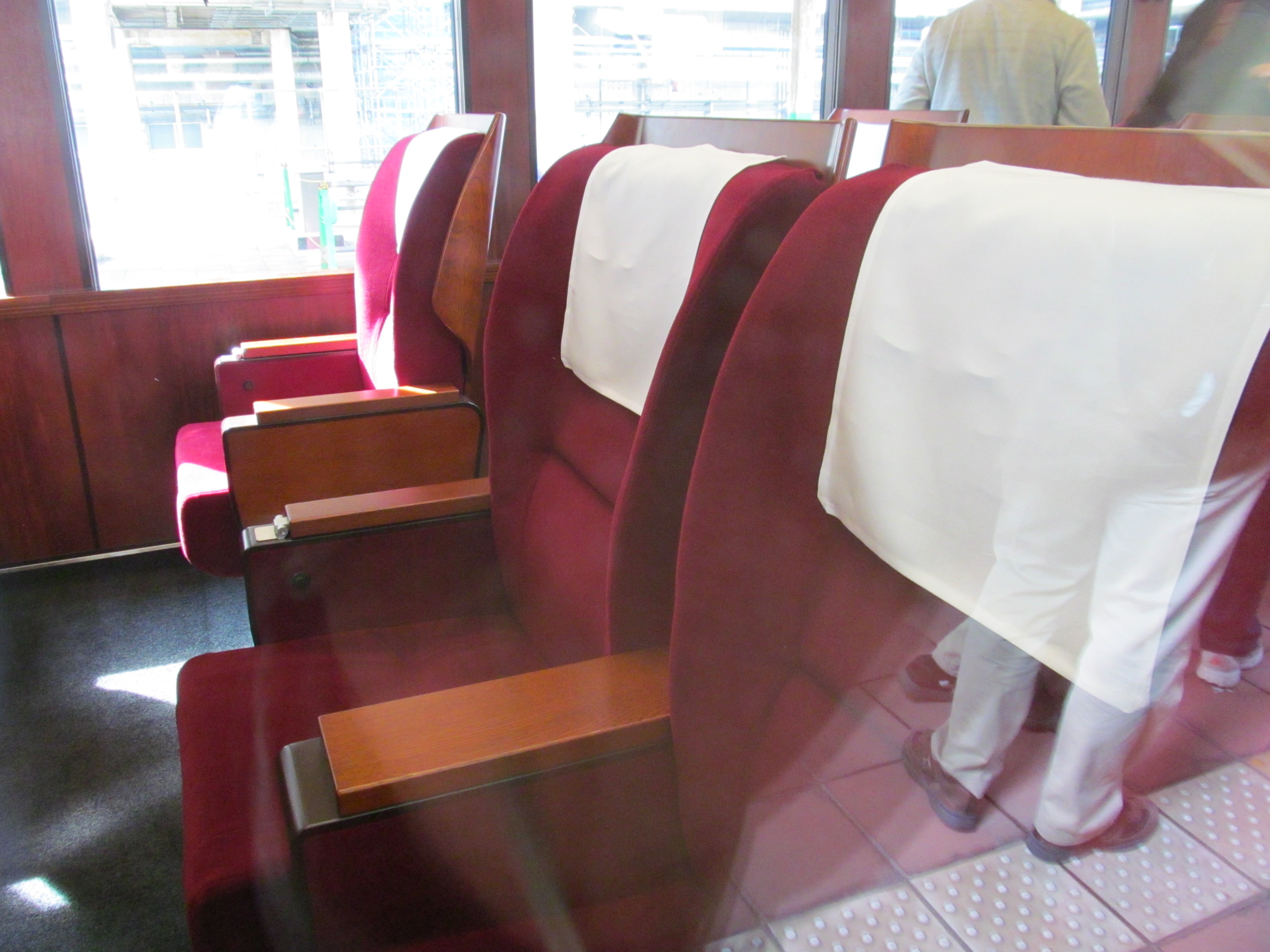
Green class seating inside SuRoFu 12 102, April 2013

== History ==
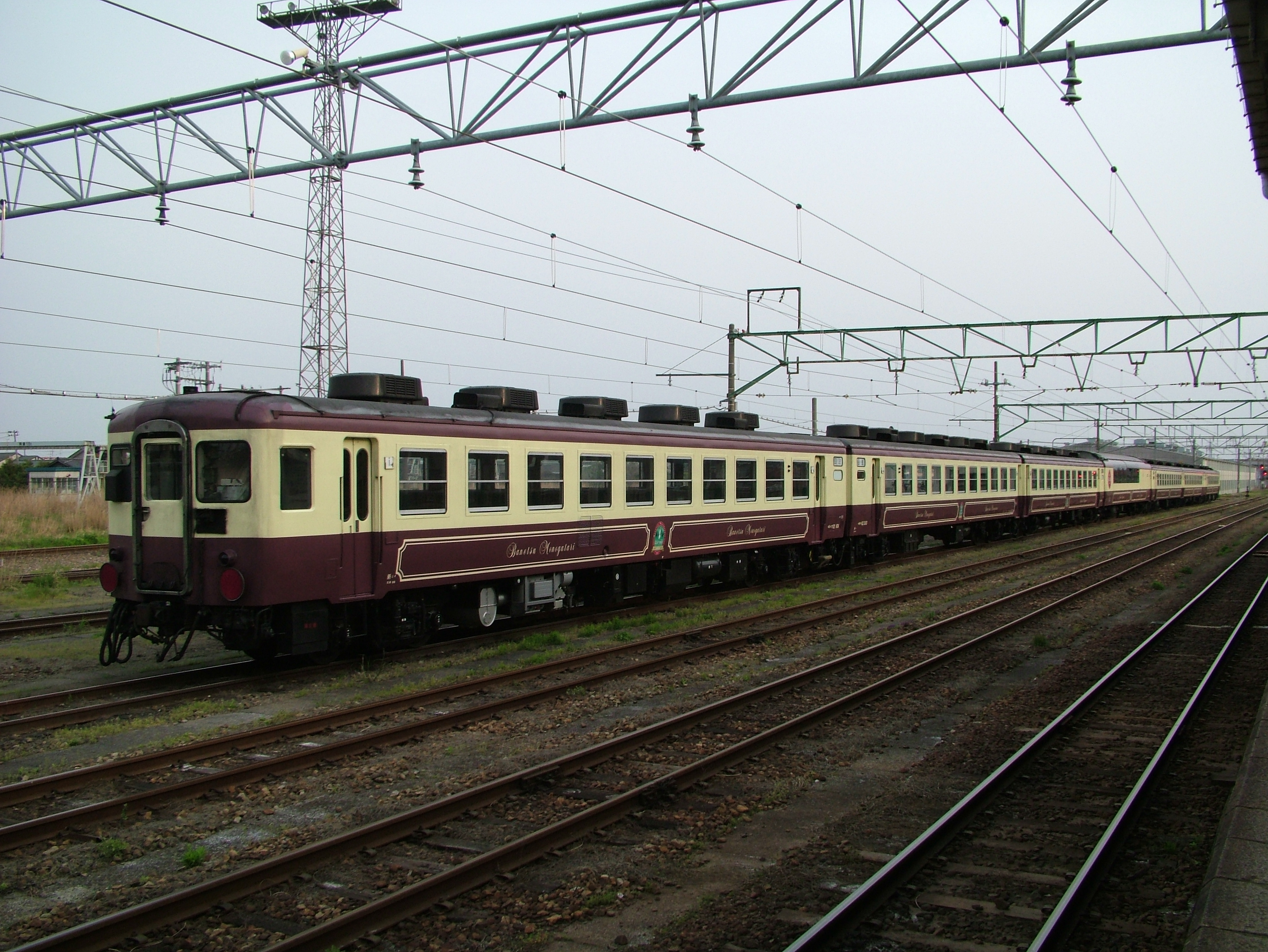
The Banetsu Monogatari trainset in its original livery, April 2005

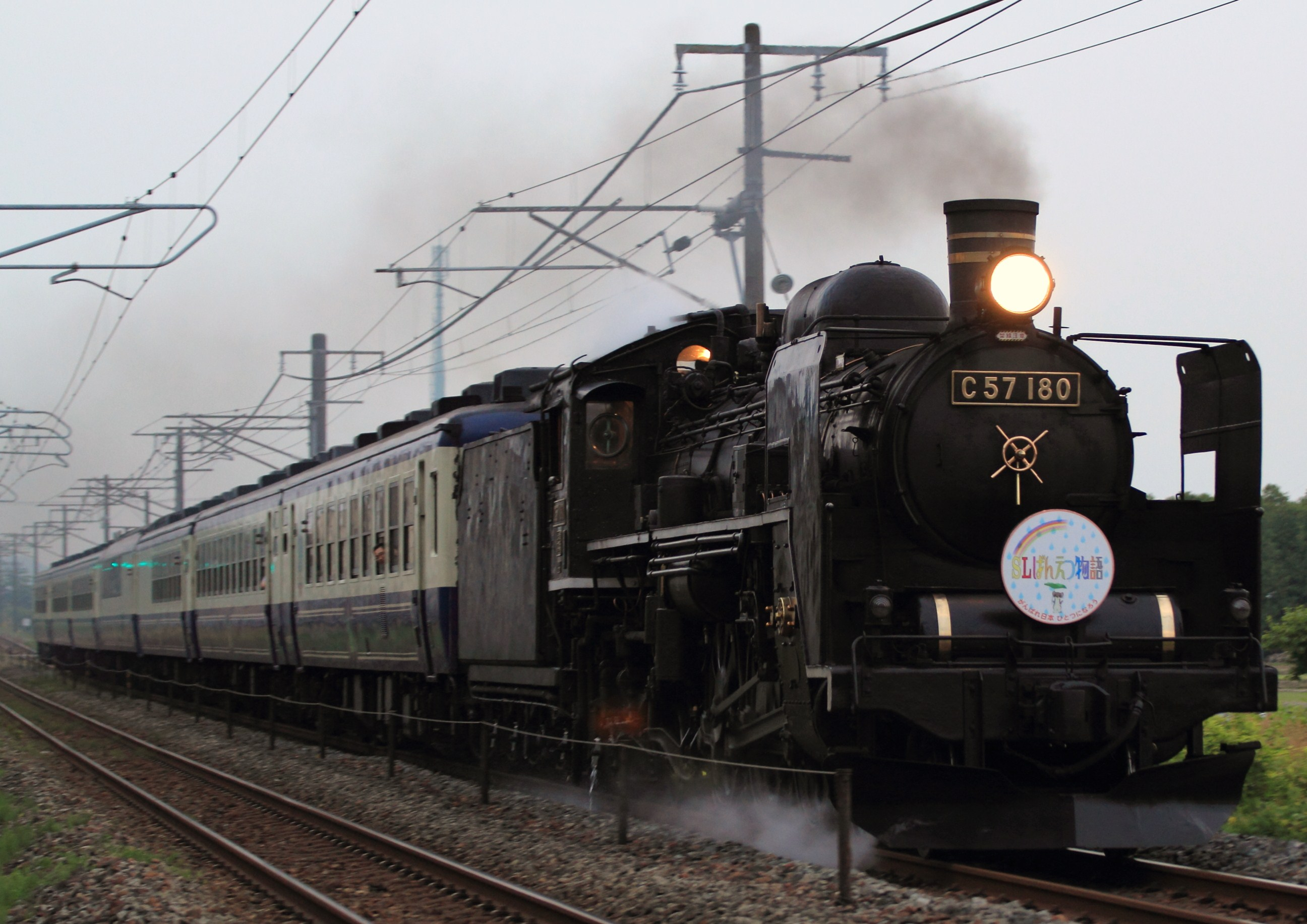
The Banetsu Monogatari trainset in blue and cream livery, June 2012

The Banetsu Monogatari trainset entered service on 29 April 1999, originally painted in a livery of chocolate and cream.

In late 2000, a lounge car with observation windows, OHa 12 1701, converted from SuHaFu 12 160, was inserted into the train, extending it to seven cars.

In 2007, the set was refurbished and repainted in a new blue and cream livery intended to evoke the colour scheme of the Orient Express. A sales counter was also added in car OHa 12 315 at the same time.

From 6 April 2013, SL Banetsu Monogatari services resumed with a new Green (first class) observation car, SuRoFu 12 102, as car 7, modified from the former SuHaFu 12 102.

In 2014, the SL Banetsu Monogatari train set was refurbished, with all cars repainted in the same black and sienna livery as the "Green" car SuRoFu 12 102. Car 1 was rebuilt with observation end windows, and the main saloon area became a children's play area called the "Stoat Room" (オコジョルーム, Okojo Rūmu). The rebuilt train returned to service from 5 April 2014.

== See also ==
- List of named passenger trains of Japan
- List of operational steam locomotives in Japan
