= Higashikanbara District, Niigata =

District in Niigata prefecture, Japan

Coordinates: 37.664923°N 139.464178°E

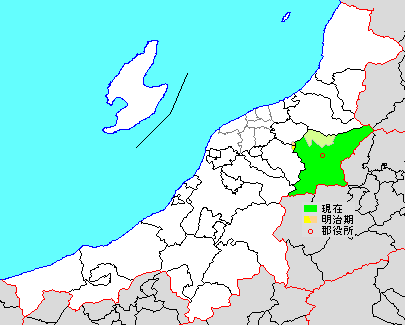
Map showing original extent of Higashikanbara District in Niigata Prefecture: * yellow - areas formerly within the district borders during the early Meiji period * green - current borders: 1. Aga-machi

Higashikanbara (東蒲原郡, Higashikanbara-gun) is a district located in Niigata, Japan.

As of July 1, 2019, the district has an estimated population of 10,327 with a density of 10.8 persons per km^{2}. The total area is 952.89 km^{2}.

== Municipalities ==
The district consists of only one town:

- Aga (Note: Classified as a town.)

== History ==
- The district was once belonged to Aizu clan and later became part of Wakamatsu Prefecture then to Fukushima Prefecture until 1889 when the district was transferred to Niigata Prefecture.

=== Recent mergers ===
- On April 1, 2005 - The towns of Kanose and Tsugawa, and the villages of Kamikawa and Mikawa were merged to form the town of Aga.
