= Agano River =

River in Hokuriku, Japan

Agano River 阿賀野川
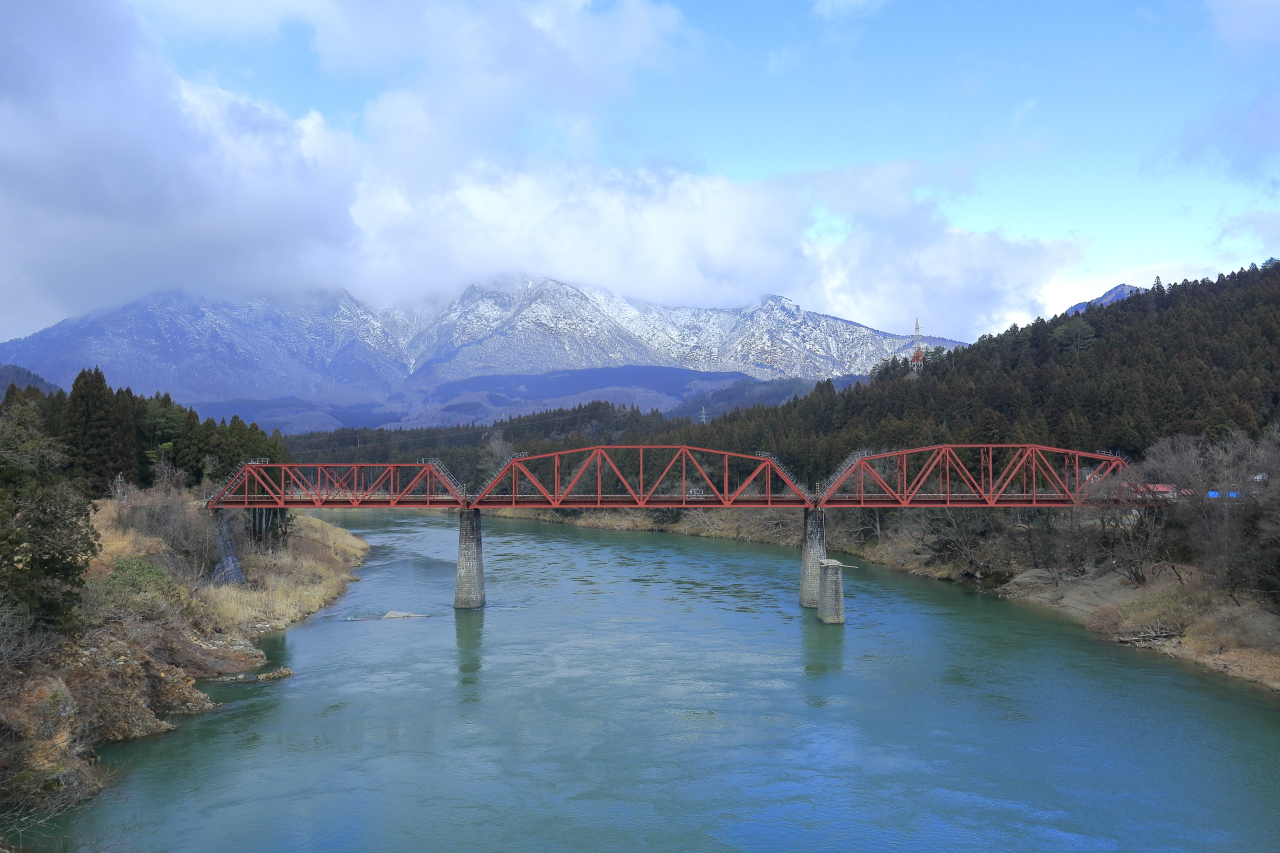
- Agano River and Taima Bridge of Ban'etsu West Line

- Location within Japan
- Native name: 阿賀野川 (Japanese)

Location
- Country: Japan
- Prefectures: Niigata, Fukushima, Gunma

Physical characteristics
- Source
  - location: Mount Arakai, border of Fukushima Prefecture and Tochigi Prefecture
  - elevation: 1,581 m (5,187 ft)
- Mouth
  - location: Sea of Japan, Niigata Prefecture
  - coordinates: 37°57′48″N 139°07′46″E
  - elevation: 0 m (0 ft)
- Length: 210 km (130 mi)
- Basin size: 7,710 km^{2} (2,980 sq mi)
- Discharge
  - average: 451 m^{3}/s (15,900 cu ft/s)

Basin features
- Population: 560,000

The Agano River (阿賀野川, Agano-gawa) is a river system in the Hokuriku region of Honshu, Japan. It is also called the Aga River or the Ōkawa River in Fukushima. It is designated as a Class A river.

The source of the river is Mount Arakai on the border of Fukushima and Tochigi prefectures. It flows to the north and meets the Nippashi River from Lake Inawashiro and the Tadami River in the Aizu Basin, and then turns to the west and empties into the Sea of Japan. The Agano River flows for 210 kilometers (130 mi). It has a watershed area of 7,710 square kilometers (2,980 sq mi). Approximately 560,000 people live in the basin area.

In 1964–1965, a chemical factory at Kanose village in Niigata Prefecture released methylmercury into the river and caused Niigata Minamata disease.

Agano is connected to the adjacent Shinano River by the 10.8 km (6.7 mi) long Koagano channel.

There are several hydroelectric power plants on the Agano River:

- Inawashiro Power Plant (107.5 MW), constructed in several stages in 1899–1940. It was the site of Japan's first high-voltage, long-range power transmission line.
- Numazawanuma Power Plant (43.7 MW), constructed in 1952. It was the first pumped-storage power plant in Japan.
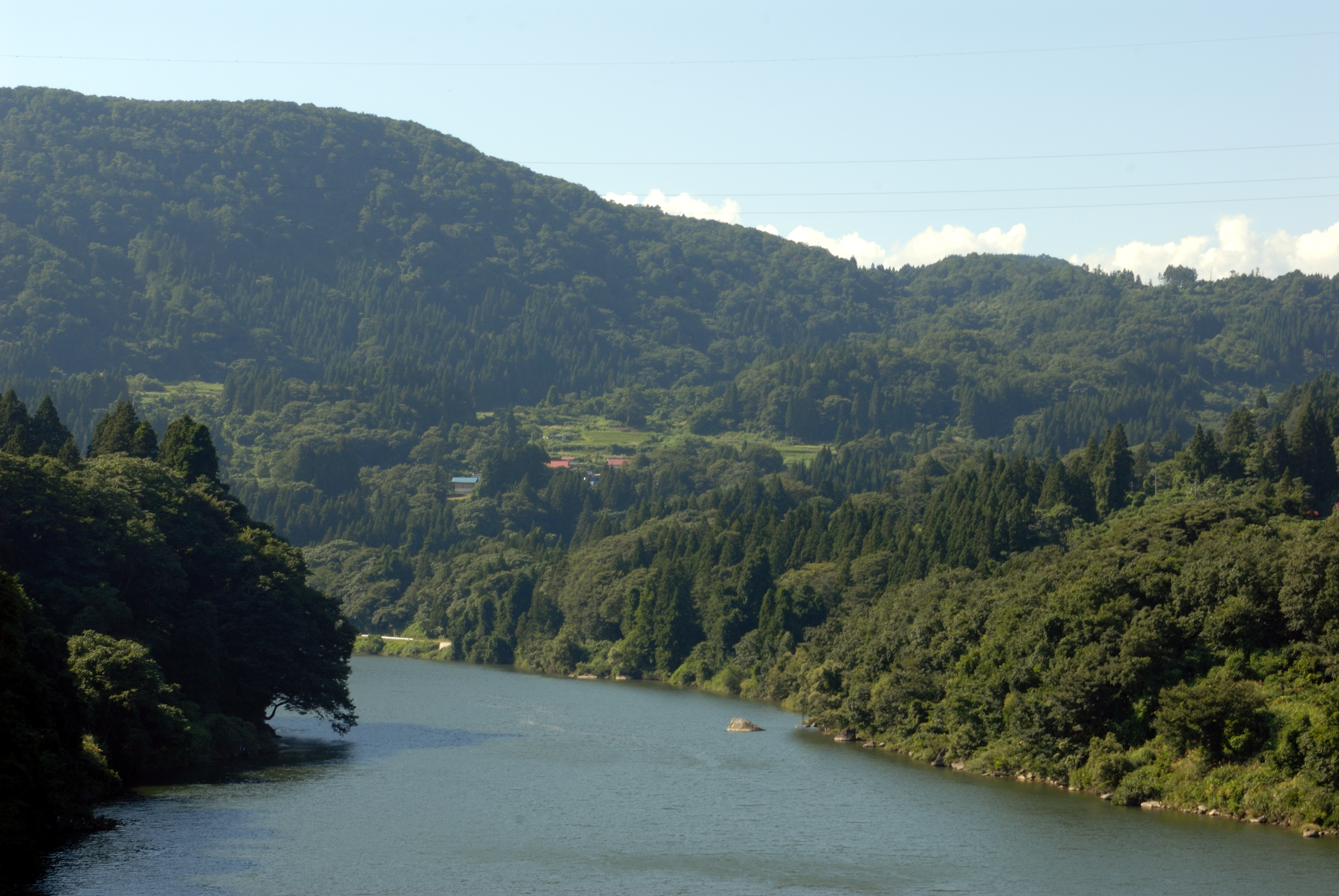
Agano River near Kitakata

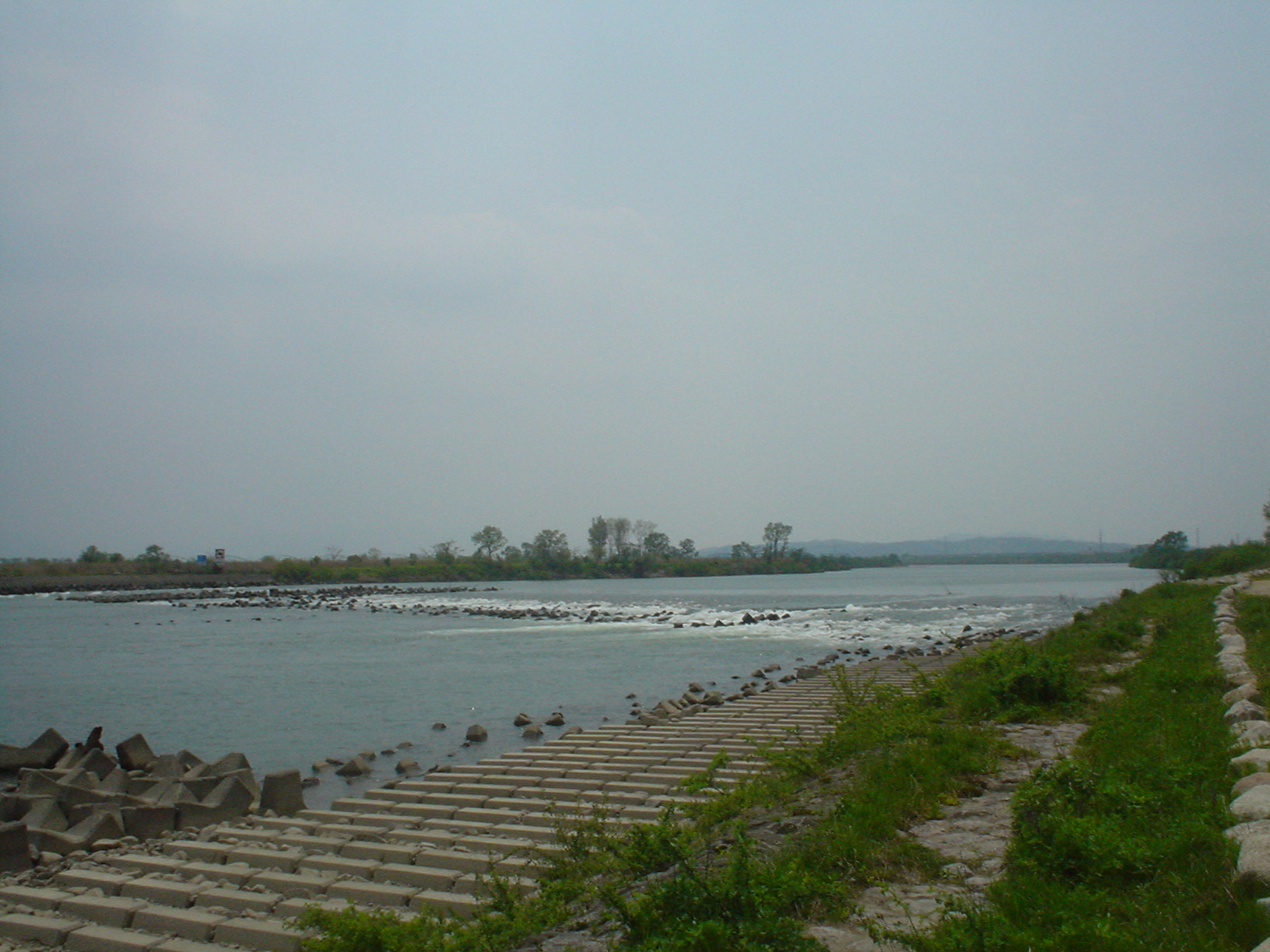
Agano River in Kōnan-ku, Niigata, 5/5/2007
